= List of windmills in Drenthe =

List of Dutch windmills

A comprehensive list of windmills in the Dutch province of Drenthe.

== A ==
Location	Name of mill and location	Type	Built	Notes	Photograph
Aalden	52°47′18″N 6°42′40″E	Standerdmolen	1652	Demolished 1835.	
Aalden	52°47′18″N 6°42′40″E	Beltmolen	1835	Burnt down 1890.	
Aalden	Jantina Hellingmolen; 52°47′18″N 6°42′40″E	Beltmolen	1891		
Aalden	Unnamed mill 52°47′30″N 6°43′24″E	Grondzeiler	Between 1640 and 1660	Demolished 1923.	
Aalden	Molen van Alden; 52°47′18″N 6°42′50″E	Standerdmolen	1652	Demolished 1835.	
Amen	Tjasker van Bos	Tjasker	Between 1910 and 1927		
Amen	Tjasker van het Boekwietenveentje; 52°55′54″N 6°35′02″E	Tjasker	Between 1910 and 1927		
Amen	Tjasker van het Horstveen	Tjasker	Between 1910 and 1927		
Anloo	Molen van Anloo; 53°02′38″N 6°42′56″E	Standerdmolen	c.1630	Burnt down 1833.	
Anloo	Molen van Anloo; 53°02′55″N 6°42′42″E	Grondzeiler	1834	Burnt down 1834.	
Anloo	Molen van Anloo; 53°02′55″N 6°42′42″E	Grondzeiler	1834	Burnt down 1869.	
Anloo	Molen van Anloo; 53°02′55″N 6°42′42″E	Grondzeiler	1869	Burnt down 1880.	
Anloo	Molen van Greving; 53°02′55″N 6°42′42″E	Grondzeiler	1881	Demolished 1923.	
Annen	Molen van Dekens; 53°03′49″N 6°45′12″E	Grondzeiler	1861	Moved within Annen in 1871.	
Annen	Molen van J. Dekens; 53°03′30″N 6°43′20″E	Stellingmolen	1871	Demolished c. 1919.	
Annen	Poldermolen Annerhoog; Zwetteakkers; 53°04′26″N 6°44′03″E	Grondzeiler		Demolished 1925.	
Annerveen	Molen op Polder 13; 53°04′44″N 6°45′43″E	Grondzeiler			
Annerveen	Molen op Polder 13; 53°04′44″N 6°45′43″E	Grondzeiler	1862	Demolished 1906.	
Annerveen	Molen op Polder 12; 53°05′13″N 6°46′28″E	Grondzeiler			
Annerveen	Waterschap; 53°04′57″N 6°45′18″E	Grondzeiler			
Annerveenschekanaal	Molen van B. Hubbeling	Stellingmolen	1857	Moved to Spijkerboor in 1867.	
Annerveenschekanaal	Molen van L. M. de Schukking; 53°05′06″N 6°47′20″E	Stellingmolen	1857	Moved to Wildervank, Groningen in 1898.	
Annerveenschekanaal	Molen van Polder 14	Grondzeiler			
Annerveenschekanaal	Molen van Polder 15	Grondzeiler			
Annerveenschekanaal	Molen van Polder 16	Grondzeiler			
Ansen	Molen van Ansen	Beltmolen	1889	Burnt down 1890.	
Ansen	Molen van Ansen	Beltmolen	1890	Demolished 1924.	
Assen	De Tulp; 52°59′41″N 6°32′10″E	Stellingmolen	1780	Moved to De Wilp, Groningen in 1901.	
Assen	Molen van Hindrick Busck; 52°59′41″N 6°32′10″E	Standerdmolen	1695	Burnt down 1808.	
Assen	Molen Smid; Molen Busch; 53°00′00″N 6°33′40″E	Stellingmolen	1808	Demolished 1935.	
Assen	Molen van Houtman; 52°59′47″N 6°31′59″E		1858	Burnt down 1865.	
Assen	Molen van Rademaker; 52°59′47″N 6°31′59″E	Stellingmolen	1866	Demolished 1914.	
Assen	Molen van Tidde Westerdijk; 52°59′55″N 6°34′46″E	Paltrokmolen	1862	Demolished 1873.	
Assen	Molen van Westerdijk en Sluuis; 53°00′03″N 6°34′45″E	Stellingmolen	1869	Moved to Eelde in 1910.	
Assen	Nooit Gedacht; Molen van Winters; Molen van Nienhuis; 52°59′42″N 6°32′37″E	Stellingmolen	1840	Demolished 1903.	
Assen	Oliemolen; 52°59′40″N 6°32′56″E	Stellingmolen			
Assen	Polder 1; 52°59′44″N 6°29′37″E	Weidemolen		Demolished c. 1874.	
Assen	Polder 2; 52°59′57″N 6°29′38″E	Weidemolen		Demolished before 1898.	
Assen	Polder 3; 52°59′53″N 6°30′16″E	Weidemolen		Demolished before 1898.	
Assen	Torenlaan; 52°59′36″N 6°33′44″E			Moved in 1676.	

== B ==
Location	Name of mill and location	Type	Built	Notes	Photograph
Balinge	52°48′42″N 6°37′29″E	Beltmolen	1874	Burnt down 1931.	
Barger-Compascuum	De Berk; 52°45′18″N 7°01′50″E	Stellingmolen	1983		
Barger-Compascum	Molen van Eilering; Molen van Wilken; Molen Fokkers; 52°59′57″N 6°29′38″E	Grondzeiler	1876	Demolished 1943.	
Barger-Oosterveen	52°41′22″N 6°58′28″E		1876	Demolished post-1949.<	
Beilen	De Volharding; 52°51′31″N 6°30′50″E	Stellingmolen	1775	Demolished 1955.	
Beilen	Molen van Beilen; 52°51′31″N 6°30′50″E	Standerdmolen	1634	Burnt down 1838.	
Beilen	Molen van Hartsuiker; 52°51′48″N 6°31′12″E	Stellingmolen	1838	Burnt down 1882.	
Beilen	Molen van het Convent; 52°51′31″N 6°30′50″E	Standerdmolen	Before 1429		
Beilen	Molen van Piet Smit; 52°51′48″N 6°31′12″E	Stellingmolen	1882	Demolished c. 1950.	
Beilen	De Volharding; 52°51′31″N 6°30′50″E	Stellingmolen	1775	Demolished 1955.	
Beilen	Polder de Hultinge; 52°51′52″N 6°30′07″E	Weidemmolen	1775	Demolished 1955; Molendatabase (in Dutch)	
Beilen	52°51′44″N 6°29′08″E		Between 1832 and 1850	Demolished post-1903.	
Beilen	Poldermolen aan het Oranjekanaal	Tjasker		Demolished post-1944.	
Beilen	Poldermolen aan het Oranjekanaal	Tjasker	Before 1944		
Beilen		Tjasker		Demolished post-1944.	
Beilen	Tjasker van Hunze; 52°53′51″N 6°30′38″E	Tjasker	Before 1915		
Beilen	52°51′15″N 6°31′12″E	Weidemolen	Post-1850		
Beilen	52°51′23″N 6°31′00″E	Weidemolen	Post-1850		
Bloemberg	De Bloemberg; 52°39′06″N 6°20′46″E	Stellingmolen	1854	Burnt down 1876.	
Bloemberg	Molen van Berendsen; 52°39′06″N 6°20′46″E	Stellingmolen	1876	Demolished 1927.	
Bonnen	Bonner Molen; 52°00′24″N 6°46′20″E	Stellingmolen	1908	Demolished 1987.	
Bonnerveen	Molen van Everts; 52°39′06″N 6°20′46″E	Stellingmolen	1841	Demolished 1946.	
Bonnerveen	Polder 19; 53°00′58″N 6°50′37″E	Weidemolen	Before 1886		
Bonnerveen	Polder 20; 53°00′48″N 6°52′02″E	Weidemolen	Before 1886		
Bonnerveen	Polder 21; 53°00′43″N 6°51′30″E	Weidemolen	Before 1886		
Borger	Molen van Prinsen; 52°57′13″N 6°47′40″E	Grondzeiler	Between 1790 and 1800	Moved in the 1820s.	
Borger	Molen van Snatering; Molen van Graver; 52°55′25″N 6°47′44″E	Stellingmolen	1847	Demolished 1930.	
Borger	52°55′31″N 6°47′32″E	Stellingmolen	1820s	Burnt down 1849.	
Borger	Scholten's Meule; 52°55′31″N 6°47′32″E	Stellingmolen	1849	Demolished 1890.	
Bovensmilde	Molen van Bovensmilde; 52°58′36″N 6°28′41″E	Stellingmolen	1835	Burnt down 1897.	
Bovensmilde	Molen van Bovensmilde; 52°58′40″N 6°28′39″E	Stellingmolen	1898	Demolished 1930.	
Bovensmilde	4th Blok; 52°59′19″N 6°25′31″E	Weidemolen		Demolished c. 1867.	
Bovensmilde	4th Blok; 52°59′18″N 6°26′31″E	Weidemolen		Demolished c. 1867.	
Bovensmilde	4th Blok; 52°59′14″N 6°25′35″E	Weidemolen		Demolished c. 1867.	
Bovensmilde	4th Blok; 52°59′15″N 6°26′38″E	Weidemolen		Demolished c. 1867.	
Bovensmilde	4th Blok; 52°59′08″N 6°26′41″E	Weidemolen	Before 1852	Demolished post-1898.	
Bovensmilde	5th Blok; 52°59′00″N 6°27′54″E	Weidemolen	Before 1832	Demolished post-1867.	
Bovensmilde	5th Blok; 52°59′07″N 6°28′31″E	Weidemolen	Before 1864	Demolished post-1867.	
Bovensmilde	5th Blok; 52°59′38″N 6°27′20″E	Weidemolen	Before 1867	Demolished before 1898.	
Bovensmilde	5th Blok; 52°58′58″N 6°28′38″E	Weidemolen	Before 1832	Demolished post-1867.	
Bovensmilde	5th Blok; 52°59′11″N 6°28′37″E	Weidemolen	Before 1852	Demolished post-1864.	
Bovensmilde	5th Blok; 52°59′23″N 6°26′47″E	Weidemolen	Before 1867	Demolished before 1898.<	
Bovensmilde	5th Blok; 52°59′22″N 6°26′56″E	Weidemolen		Demolished c. 1867.	
Bovensmilde	6th Blok; 52°59′19″N 6°29′07″E	Weidemolen	Before 1852	Demolished post-1867.	
Bovensmilde	6th Blok; 52°59′28″N 6°29′15″E	Weidemolen	Before 1852	Demolished post-1867.	
Bovensmilde	7th Blok; 52°59′39″N 6°29′30″E	Weidemolen	Before 1832	Demolished post-1867.	
Bovensmilde	52°59′21″N 6°28′41″E		Before 1832	Demolished post-1867.	
Buinen	Molen van Westerling; 52°55′49″N 6°50′08″E	Standerdmolen	1869	Demolished before 1873.	
Buinen	Molen van Westerling; 52°55′49″N 6°50′08″E	Grondzeiler	1873	Burnt down 1897.	
Buinen	Molen van Homan; Molen van Bos; 52°55′49″N 6°50′08″E	Grondzeiler	1897	Demolished 1951.	
Buinen	Polder 1; 52°55′33″N 6°51′38″E	Weidemolen			
Buinen	Polder 2; 52°55′27″N 6°51′32″E	Weidemolen			

== C ==
Location	Name of mill and location	Type	Built	Notes	Photograph
Coevorden	De Arend; 52°39′34″N 6°43′28″E		1888	Burnt down 1894.	
Coevorden	De Arend; 52°39′34″N 6°43′28″E	Stellingmolen	1894		
Coevorden	De Hoop; 52°39′03″N 6°42′23″E	Beltmolen	1864	Burnt down 1865.	
Coevorden	Molen van Plas; De Hoop; 52°39′03″N 6°42′23″E	Beltmolen	1865	Demolished 1939.	
Coevorden	52°40′11″N 6°44′15″E			Burnt down 1545. [ Molendatabase] (in Dutch)	
Coevorden	52°40′11″N 6°44′15″E		1778		
Coevorden	52°40′11″N 6°44′15″E		Between 1813 and 1821	Burnt down 1900.	
Coevorden	Molen van Scholten; 52°40′11″N 6°44′15″E	Stellingmolen	1900	Demolished 1907.	
Coevorden	Polder 17a 52°39′46″N 6°43′15″E	Tjasker			
Coevorden	52°39′31″N 6°44′50″E	Grondzeiler	1850	Demolished 1919.	
Coevorden	Kasteel Coevorden; 52°39′45″N 6°44′29″E	Standerdmolen	1609	Blown down 1649.	
Coevorden	Kasteel Coevorden; 52°39′45″N 6°44′29″E	Standerdmolen	1649	Demolished 1771.	
Coevorden	52°39′33″N 6°44′32″E	Standerdmolen	Before 1560	Demolished 1605.	
Coevorden	52°39′33″N 6°44′32″E	Standerdmolen	1609	Demolished 1649	

== D ==
Location	Name of mill and location	Type	Built	Notes	Photograph
Dalen	52°41′17″N 6°45′05″E	Standerdmolen		Burnt down 12 December 1813.	
Dalen	De Bente; 52°41′17″N 6°45′05″E	Stellingmolen	1814		
Dalen			1820	Demolished c1876.	
Dalen	Jan Pol; 52°42′03″N 6°45′16″E	Stellingmolen	1876		
Dalerend	Polder 10; 52°40′40″N 6°37′19″E	Weidemolen	Before 1885	Demolished before 1923.	
Dalerend	Polder 11; 52°40′30″N 6°37′21″E	Weidemolen	Before 1885	Demolished before 1923.	
Dalerend	Polder 12; 52°40′26″N 6°37′36″E	Weidemolen	Before 1885	Demolished before 1923.	
Dalerveen	Molen van Hendrik Strick; 52°40′30″N 6°37′21″E		1860	Burnt down 1885.	
Dalerveen	Molen van Kiers Oldenhuizing; 52°40′56″N 6°48′35″E	Stellingmolen	1886	Demolished 1922.	
De Groeve	52°06′23″N 6°42′16″E			Demolished 1870.	
De Groeve	De Boezemvriend, Molen van De Groeve; 52°06′23″N 6°42′16″E	Grondzeiler	1871		
De Groeve	53°06′58″N 6°43′06″E	Beltmolen	1836	Demolished 1923.	
De Groeve	Molen van Kuiper; 53°06′58″N 6°43′06″E	Grondzeiler	Before 1832	Moved to Windeweer, Groningen 1836.	
De Groeve	Polder 5; 53°06′49″N 6°43′20″E		Before 1887	Demolished before 1930.	
De Groeve	Polder 6; 53°06′42″N 6°43′07″E	Spinnenkopmolen	Before 1887		
De Groeve	Polder 7; 53°06′29″N 6°42′43″E				
De Groeve	Polder Zuidlaren; 53°06′24″N 6°42′16″E		Before 1832	Demolished 1871.	
De Groeve	Polder Zuidlaren-Hoogezand; 53°06′39″N 6°44′22″E	Grondzeiler	1868	Demolished 1916.	
De Wijk	De Wieker Meule; 52°40′20″N 6°17′13″E	Stellingmolen	1829		
Diever	52°51′06″N 6°18′49″E	Grondzeiler		Burnt down 1882.	
Diever	De Vlijt; 52°51′06″N 6°18′49″E	Stellingmolen	1882	(in Dutch)	
Diever	Blokmolen; Molen van Jan Kok; 53°51′26″N 6°19′18″E		1612	Burnt down 1884.	
Diever	Molen aan het Kasteel; 53°51′22″N 6°19′34″E	Standerdmolen	Before 1732	Demolished before 1753.	
Diever	Molen aan het Kasteel; 53°51′22″N 6°19′34″E	Stellingmolen	1753		
Diever	Oldendieverder Molen; Molen van Bennen; 53°51′08″N 6°19′29″E	Standerdmolen	Before 1616	Last known 1796.	
Diever	53°51′08″N 6°19′29″E	Standerdmolen	Before 1616		
Diever	Molen van Bennen; 53°51′08″N 6°19′29″E	Achtkantemolen	C. 1796	Moved to Veenhuizen 1832.	
Diever	Molen van Bennen; 53°51′08″N 6°19′29″E	Beltmolen		Moved to Staphorst, Overijssel 1915.	
Doldersum		Tjasker			
Donderen	53°05′58″N 6°32′52″E				
Donderen	Molen van Donderen; 53°05′54″N 6°32′52″E	Grondzeiler	1881	Demolished post-1926.	
Drouwen	Molen van Brinks; 52°57′06″N 6°48′21″E	Grondzeiler	1862	Burnt down 1870.	
Drouwen	Molen van Scholten; 52°57′06″N 6°48′21″E	Grondzeiler	1870	Burnt down 1895.	
Dwingeloo	52°49′53″N 6°22′20″E	Standerdmolen	1688	Demolished post-1840. [ Molendatabase] (in Dutch)	
Dwingeloo	Meule van Veeze; 52°49′53″N 6°22′20″E	Grondzeiler	Before 1850	Burnt down 1919.	
Dwingeloo	Molen van Greving; 52°49′59″N 6°21′30″E	Stellingmolen	1874	Demolished 1909, possibly moved.	
Dwingeloo	Polder 18; 52°50′13″N 6°20′23″E		1850		

== E ==
Location	Name of mill and location	Type	Built	Notes	Photograph
Echten		Grondzeiler	1866	Moved to Ruinen in 1964.	
Echten	Molen van Koelweide; 52°43′20″N 6°25′16″E		Between 1832 and 1850		
Echten	Molen van Echten; 52°42′23″N 6°23′59″E	Standerdmolen	Before 1629	Demolished c. 1789.	
Eelde	De Oude Molen; 53°07′32″N 6°34′29″E	Standerdmolen	Before 1606	Burnt down 1870.	
Eelde	53°07′32″N 6°34′29″E	Stellingmolen	1871	Burnt down 1894.	
Eelde	Hesselingspolder; 53°08′34″N 6°36′07″E	Between 1887 and 1903	1871	Demolished 1954.	
Eelde	Molen van Gerard Ritsema; 53°08′08″N 6°33′58″E		1898	Demolished 1910.	
Eelde	Molen van Bron Mulder; 53°08′08″N 6°33′58″E	Stellingmolen	1910	Moved to De Wilp, Groningen 1919, base demolished 1956.	
Eelde	Molen van K. Steunebrink; 53°07′32″N 6°34′29″E	Stellingmolen	1895	Burnt down 1919.	
Eelde	Molen van Westerling; 53°08′11″N 6°33′53″E	Grondzeiler	1848	Burnt down 1881.	
Eelde	Molen van Westerling; 53°08′11″N 6°33′53″E	Grondzeiler	1882	Burnt down 1896.	
Eelde	Polder 2; 53°08′45″N 6°35′05″E	Spinnenkopmolen	1892	Demolished before 1933.	
Eelde	Polder Het Wilde Veen; 53°08′11″N 6°33′53″E	Tjasker	Before 1853		
Eelde	Polder Nieuwediep; 53°08′06″N 6°36′28″E	Grondzeiler	1892	Blown down 1922.	
Eelde	Polder Spierveen; Kooistukken; Molen van Hartlief; 53°08′11″N 6°33′53″E	Spinnenkopmolen	1861	Demolished 1920.	
Eeldewolde	Molen van R. Nijdam; 53°10′41″N 6°33′03″E	Spinnenkopmolen	1845		
Eeldewolde	Polder 4; 53°10′39″N 6°32′21″E	Weidemolen	Before 1853		
Een	53°04′31″N 6°23′37″E	Spinnenkop stellingmolen	1899	Demolished 1910.	
Eerste Exloërmond	52°54′12″N 6°53′00″E	Standerdmolen	1860	Moved to Mussel 1869.	
Eexte	Molen van Eexte; 53°00′38″N 6°43′50″E	Standerdmolen		Burnt down 1833.	
Eexte	Molen van Eexte; 53°00′41″N 6°44′33″E		1834	Burnt down 1859.	
Eexte	Molen van Eexte; 53°00′41″N 6°44′33″E	Grondzeiler	1860	Demolished 1925.	
Eexte		Paaltjasker	Before 1925	Demolished post-1936.	
Ekehaar		Paaltjasker			
Eleveld	52°57′26″N 6°34′55″E	Standerdmolen	1630	Demolished c. 1796.	
Elp	52°52′56″N 6°38′21″E	Grondzeiler	1862	Demolished 1930.	
Emmen		Achtkantmolen		Moved to Zuidbarge in 1857.	
Emmen	Molen van Beins; 52°46′49″N 6°53′49″E	Stellingmolen	1856	Moved to Mortel, North Brabant 1913.	
Emmen	Molen van Beins; 52°46′49″N 6°53′49″E	Stellingmolen	1856	Burnt down 1897.	
Emmen	Molen van Huizing; 52°46′49″N 6°53′49″E	Stellingmolen	1897	Burnt down 1900.	
Emmen	Molen van Hovenkamp; 52°47′10″N 6°53′18″E	Stellingmolen	1867	Damaged by fire 1889, demolished 1890.	
Emmen	Molen van Kuipers; 52°46′53″N 6°53′57″E	Stellingmolen	1830	Moved to Roswinkel 1831.	
Emmen	Molen van ten Brink; De Huisvrouw; 52°47′10″N 6°53′18″E	Stellingmolen	1891	Burnt down 1919, base demolished 1967.	
Emmen	Saalhof Molen; 52°46′48″N 6°53′53″E	Standerdmolen	Before 1630	Demolished 1856.	
Emmen	Vollersmolen; 52°47′26″N 6°54′07″E		1742	Demolished c. 1804.	
Emmer-Compascuum	Grenzicht, Molen van Geerdink; 52°49′16″N 7°03′40″E	Stellingmolen	1907		
Erica	52°43′32″N 6°55′35″E	Grondzeiler	1877	Burnt down 1893.	
Erica	De Heidebloem; 52°43′32″N 6°55′35″E	Stellingmolen	1895		
Erm	52°45′03″N 6°48′45″E		Before 1806	Burnt down 1883.	
Erm	52°45′03″N 6°48′45″E	Stellingmolen	1883	Burnt down 1895.	
Erm	52°45′03″N 6°48′45″E	Stellingmolen	1895	Demolished 1947.	
Exloo	52°53′00″N 6°51′37″E	Standerdmolen	Before 1831	Demolished c. 1850.	
Exloo	52°53′00″N 6°51′37″E	Beltmolen	Before 1850	Demolished c. 1917.	
Exloo	52°54′06″N 6°52′54″E	Weidemolen	Before 1852	Demolished post-1864.	
Exloo	Polder 1; 52°54′06″N 6°52′54″E	Weidemolen	Before 1852	Demolished post-1864.	
Exloo	Polder 2; 52°53′53″N 6°53′16″E	Weidemolen	Before 1852	Demolished post-1864.	
Exloo	Polder 3; 52°53′50″N 6°53′07″E	Weidemolen	Before 1852	Demolished post-1864.	

== F ==
Location	Name of mill and location	Type	Built	Notes	Photograph
Frederiksoord	De Onderneming; Molen van Spikman; 52°50′25″N 6°11′13″E	Stellingmolen	1856	Burnt down 1947.	
Frederiksoord	52°50′50″N 6°11′31″E		Between 1645 and 1742	Demolished c. 1832.	
Frederiksoord	52°50′59″N 6°10′08″E		Before 1850	Demolished 1880.	
Frederiksoord	Molen van Spikman; 52°50′11″N 6°11′35″E	Weidemolen			

== G ==
Location	Name of mill and location	Type	Built	Notes	Photograph
Gasselte	Molen van Gasselte; 52°58′09″N 6°47′28″E	Standerdmolen	Before 1630	Burnt down 1851.	
Gasselte	Molen van Jan Hiddinge; 52°58′17″N 6°47′25″E	Stellingmolen	1851	Burnt down 1917.	
Gasselterboerveen	Polder 22; 53°00′20″N 6°52′08″E	Weidemolen	Before 1886		
Gasselterboerveen	Polder 23; 53°00′13″N 6°51′38″E	Weidemolen	Before 1886		
Gasselternijveen	Molen van J. Graver; 52°58′50″N 6°50′55″E	Stellingmolen	1841	Demolished 1969.	
Gasselternijveen	De Juffer; 52°59′8.57″N 6°50′13.51″E	Stellingmolen	1970		
Gasselternijveen	Polder 28; 52°59′21″N 6°52′35″E	Weidermolen	Before 1886		
Gasselternijveen	Polder 29; 52°59′17″N 6°52′19″E	Weidermolen	Before 1886		
Gasselternijveen	Polder 30; 52°59′20″N 6°52′16″E	Weidermolen	Before 1886		
Gasselternijveen	52°59′17″N 6°51′19″E		1856	Burnt down 1866.	
Gasselternijveen	52°59′17″N 6°51′19″E	Stellingmolen	1866	Moved to Bonnen 1908.	
Gasselternijveenschemond	52°59′59″N 6°55′27″E		1852	Burnt down 1885.	
Gasselternijveenschemond	Polder 24; 52°59′44″N 6°54′45″E	Weidemolen	Before 1886		
Gasselternijveenschemond	Polder 25; 52°59′41″N 6°54′29″E	Weidemolen	Before 1886		
Gasselternijveenschemond	Polder 26; 52°59′37″N 6°54′06″E	Weidemolen	Before 1886		
Gasselternijveenschemond	Polder 27; 52°59′33″N 6°53′47″E	Weidemolen	Before 1886		
Gees	Molen in de Zwindersche Es; 52°44′28″N 6°41′01″E	Grondzeiler		Burnt down c. 1924.	
Gees	Molen van Boesjes; 52°44′25″N 6°41′26″E	Grondzeiler	1858	Burnt down 1927.	
Gees	Molen van Pol; 52°44′45″N 6°41′48″E	Grondzeiler	1866	Demolished 1926.	
Gieten	Hazewind; 52°00′23″N 6°45′43″E	Stellingmolen	1833		
Gieterveen		Achtkantmolen	1877	Burnt down 1904.	
Gieterveen	De Eendracht; 52°01′39.57″N 6°50′32.99″E	Stellingmolen	1904		
Gieterveen	Molen van Mulder; 53°01′40″N 6°50′35″E	Stellingmolen	1877	Burnt down 1904.	
Gieterveen	Polder 18; 53°02′13″N 6°51′39″E	Weidemolen	Before 1877		
Gieterveen	53°01′40″N 6°50′28″E	Stellingmolen	Before 1900	Demolished post-1919.	
Grolloo	Tjasker Grolloo; 52°54′57″N 6°39′20″E	Paaltjasker	1986		
Grolloo	Molen van Bos; 52°56′10″N 6°40′04″E	Grondzeiler	1852	Demolished c. 1920.	
Grolloo	Van Dilling	Tjasker	Before 1930		

== H ==
Location	Name of mill and location	Type	Built	Notes	Photograph
Havelte	Havelte Molen; 52°46′31″N 6°13′48″E	Standermolen	Before 1691	Demolished c. 1770.	
Havelte	52°46′35″N 6°14′09″E	Stellingmolen	1873	Burnt down 1914.	
Havelte	Havelter Molen, Havelte; 52°46′35″N 6°14′09″E	Stellingmolen	1914		
Havelte	Molen van Carst van der Wetering; 52°46′35″N 6°14′09″E	Grondzeiler	Before 1832	Destroyed by fire 1913. [ Molendatabase]	
Havelte	Molen van Jan Barents; 52°46′34″N 6°13′36″E	Standerdmolen	Before 1766	Demolished 1873.	
Havixhorst	Havickhorster Meule; 52°41′22″N 6°14′45″E	Standerdmolen		Demolished 1650.	
Hijken	Molen van Hiken; 52°53′51″N 6°29′50″E	Standerdmolen	Between 1630 and 1645	Burnt down 1869.	
Hijken	Molen van Mensing; 52°53′57″N 6°30′08″E	Beltmolen	Between 1864 and 1896	Demolished 1927.	
Hijken	52°53′46″N 6°28′44″E	Tjasker	1896	Demolished post-1927.	
Hijkersmilde	Molentje van E. Daling	Tjasker		Demolished post-1944.	
Hollandscheveld	Molen Eshuis; 52°41′17″N 6°32′15″E	Stellingmolen	1866	Demolished 1952, base demolished 1961.	
Hollandscheveld	Molen van Zegeren; Molen van Harens; 52°42′23″N 6°32′08″E	Stellingmolen	1852	Burnt down 1940.	
Hollandscheveld	Polder 1; 52°41′54″N 6°28′46″E	Weidemolen	Before 1885		
Hollandscheveld	Polder 2; 52°41′53″N 6°29′37″E	Weidemolen	Before 1885		
Hollandscheveld	Polder 2a 52°41′57″N 6°30′55″E	Weidemolen	Before 1885		
Hollandscheveld	Polder 3; 52°41′38″N 6°28′58″E	Weidemolen	Before 1885		
Hollandscheveld	Polder 4; 52°41′09″N 6°30′39″E	Weidemolen	Before 1885		
Holthe	Molen van Willem Mulders		Before 1645		
Hoogersmilde	52°54′55″N 6°24′23″E		Before 1850	Burnt down 1863.	
Hoogersmilde	52°54′55″N 6°24′23″E		1864	Burnt down 1913.	
Hoogersmilde	Molen van J. Wichers; 52°55′11″N 6°24′35″E		Before 1850	Burnt down 1881.	
Hoogeveen	52°43′31″N 6°28′56″E		c.1714	Burnt down 1787.	
Hoogeveen	52°43′31″N 6°28′56″E	Stellingmolen	1787	Burnt down 1833.	
Hoogeveen	De Zwaluw; 52°43′31″N 6°28′56″E	Stellingmolen	1834		
Hoogeveen	De Adelaar; 52°43′45″N 6°28′39″E	Stellingmolen	1857-58	Demolished 1924.	
Hoogeveen	Molen op Schut; 52°43′10″N 6°28′10″E	Stellingmolen	1908	Demolished 1919.	
Hoogeveen	Korenmolen van Hogeveen; 52°43′10″N 6°28′10″E	Standerdmolen	1662	Burnt down 1673.	
Hoogeveen	Korenmolen van Hogeveen; 52°43′10″N 6°28′10″E	Stellingmolen	Before 1756	Burnt down 1906.	
Hoogeveen	Molen van de Coöperatieve Landbouwbank; 52°43′14″N 6°28′58″E	Stellingmolen	Between 1832 and 1850	Demolished 1927.	
Hoogeveen	Molen van de Heer van Echten; 52°42′24″N 6°24′24″E	Grondzeiler	1681	Moved to Ruinen 1962.	
Hoogeveen	52°44′11″N 6°28′20″E	Weidemolen		Demolished post-1867.	
Hoogeveen	52°43′42″N 6°28′54″E	Weidemolen		Demolished post-1867.	
Hoogeveen	52°44′11″N 6°28′20″E	Tjasker	Between 1641 and 1645		
Hoogeveen	Van Otten	Tjasker			
Hoogeveen	52°44′11″N 6°28′20″E	Weidemolen		Demolished post-1867.	
Hooghalen	Molen van Kuiper; 52°55′07″N 6°32′07″E	Beltmolen	Before 1900	Demolished 1915.	
Hooghalen		Tjasker			

== K ==
Location	Name of mill and location	Type	Built	Notes	Photograph
Klazienaveen	Molen van Borker; 52°43′25″N 7°00′09″E	Stellingmolen	1905	Burnt down 1941.	
Klazienaveen	Molen van Geertzen	Stellingmolen		Moved to Adorf, Lower Saxony, Germany in 1890.	
Koekange		Stellingmolen			
Koekange	52°42′29″N 6°18′06″E	Standerdmolen	Before 1832	Burnt down before 1886.	
Koekange	52°42′11″N 6°18′58″E	Stellingmolen	1792	Demolished 1938.	
Koekange	52°42′16″N 6°18′07″E	Grondzeiler	1850	Moved 1929.	
Koekange	De Wijk; 52°42′28″N 6°18′06″E	Beltmolen	1863	Demolished 1962.	
Koekange	De Wijk; 52°42′28″N 6°18′06″E	Beltmolen	1863	Demolished 1962.	
Kolderveen	Middelste Meule; 52°43′13″N 6°09′26″E	Standerdmolen	Before 1630	Demolished before 1700.	
Kolderveen	Ooster Meule; 52°43′22″N 6°09′47″E	Grondzeiler	1600	Burnt down 1852.	
Kolderveen	Polder 57; 52°44′45″N 6°07′39″E	Tjasker		Demolished post-1929.	
Kolderveen	Polder 58; 52°44′39″N 6°07′58″E	Weidemolen	Before 1883		
Kolderveen	Polder 58a 52°43′09″N 6°08′42″E	Weidemolen			
Kolderveen	Polder 59; 52°44′35″N 6°07′45″E	Weidemolen	Before 1883	6	
Kolderveen	Polder 60; 52°42′51″N 6°08′39″E	Weidemolen			
Kolderveen	Polder 60a 52°43′08″N 6°09′48″E	Weidemolen			
Kolderveen	Tjasker van M. Green	Tjasker			
Kolderveen	Polder 59; 52°44′35″N 6°07′45″E	Weidemolen	Before 1883		
Kraloo	Molen van Kraloo; 52°42′29″N 6°14′55″E				

== L ==
Location	Name of mill and location	Type	Built	Notes	Photograph
Leggeloo	Eemshornermeule; 52°51′30″N 6°22′07″E	Standerdmolen	Before 1645	Burnt down 1895.	
Leggeloo	Eemshornermeule; 52°51′30″N 6°22′07″E	Gronndzeiler	1896	Demolished post-1913.	
Leutingewolde	Poldermolen Leutingewolde; 53°10′31″N 6°25′25″E	Grondzeiler	1858	Demolished 1926.	
Lhee	Molen van Mijnheer Jelle				
Loon	53°00′38″N 6°36′47″E	Grondzeiler	1832	Demolished c. 1875.	
Loon	Molen van Westerling; 53°00′38″N 6°36′47″E	Stellingmolen	1875	Burnt down 1914, base demolished 1917.	

== M ==
Location	Name of mill and location	Type	Built	Notes	Photograph
Makkum	52°50′47″N 6°31′53″E	Standerdmolen		Blown down 1906.	
Makkum	Molen van Makkum; 52°50′47″N 6°31′53″E	Grondzeiler	1906		
Matsloot	Molentje van Sluis en Winter; 53°11′49″N 6°28′57″E	Spinnenkopmolen	Before 1862		
Meppel	De Weert, Eekmolen; De Reest; 52°41′36″N 6°11′10″E	Stellingmolen	1807	Demolished to base level in 1937.	
Meppel	De Weert; 52°41′36″N 6°11′10″E	Stellingmolen	1998		
Meppel	52°41′44″N 6°11′11″E	Standerdmolen	1753	Burnt down 1765.	
Meppel	52°41′44″N 6°11′11″E	Standerdmolen	1766	Burnt down before 1830.	
Meppel	52°41′44″N 6°11′11″E	Stellingmolen	1830	Burnt down 1858.	
Meppel	De Vlijt; 52°41′44″N 6°11′10″E	Stellingmolen	1858	Demolished 1965.	
Meppel	De Vlijt; 52°41′44″N 6°11′10″E	Stellingmolen	2001		
Meppel	De Eendracht; 52°42′14″N 6°11′09″E	Stellingmolen	1848	Demolished 1897.	
Meppel	De Hoop; Molen van Hofman; 52°41′57″N 6°11′30″E	Stellingmolen	1841	Demolished c. 1912.	
Meppel	De Tijdgeest; 52°41′42″N 6°12′01″E	Stellingmolen	1862	Demolished post-1898.	
Meppel	De Werkorst; 52°41′17″N 6°11′22″E	Stellingmolen	1842	Demolished 1903.	
Meppel	Eekmolen; 52°41′39″N 6°11′02″E	Standerdmolen	Before 1695	Burnt down 1807.	
Meppel	Hesslinger Polder	Spinnenkopmolen	Before 1893		
Meppel	52°41′51″N 6°11′10″E			Burnt down 1542.	
Meppel	Kinkhorstermolen; 52°41′51″N 6°11′10″E	Standerdmolen	1616	Demolished between 1742 and 1766.	
Meppel	Kinkhorstermolen; 52°41′51″N 6°11′10″E	Grondzeiler	Before 1766	Demolished 1792.	
Meppel	Kinkhorstermolen; 52°41′51″N 6°11′10″E	Grondzeiler	1792	Burnt down 1855.	
Meppel	Kinkhorstermolen; 52°41′51″N 6°11′10″E	Stellingmolen	1866	Burnt down 1856.	
Meppel	Molen bij de hofstede te Vledderinge; 52°42′04″N 6°11′47″E	Standerdmolen	Before 1422		
Meppel	Molen van Blom; 52°41′45″N 6°10′35″E	Stellingmolen	1735	Burnt down 1906.	
Meppel	Molen van de firma Kniphorst; 52°41′51″N 6°11′10″E	Stellingmolen	1735	Demolished 1880.	
Meppel	Molen van Jan van Veen Egbertszoon; 52°41′40″N 6°12′06″E	Stellingmolen	c. 1880	Demolished post-1900.	
Meppel		Tjasker			
Meppel	Poldermolen aan te Brandemaatsloot; 52°41′44″N 6°12′38″E	Tjasker	c.1850		
Meppel	Poldermolen van de Wold Aa; 52°42′11″N 6°13′39″E		Before 1851	Demolished post-1865.	
Meppel	Poldermolen bij her Oude Diep; 52°42′12″N 6°11′20″E		Before 1851	Demolished post-1865.	
Meppel	52°41′46″N 6°12′23″E	Tjasker		Demolished 1850. [ Molendatabase] (in Dutch)	
Meppel	't Fortuin; 52°41′29″N 6°11′29″E	Stellingmolen	1849	Burnt down 1865.	
Meppel	't Fortuin; 52°41′29″N 6°11′29″E	Stellingmolen	1865	Burnt down 1930.	
Meppel	Tjasker van huize Reestland; 52°41′25″N 6°11′20″E	Tjasker	1918	Demolished 1938.	
Meppel	Tjasker van huize Reestland; 52°41′25″N 6°11′20″E	Paaltjasker	1938	Demolished 1958.	
Meppel	Veenemolen; 52°42′03″N 6°11′11″E	Standerdmolen	Before 1642		
Meppel	Veenemolen; 52°42′03″N 6°11′11″E	Beltmolen	Before 1769	Demolished 1830.	
Meppel	Veenemolen; 52°42′01″N 6°11′05″E		1830	Burnt down 1847.	
Midlaren	53°06′36″N 6°40′21″E	Standerdmolen		Burnt down 1890; Molendatabase (in Dutch)	
Midlaren	Molen van Hendrik van Bon; 53°06′31″N 6°41′06″E	Stellingmolen	1848	Demolished 1907. Nearest mill in photo.	
Midlaren	53°06′31″N 6°41′12″E	Stellingmolen	1836	Burnt down 1845.	
Midlaren	53°06′31″N 6°41′12″E	Stellingmolen	1846	Burnt down 1847.	
Midlaren	Molen van Westerhof; 53°06′31″N 6°41′12″E	Stellingmolen	1848	Burnt down 1907. Furthest mill in photo.	
Midlaren		Tjasker			

== N ==
Location	Name of mill and location	Type	Built	Notes	Photograph
Nietap	53°09′39″N 6°23′43″E	Stellingmolen	1802	Demolished 1930.	
Nietap	53°09′47″N 6°24′09″E	Weidemolen	Between 1832 and 1850	Demolished post-1887.	
Nietap	53°09′50″N 6°23′46″E	Stellingmolen	1835	Demolished 1910.	
Nieuw-Buinen		Achtkantmolen		Moved to Gieterveen in 1877.	
Nieuw-Buinen	Molen van Huizing; 52°56′20″N 6°53′19″E	Stellingmolen	1899	Demolished 1935.	
Nieuw-Buinen	Molen van Smid; 52°56′23″N 6°53′23″E	Stellingmolen	1859	Demolished between 1935 and 1943. Base demolished post-1990.	
Nieuw-Buinen	Molen van der Linden; 52°57′57″N 6°57′20″E	Stellingmolen	Between 1850 and 1854	Machinery removed in 1877 and installed in a mill at Gieterveen. Mill demolished in or after 1932.	
Nieuw-Buinen	Molen van Wolthuis; 52°58′16″N 6°57′42″E	Stellingmolen	1859	Demolished 1943.	
Nieuw-Dordrecht	Molen van Hovenkamp; Molen van Geertsen; 52°45′10″N 6°58′02″E	Beltmolen	Before 1860	Burnt down 1877.	
Nieuw-Dordrecht	Molen van Geertsen; 52°45′10″N 6°58′02″E	Stellingmolen	1879	Burnt down 1880.	
Nieuw-Dordrecht	Molen van Geertsen; 52°45′10″N 6°58′02″E	Stellingmolen	1880	Burnt down 1881.	
Nieuw-Dordrecht	Molen van K. Schut; Molen van der Velde; Molen van Mulder; 52°45′10″N 6°58′02″E	Grondzeiler	1884	Demolished 1954.	
Nieuwe-Krim		Tjasker			
Nieuw-Schoonebeek	Molen van Roosken; 52°38′59″N 6°58′30″E	Beltmolen	1853	Demolished between 1930 and 1939.	
Nieuw-Schoonebeek	Molen van Töller en Huser; 52°38′46″N 6°59′35″E	Stellingmolen	1871	Demolished circa 1918.	
Nieuw-Weerdinge	Molen Salomons; 52°52′08″N 6°58′30″E	Stellingmolen	c. 1880	Demolished post-1958.	
Nieuw-Weerdinge	Molen van Brinks; 52°52′08″N 7°00′30″E	Wip stellingmolen	1878	Burnt down 1880.	
Nieuw-Weerdinge	52°50′49″N 6°57′04″E	Weidemolen			
Nieuw-Weerdinge	52°51′22″N 6°57′38″E	Weidemolen			
Nijeveen	De Sterrenberg; 52°43′56″N 6°10′06″E	Stellingmolen	1977		
Nijeveen	Lutke's Meule; 52°43′47″N 6°10′04″E	Kleine molen	1990	Demolished 2009, intended to be rebuilt in New Zealand.	
Nijeveen	Tjasker Nijeveen	Tjasker		Demolished 2018.	
Nijeveen	Molen van A. Akkerman; 52°43′51″N 6°10′01″E	Stellingmolen	1833	Demolished post-1928.	
Noordscheschut	De Korenbloem; 52°43′39″N 6°32′05″E	Stellingmolen	1852	Demolished 1970.	
Noord-Sleen	Concordia; 52°47′17″N 6°48′09″E	Grondzeiler	1904	Burnt down 1906.	
Noord-Sleen	Albertdina; 52°47′17″N 6°48′09″E	Grondzeiler	1906		
Noord-Sleen	Molen Van Noord-Sleen; 52°47′17″N 6°48′09″E	Beltmolen	1850	Burnt down 1904.	
Noord-Sleen	Molen Van Noord-Sleen; 52°47′17″N 6°48′09″E	Beltmolen	1904	Burnt down 1906.	
Norg	De Hoop; 52°04′03″N 6°27′27″E	Stellingmolen	1857		
Norg	Noordenveld; 52°03′44″N 6°27′32″E	Stellingmolen	1878		
Norg	53°04′07″N 6°27′10″E	Standerdmolen	Before 1832	Demolished c.1873.	
Norg	Molen Van Noord-Sleen; 53°04′06″N 6°27′15″E	Standerdmolen	1694	Demolished 1862.	

== O ==
Location	Name of mill and location	Type	Built	Notes	Photograph
Odoorn	52°50′42″N 6°51′24″E		1843	Burnt down 1863.	
Odoorn	52°50′42″N 6°51′24″E	Beltmolen	1863		
Odoorn	52°50′49″N 6°50′30″E			Demolished post-1864.	
Odoorn	Molen; 52°50′51″N 6°38′25″E	Beltmolen			
Odoorn	52°50′58″N 6°51′04″E	Stellingmolen	1832	Demolished 1923.	
Odoornerveen	Polder 1; 52°51′13″N 6°46′15″E	Weidemolen	Before 1885		
Odoornerveen	Polder 2; 52°51′09″N 6°46′22″E	Weidemolen	Before 1885		
Odoornerveen	Polder 3; 52°50′55″N 6°47′23″E	Weidemolen	Before 1885		
Oosterhesselen	De Clinke Molen; 52°44′19″N 6°44′10″E	Grondzeiler	Before 1700	Burnt down 1941. [ Molendatabase] (in Dutch)	
Oosterhesselen	De Molen van Strick; 52°45′06″N 6°43′04″E	Grondzeiler	1800	Demolished 1951.	
Oosterhesselen	52°45′09″N 6°42′55″E				
Oosterhesselen	Molen van Draaijers; 52°45′07″N 6°43′01″E	Beltmolen	1771	Moved to Radewijk, Overijssel in 1877.	
Oosterhesselen	Molen op de Molenberg; 52°45′21″N 6°42′05″E	Standerdmolen	Before 1773	Burnt down 1863.	
Oudemolen	52°03′13.59″N 6°38′41.51″E	Standerdmolen		Moved in 1837.	
Oudemolen	De Zwaluw; 52°03′13.59″N 6°38′41.51″E	Stellingmolen	1837		
Oudemolen	De Oude Molen; 53°03′13″N 6°38′42″E	Standerdmolen	Before 1605	Blown down 1836.	
Oud-Schoonebeek		Paaltjasker	1914	Demolished 1934.	

== P ==
Location	Name of mill and location	Type	Built	Notes	Photograph
Peize	Paiser Meule; 53°08′54″N 6°29′32″E	Stellingmolen	Before 1850	Burnt down 1881.	
Peize	Paiser Meul; 52°8′54″N 6°29′32″E	Stellingmolen	1898		
Peize	Molen van Meekma; 53°08′47″N 6°29′32″E	Stellingmolen	1883	Burnt down c. 1916.	
Peize	Oude Molen; 53°08′57″N 6°28′05″E	Standerdmolen	Before 1607	Moved to Eerste Exloërmond 1860.	
Peize	Polder 1; 53°08′40″N 6°32′09″E	Weidemolen	Before 1887		
Peize	Snegelstukkeh; Molen van H. Brink; 53°08′41″N 6°31′32″E	Stellingmolen	Before 1862	Demolished before 1887.	
Pesse	Molen van Pesse; Molen van Smit; 52°46′22″N 6°26′57″E	Grondzeiler	1862	Demolished 2018.	
Pesse	Pesser Korenmolen; 52°45′50″N 6°26′45″E	Standerdmolen	Before 1645	Demolished 1849.	

== R ==
Location	Name of mill and location	Type	Built	Notes	Photograph
Roden	Molen van Roden; 53°07′52″N 6°25′41″E	Standerdmolen		Blown down or demolished c. 1551.	
Roden	Molen van Roden; 53°07′52″N 6°25′41″E	Standerdmolen	1551	Demolished c. 1831.	
Roden	Molen van Oosterhuis; 53°07′52″N 6°25′41″E	Grondzeiler	1831	Moved within Roden (Molen van Thie) 1892.	
Roden	Molen van Thie; 53°08′14″N 6°25′49″E	Stellingmolen	1892	Demolished 1920.	
Roderwolde	Woldzigt; 52°10′08″N 6°28′26″E	Stellingmolen	1852		
Roderwolde	Polder 2; 53°11′42″N 6°29′27″E	Spinnenkopmolen	Before 1862		
Roderwolde	Polder 2a 53°10′46″N 6°28′12″E	Weidemolen	Before 1862	Demolished post-1887.	
Roderwolde	Polder 2b 53°10′39″N 6°28′50″E	Weidemolen	Before 1832	Demolished before 1887.	
Roderwolde	Polder 2c 53°10′37″N 6°27′52″E	Weidemolen	Before 1832	Demolished before 1887.	
Roderwolde	Polder 2d 53°10′22″N 6°27′57″E	Weidemolen	Before 1832	Demolished post-1887.	
Roderwolde	Polder 5; 53°10′14″N 6°27′13″E	Grondzeiler			
Roderwolde	Polder Roderwolde; 53°11′00″N 6°27′54″E	Grondzeiler	1853	Demolished 1937.	
Rogat	Dickninger Molen; 52°41′07″N 6°16′28″E	Standerdmolen	1572	Burnt down 1673.	
Rogat	Dickninger Molen; 52°41′07″N 6°16′28″E	Standerdmolen	1675	Demolished 1848.	
Rogat	Dickninger Molen; 52°41′07″N 6°16′28″E	Stellingmolen	1848	Demolished 1937.	
Rolde	52°59′05″N 6°38′53″E	Grondzeiler	Between 1695 and 1731	Blown down 1836. [ Molendatabase] (in Dutch)	
Rolde	52°59′04″N 6°38′52″E	Grondzeiler	c.1836	Burnt down 1872.	
Rolde	Molen van Rolde; 52°59′04″N 6°38′52″E	Grondzeiler	1873		
Rolde	De Oude Volmolen; 52°59′11″N 6°38′53″E		1695	Demolished 1745.	
Rolde	Meule van Hiddinge; 52°59′10″N 6°38′23″E	Standerdmolen	Before 1559	Demolished 1672.	
Rolde	Meule van Homan; 52°59′10″N 6°38′23″E	Standerdmolen	1673	Demolished 1845.	
Rolde	52°59′03″N 6°39′00″E	Stellingmolen	1842	Burnt down 1897.	
Rolde	Molen van de familie Brands; 52°59′03″N 6°39′00″E	Stellingmolen	1898	Demolished 1919. Mill on right in photo.}	
Rolde	Tjasker van het Jan Beijeringsveentje	Tjasker			
Rolde	Tjasker van K. Broks	Tjasker			
Rolde	Tjasker van Popken; 52°58′49″N 6°40′15″E	Tjasker	Before 1902	Demolished post-1949.	
Roswinkel	Molen van Bruining; Molen Betting; Molen Willems; 52°50′04″N 7°02′23″E	Stellingmolen	1830	Burnt down 1926.	
Roswinkel	Molen van Wever; 52°51′08″N 7°02′25″E	Stellingmolen	1867	Burnt down 1911.	
Roswinkel	52°50′17″N 7°03′58″E	Weidemolen	1850	Demolished post-1905.	
Ruinen	52°47′17″N 6°21′55″E			Demolished 1840.	
Ruinen	De Zandplatte; 52°47′17″N 6°21′55″E	Grondzeiler	1964		
Ruinen	Kupers Meule; 52°45′57″N 6°21′34″E	Stellingmolen	1847	Demolished 1927.	
Ruinen	Meule van Eleveld; 52°45′57″N 6°21′37″E	Stellingmolen	c.1882	Demolished c.1922.	
Ruinen	Molen van Polman; 52°45′57″N 6°21′34″E	Standerdmolen	Between 1615 and 1618	Moved to Hijken before 1634.	
Ruinen	Molen van Ruinen; 52°46′14″N 6°22′01″E	Standerdmolen	Before 1615	Demolished c. 1883.	
Ruinen	Molen van Ruinen; 52°46′14″N 6°22′01″E	Standerdmolen	1673	Demolished 1927.	
Ruinen	Vulmolen van Ruinen; 52°46′16″N 6°21′04″E	Standerdmolen	Before 1713	Demolished c.1832.	
Ruinerwold	De Hoop; 52°43′21″N 6°15′03″E	Stellingmolen	1844	Demolished 1984.	
Ruinerwold	Molen van Bosman; Molen van Everts; 52°43′21″N 6°15′03″E	Stellingmolen	Before 1759	Burnt down 1930.	
Ruinerwold		Tjasker			

== S ==
Location	Name of mill and location	Type	Built	Notes	Photograph
Schiphorst	Dickninger Kloostermolen; 52°40′34″N 6°16′04″E	Standerdmolen		Moved to Waterloo 1572.	
Schoonebeek	52°38′49″N 6°54′06″E	Beltmolen	1856	Burnt out 1896, tower demolished 1930.	
Schoonebeek	52°39′50″N 6°52′23″E		Before 1832	Demolished post-1850.	
Schoonebeek	Molen van Alting; 52°39′50″N 6°52′23″E	Stellingmolen	Between 1901 and 1906	Demolished 1931.	
Schoonoord	Molen van Schoonoord; 52°50′53″N 6°45′22″E	Achtkantmolen	1854	Demolished 1903.	
Schoonoord	Molen van Schoonoord; 52°50′53″N 6°45′22″E	Stellingmolen	1903		
Schoonoord		Tjasker		Molendatabase (in Dutch)	
Schoonoord	Willem III; 52°50′45″N 6°45′19″E	Grondzeiler	1854	Demolished 1903.	
Sleen	52°46′19.02″N 6°48′01.37″E	Grondzeiler	1850	Burnt down 1914.	
Sleen	De Hoop; 52°46′19.02″N 6°48′01.37″E	Stellingmolen	1914		
Sleen	52°46′04″N 6°48′19″E	Standerdmolen	1653	Demolished 1743.	
Sleen	52°46′04″N 6°48′19″E	Grondzeiler	1743	Demolished 1924.	
Smilde	52°56′35″N 6°26′22″E	Stellingmolen	Before 1832	Demolished 1925.	
Smilde		Paaltjasker	Before 1927	Demolished post-1935.	
Smilde	Polder a 52°57′06″N 6°29′49″E	Weidemolen			
Smilde	Polder b 52°56′43″N 6°29′43″E	Weidemolen			
Smilde	Polder c 52°56′36″N 6°25′12″E	Weidemolen	1898	Demolished before 1927.	
Smilde	Polder d 52°56′30″N 6°25′11″E	Weidemolen	1898	Demolished before 1927.	
Smilde	Poldermolentje van Albert Grit; 52°56′15″N 6°25′12″E	Tjasker		Demolished post-1944.	
Smilde	Poldermolentje van E. S. van Veen	Tjasker		Demolished post-1944/	
Smilde	Poldermolentje van G. de Vries	Tjasker		Demolished post-1944.	
Smilde	Poldermolentje van J. Daling	Tjasker		Demolished post-1944.	
Smilde	Poldermolentje van W. Bos; 52°56′40″N 6°25′02″E	Tjasker		Demolished post-1944.	
Spijkerboor	Molen van Bolem Hubbeling; 52°04′35″N 6°45′50″E	Stellingmolen	1771	Burnt down 1857.	
Spijkerboor	Molen van Detmer; 53°04′37″N 6°45′51″E	Stellingmolen	1850	Demolished before 1856.	
Spijkerboor	Molen van Jan Hubbeling; Molen van Glas; 53°04′37″N 6°45′51″E	Stellingmolen	1867	Demolished 1946, base demolished 1962.	
Steenwijksmoer	Polder 16; 52°39′32″N 6°40′12″E	Weidemolen		[ Molendatabase] (in Dutch)	
Steenwijksmoer	Polder 17; 52°39′34″N 6°40′23″E	Weidemolen	Before 1885		
Steenwijksmoer		Tjasker			

== T ==
Location	Name of mill and location	Type	Built	Notes	Photograph
Tweede Exloërmond	Stelmakerij van Bossema; 52°54′49″N 6°56′50″E	Stellingmolen		Burnt down 1917.	
Tynaarlo	Windlust; Molen van Berend Ritsema; 53°04′41″N 6°37′04″E	Stellingmolen	1903	Burnt down 1926, base demolished 1978.	

== U ==
Location	Name of mill and location	Type	Built	Notes	Photograph
Uffelte	Molen van Jan Berends Mulder; 52°47′29″N 6°16′43″E	Stellingmolen	1894	Demolished 1929.	
Uffelte	Uffelter Molen; 52°47′31″N 6°15′48″E	Grondzeiler	1748	Burnt down 1857.	
Uffelte	Uffelter Molen; 52°47′31″N 6°15′48″E	Grondzeiler	1858	Moved within Uffelte 1889.	
Uffelte	Uffelter Molen; 52°47′32″N 6°17′11″E	Grondzeiler	1889	Burnt down 1909.	
Uffelte	Uffelter Molen; 52°47′32″N 6°17′11″E	Grondzeiler	1910	Demolished 1929.	

== V ==
Location	Name of mill and location	Type	Built	Notes	Photograph
Valthe	Molen van Scholte; 52°50′40″N 6°53′02″E	Beltmolen	1880	Demolished 1926.	
Valthermond	Molen van Valthermond; 52°53′29″N 6°58′53″E	Stellingmolen	Before 1879	Demolished post-1924.	
Veendijk	Molen van Oosterveen; 52°44′41″N 6°12′06″E		1846	Demolished 1854.	
Veendijk	Polder 61; 52°45′25″N 6°11′13″E	Beltmolen	Before 1883		
Veendijk	Polder 62; 52°45′33″N 6°11′56″E				
Veendijk	Polder 63; 52°44′33″N 6°14′07″E		Before 1883	Demolished 1926.	
Veenhuizen	Molen; 53°02′00″N 6°23′16″E	Beltmolen	Between 1823 and 1825	Blown down 1860.	
Veenhuizen	Molen van den Rijkswerkinrichting; 53°02′00″N 6°23′16″E	Stellingmolen	1860	Burnt down 1918.	
Veenhuizen	52°42′29″N 6°42′54″E		Before 1850		
Veenoord	52°43′02.35″N 6°50′47.21″E		1862	Burnt down c1904.	
Veenoord	52°43′02.35″N 6°50′47.21″E		1904	Burnt down 1916.	
Veenoord	Nooitgedacht; 52°43′02.35″N 6°50′47.21″E	Stellingmolen	1916		
Vledder	Molen van Vledder; 52°51′34″N 6°12′55″E	Stellingmolen	1968		
Vledder	52°51′36″N 6°12′40″E	Standerdmolen	Before 1850	Burnt down 1863.	
Vledder	52°51′36″N 6°12′40″E	Stellingmolen	1864	Burnt down 1870.	
Vledder	52°51′36″N 6°12′40″E	Stellingmolen	1870	Burnt down 1886.	
Vledder	Molen van Eleveld; 52°51′36″N 6°12′40″E	Stellingmolen	1887	Demolished 1956.	
Vledder	52°51′05″N 6°12′50″E	Standerdmolen	Before 1804	Demolished 1885.	
Vledder		Tjasker			
Vledder		Tjasker			
Vries	53°04′58″N 6°34′20″E	Standerdmolen	Before 1832	Demolished 1870.	
Vries	53°58′42″N 6°35′01″E	Stellingmolen	1857	Demolished 1921.	
Vries	Polder 3; 53°05′00″N 6°35′35″E	Weidemolen			
Vuile Riete	52°37′42″N 6°27′52″E	Weidemolen	Before 1885		

== W ==
Location	Name of mill and location	Type	Built	Notes	Photograph
Wachtum	De Hoop; 52°43′24.78″N 6°44′50.59″E	Stellingmolen	1894		
Wapse	Molen van Wapse; 52°51′18″N 6°15′02″E	Grondzeiler	Before 1832	Moved to Havelte 1914.	
Wapserveen	Molen van Krok; Molen Botter; 52°49′37″N 6°13′17″E		1849	Demolished 1903.	
Wapserveen	Molen van Smit; 52°49′47″N 6°13′31″E		Before 1806	Demolished 1837.	
Wapserveen	Molen van Toet; 52°49′27″N 6°13′02″E	Stellingmolen	1903	Demolished 1950.	
Wapserveen	52°49′14″N 6°12′30″E	Tjasker			
Wateren	Polder 17; 52°54′50″N 6°17′31″E	Tjasker			
Weerdinge	52°49′11″N 6°55′20″E		1863	Burnt down 4 June 1870.	
Weerdinge	52°49′11″N 6°55′20″E		1870	Burnt down 1909.	
Weerdinge	De Hondsrug; 52°49′11″N 6°55′20″E	Beltmolen	1910		
Weerdinge	Molen van Christopher Scholten; 52°49′12″N 6°55′21″E		1863	Burnt down 1870.	
Weerdinge	52°49′12″N 6°55′21″E		1870	Burnt down 1909.	
Weerdingermond	Molen; 52°51′56″N 6°58′40″E	Weidemolen			
Weijerswold	Molen; 52°39′30″N 6°49′15″E	Weidemolen	Before 1885		
Westerbork	D Oale Molen; De Oostereindmolen; 52°50′52″N 6°37′08″E	Stellingmolen	1877	Demolished 1926.	
Westerbork	Molen op de Roesingkamp; 52°50′52″N 6°37′08″E	Grondzeiler	1672	Demolished 1929.	
Westerbork	Molen van Helling; 52°51′10″N 6°37′05″E	Grondzeiler	1848	Moved within Westerbork (D Oale Molen) 1877.	
Westerbork		Tjasker		Demolished 1926.	
Wijster	52°48′50″N 6°30′48″E	Standerdmolen	1664	Burnt down 1858.	
Wijster	Molen van Hartsuiker; 52°48′50″N 6°30′48″E	Grondzeiler	1858	Demolished 1938.	
Wijster	Poldermolentje op de Vossenberg; 52°49′13″N 6°32′10″E	Tjasker		Demolished post-1944.	
Wijster	Poldermolentje op het Looveen I 52°49′59″N 6°30′49″E	Tjasker		Demolished post-1944.	

== Y ==
Location	Name of mill and location	Type	Built	Notes	Photograph
Yde	Yder Molen; De Windlust; 53°06′51″N 6°30′48″E	Stellingmolen	1858	Demolished 1961.	

== Z ==
Location	Name of mill and location	Type	Built	Notes	Photograph
Zeijen	Meesterveen; 52°03′06.1″N 6°33′16.1″E	Tjasker			
Zeijen	Bollenveen; 52°03′07″N 6°31′37″E	Tjasker	2001		
Zeijen	53°02′49″N 6°32′53″E	Stellingmolen	1832	Burnt down 1885.	
Zeijen	Molen van Noord; 53°02′49″N 6°32′53″E	Stellingmolen	1885	Demolished 1949.	
Zuidbarge	Zeldenrust; 52°44′57″N 6°54′32″E	Stellingmolen	1857		
Zuidlaarderveen	Polder 6a 53°06′20″N 6°44′41″E		Before 1850		
Zuidlaren	De Wachter; 52°05′57″N 6°41′44″E	Stellingmolen	1851	Twinned with Stone Cross Windmill, East Sussex.	
Zuidlaren	De Groeve	Grondzeiler		Moved to Makkum in 1906.	
Zuidlaren	53°06′08″N 6°40′56″E	Grondzeiler	1832	Burnt down 1890.	
Zuidlaren	Molentje van P. Medendorp; 53°05′51″N 6°41′19″E		1878		
Zuidlaren	Polder 7a 53°05′09″N 6°43′52″E		1902	Demolished before 1930.	
Zuidlaren	Polder A 53°05′19″N 6°38′47″E	Grondzeiler	Before 1887	Demolished before 1929.	
Zuidlaren	Polder Bulten; 53°05′58″N 6°38′38″E		1887		
Zuidlaren	Polder Burgvoort; 53°06′01″N 6°42′08″E	Wipmolen	1850	Demolished 1924.	
Zuidlaren	53°05′25″N 6°40′14″E		Before 1887		
Zuidlaren	Polder Wildeveen; 53°05′47″N 6°38′40″E				
Zuidwolde	52°40′06″N 6°25′35″E	Standerdmolen	1731	Burnt down 1877.	
Zuidwolde	De Vlijt; Hoop van Zegen; 52°40′06″N 6°25′34″E	Beltmolen	1878		
Zuidwolde	De Gunst; 52°40′47″N 6°25′39″E	Stellingmolen	1877	Burnt down 1958.	
Zuidwolde	Molen van Kerkenbosch; 52°40′47″N 6°25′39″E	Standerdmolen		Burnt down 1673.	
Zuidwolde	Molen van Lucas Stille; 52°40′47″N 6°25′39″E	Stellingmolen	1854	Burnt down 1876.	
Zuidwolde		Tjasker			
Zweeloo	52°47′36″N 6°43′35″E		Before 1839	Demolished post-1895.	

== Notes ==
Mills still standing marked in bold. Known building dates are bold, otherwise the date is the earliest known date the mill was standing.
