= Echten =

Echten is the name of a number of places in the Netherlands.

- Echten, Drenthe
- Echten, Friesland
