= Makkum =

Makkum may refer to:

== Places in the Netherlands ==
- Makkum, Drenthe, a hamlet in the municipality of Midden-Drenthe, Drenthe province
- Makkum, Littenseradiel, a village in the municipality of Littenseradiel, Friesland province
- Makkum, Súdwest-Fryslân, a village in the municipality of Súdwest-Fryslân, Friesland province

== Other uses ==
- Royal Tichelaar Makkum, a Dutch pottery company

== See also ==
- Mackem, a nickname for people from Sunderland
- Molen van Makkum, a smock mill in Makkum, Drenthe province
