= Lutke's Meule, Nijeveen =

Dutch windmill

Lutke's Meule
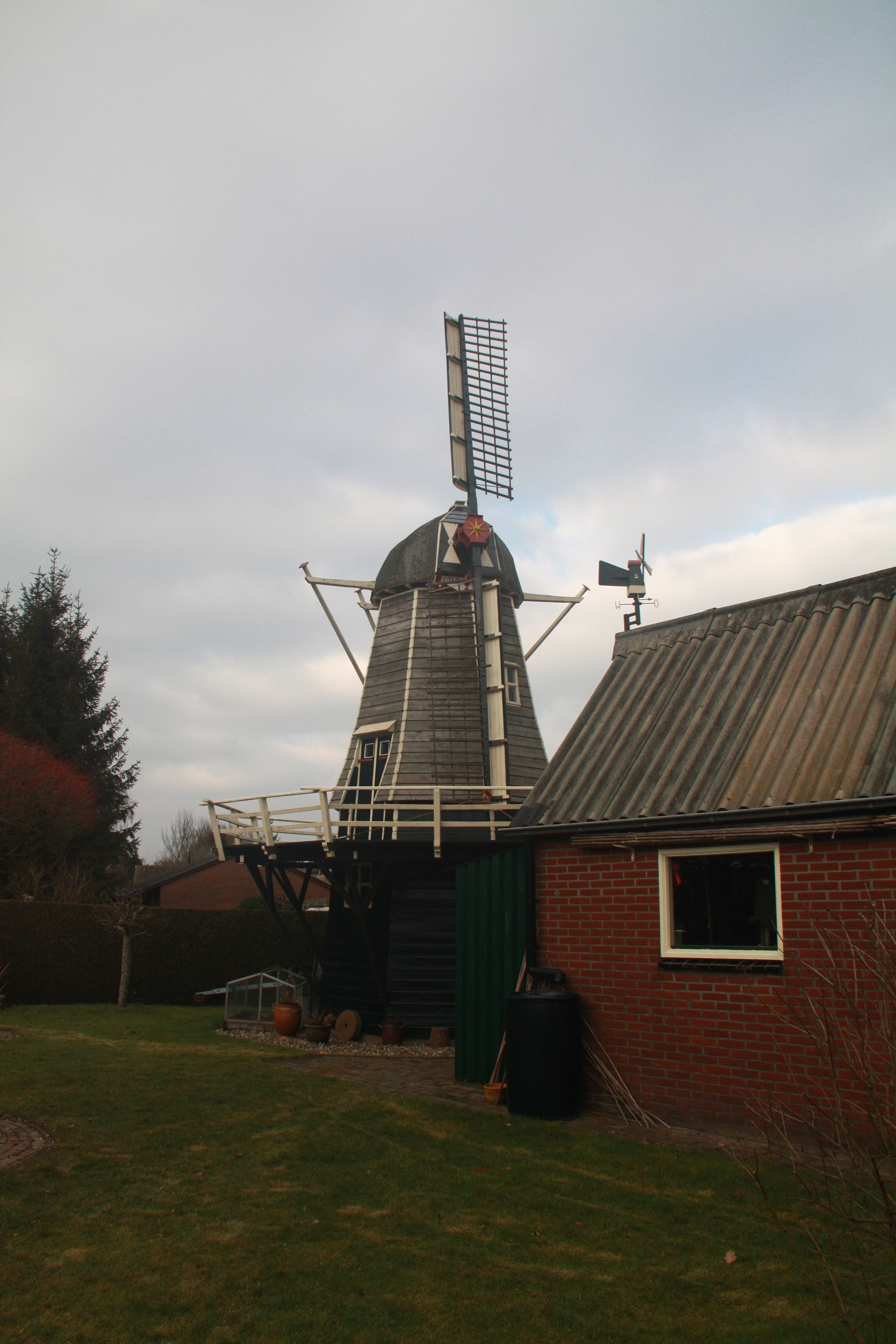
- Lutke's Meule, February 2009

Origin
- Mill name: Lutke's Meule
- Mill location: Burgemeester Haitsmanlaan 24, 7948 AE, Nijeveen
- Coordinates: 52°43′47″N 6°10′04″E
- Operator(s): G Lutke
- Year built: 1990

Information
- Purpose: Corn mill
- Type: Smock mill
- Storeys: Two-storey smock
- Base storeys: One-storey base
- Smock sides: Eight sides
- No. of sails: Four sails
- Type of sails: Common sails, Faueël streamlined leading edges
- Windshaft: Wood
- Winding: Tailpole
- No. of pairs of millstones: One pair
- Size of millstones: 600 millimetres (2 ft 0 in)
- Year lost: Dismantled 2009

Lutke's Meule was a small smock mill in Nijeveen, Drenthe, the Netherlands. It was built in 1990 and dismantled in June 2009.

== History ==
Lutke's Meule was built in 1990 by Gerard Lutke, miller at De Sterrenberg. The mill was able to turn by wind by October 1992 and a pair of millstones were installed in 1993. In 2008, one of the wooden stocks broke, reducing the mill to two sails. Development in the surrounding area had reduced the ability of the wind to power the mill. In June 2009 Lutke's Meule was dismantled. It is intended that it will be rebuilt in New Zealand.

== Description ==
Lutke's Meule was what the Dutch describe as an "achtkante stellingmolen". It was a small smock mill on a single-storey base with a stage at first-floor level, 2.30 metres (7 ft 7 in) above ground level. The base and smock were covered in weatherboards and the cap was covered in Dakleer. The mill was winded by tailpole and winch. The four Common sails had a span of 7.50 metres (24 ft 7 in). The leading edges were streamlined using the Faueël system. The sails were carried in a wooden windshaft. The mill drove one pair of 600 millimetres (2 ft 0 in) diameter millstones.
