= Stone Cross Windmill =

Tower mill in England

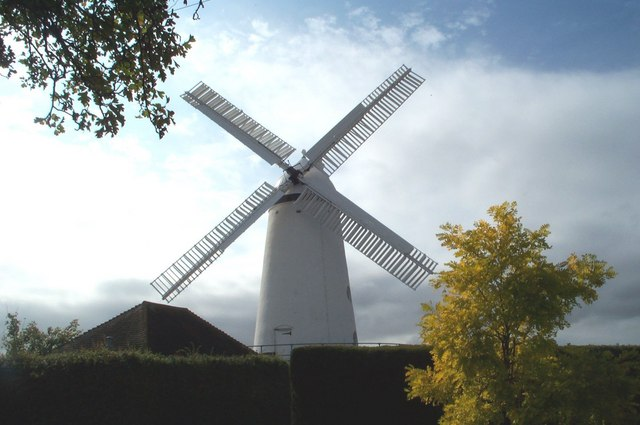
- The mill in 2007

Origin
- Mill name: Stone Cross Mill; White Mill; Blackness Mill
- Mill location: TQ 620 043
- Coordinates: 50°48′58″N 0°17′53″E
- Operator(s): Stone Cross Mill Trust
- Year built: 1876

Information
- Purpose: Corn mill
- Type: Tower mill
- Storeys: Five storeys
- No. of sails: Four sails
- Type of sails: Patent sails
- Windshaft: Cast iron
- Winding: Fantail
- No. of pairs of millstones: Three pairs

Stone Cross Windmill is a grade II* listed tower mill at Stone Cross, East Sussex, England which has been restored and is open to the public. The mill was also known as Blackness Mill and the White Mill.

== History ==
Stone Cross Windmill was built in 1876 by Stephen Neve, the Warbleton millwright. The tower was built by Thomas Honeysett, a local bricklayer and fitted out by Neve with machinery supplied by the Phoenix Iron Foundry, Lewes. Two sails were blown off in 1925. It was working by wind until 1937. The mill was used as an observation post during the Second World War. In January 1962, planning permission was granted to convert the mill into a house. Mr Ron Hall, the owner of the Mill House, bought the mill and outbuildings, and decided to restore the mill instead of converting it to residential use.

In 1966, Mr Hall started to repair the mill, which in 1977 was in a similar condition to when it stopped working, with two sails and missing the fantail. By the 1990s, the mill was getting into disrepair, and a trust was formed to buy and restore the mill. Stone Cross Mill Trust became a registered charity in 1996, and work to restore the mill began in 1998. The mill was able to produce wholemeal flour again in 2000. In 2005, the Trust were awarded a plaque by the Society for the Protection of Ancient Buildings "in recognition of the high quality of the restoration of the mill back to working order". Funding for the restoration was provided by the Heritage Lottery Fund, South East England Development Agency, East Sussex County Council and Wealden District Council. Two sails were removed in 2009 for repairs, while the other pair of sails and cap were also removed for repairs in 2011. Stone Cross Mill is twinned with De Wachter, Zuidlaren, Netherlands.

== Description ==
Stone Cross Windmill is a five-storey tower mill with a stage at first floor level. the mill has a domed cap which is winded by a fantail. It has four Patent sails carried on a cast iron Windshaft. The 8-foot-7-inch (2.62 m) diameter Brake Wheel is iron. The three pairs of millstones are overdriven. The tower is 16-foot-6-inch (5.03 m) diameter at the base and 11-foot (3.35 m) at the curb, with a height of 38-foot (11.58 m) to the curb.

== Millers ==
- Samuel Dallaway 1876 - 1878
- Frederick Dallaway 1878 - 1895
- Henry Dallaway 1895 - 1937

References for above:-
