= De Zaandplatte, Ruinen =

Dutch windmill

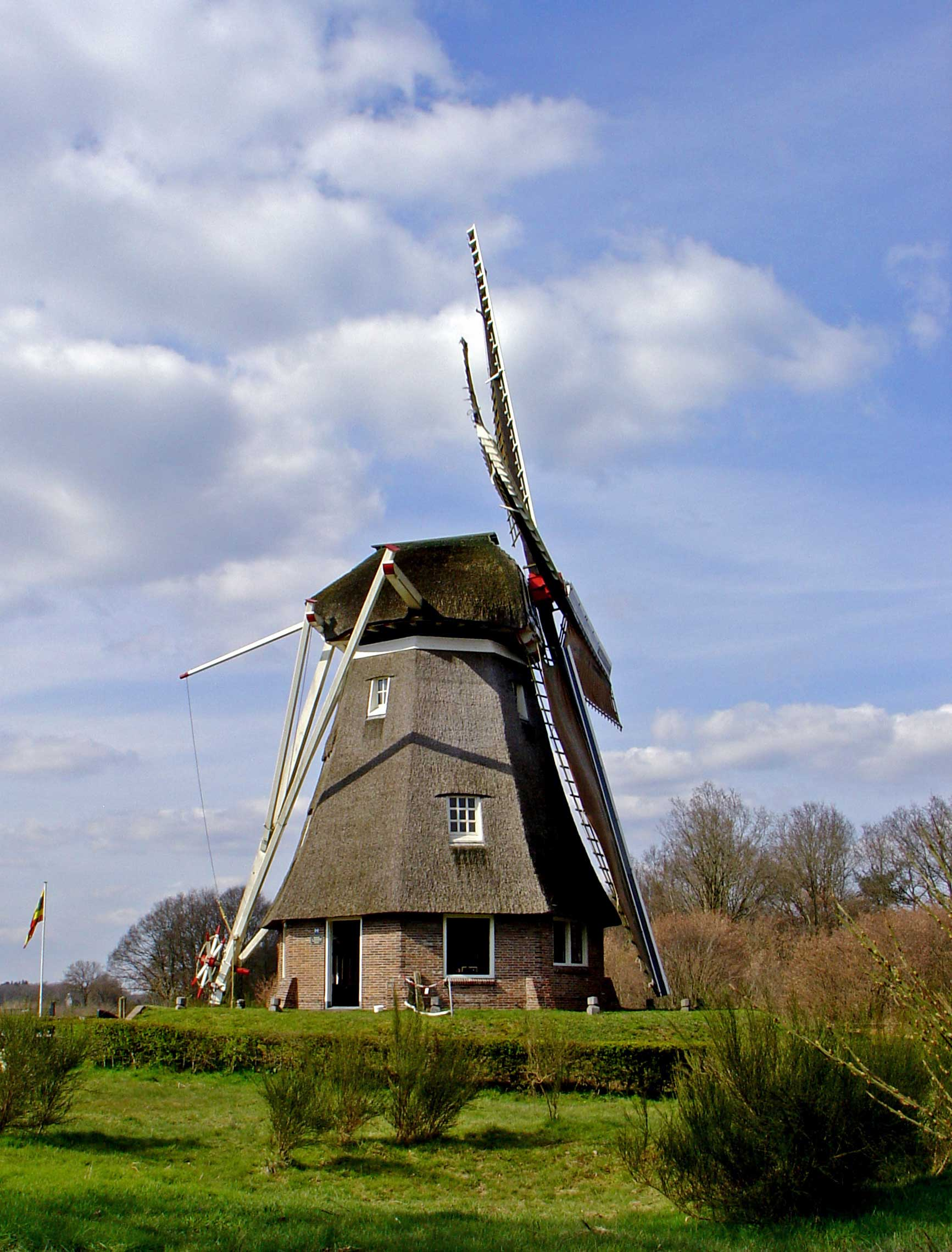
- De Zaandplatte, April 2008

Origin
- Mill name: De Zaandplatte
- Mill location: Engeland 9, 7963 PW Ruinen
- Coordinates: 52°46′17.46″N 6°21′55.21″E
- Operator(s): Stichting Vrienden van de Ruiner Molen
- Year built: 1964

Information
- Purpose: Corn mill
- Type: Smock mill
- Storeys: Two-storey smock
- Base storeys: One-storey base
- Smock sides: Eight sides
- No. of sails: Four sails
- Type of sails: Common sails
- Windshaft: Cast iron
- Winding: Tailpole and winch
- No. of pairs of millstones: Two pairs
- Size of millstones: 1.40 metres (4 ft 7 in) diameter each

De Zaandplatte is a smock mill in Ruinen, Drenthe, the Netherlands. The mill was built in 1964 and is listed as a Rijksmonument, number 422828.

== History ==
A corn mill stood on this site as early as 1673, when it was destroyed by soldiers. This mill was a post mill. It was rebuilt and stood until 1878. The present mill was built at Echten in 1866 by millwright Zilverberg for the Van Holthe family. In 1964, the mill was re-erected at Ruinen. It was used as a holiday home but its condition deteriorated over the years. In 1989 the Stichting Vrienden van der Ruinen Molen (English: Society of Friends of the Ruinen Mill) was set up to preserve the mill. In 1993 the mill was sold to the Gemeente Ruinen, who owned it until 1995 when ownership was transferred to the Stichting Vrienden van der Ruinen Molen. A restoration of the mill to full working order started in 1995. The mill was officially opened on 6 September 1996.

== Description ==
The Molen van Rolde is what the Dutch describe as an "achtkante beltmolen". It is a two-storey smock mill on a single-storey brick base. The mill is built on a mound some 1.80 metres (5 ft 11 in) high. There is no stage, the sails reaching down almost to ground level. The smock and cap are thatched. The mill is winded by a tailpole and winch. The four Common sails, which have a span of 21.70 metres (71 ft 2 in), are carried in a cast-iron windshaft, which was cast by Fabrikaat Enthoven in 1863. The windshaft also carries the brake wheel, which has 63 cogs. The brake wheel drives the wallower (31 cogs) at the top of the upright shaft. At the bottom of the upright shaft the great spur wheel, which has 88 cogs, drives the 1.40 metres (4 ft 7 in) diameter Cullen millstones and 1.40 metres (4 ft 7 in) diameter French Burr millstones via lantern pinion stone nuts which have 31 staves each.

== Public access ==
De Zaandplatte is open to the public by on Saturdays from 09:30 - 13:00, on Wednesdays and Thursdays in July and August from 14:00 - 16:30 and at other times by appointment.
