= Molen van Schoonoord =

Windmill in Schoonoord, Netherlands

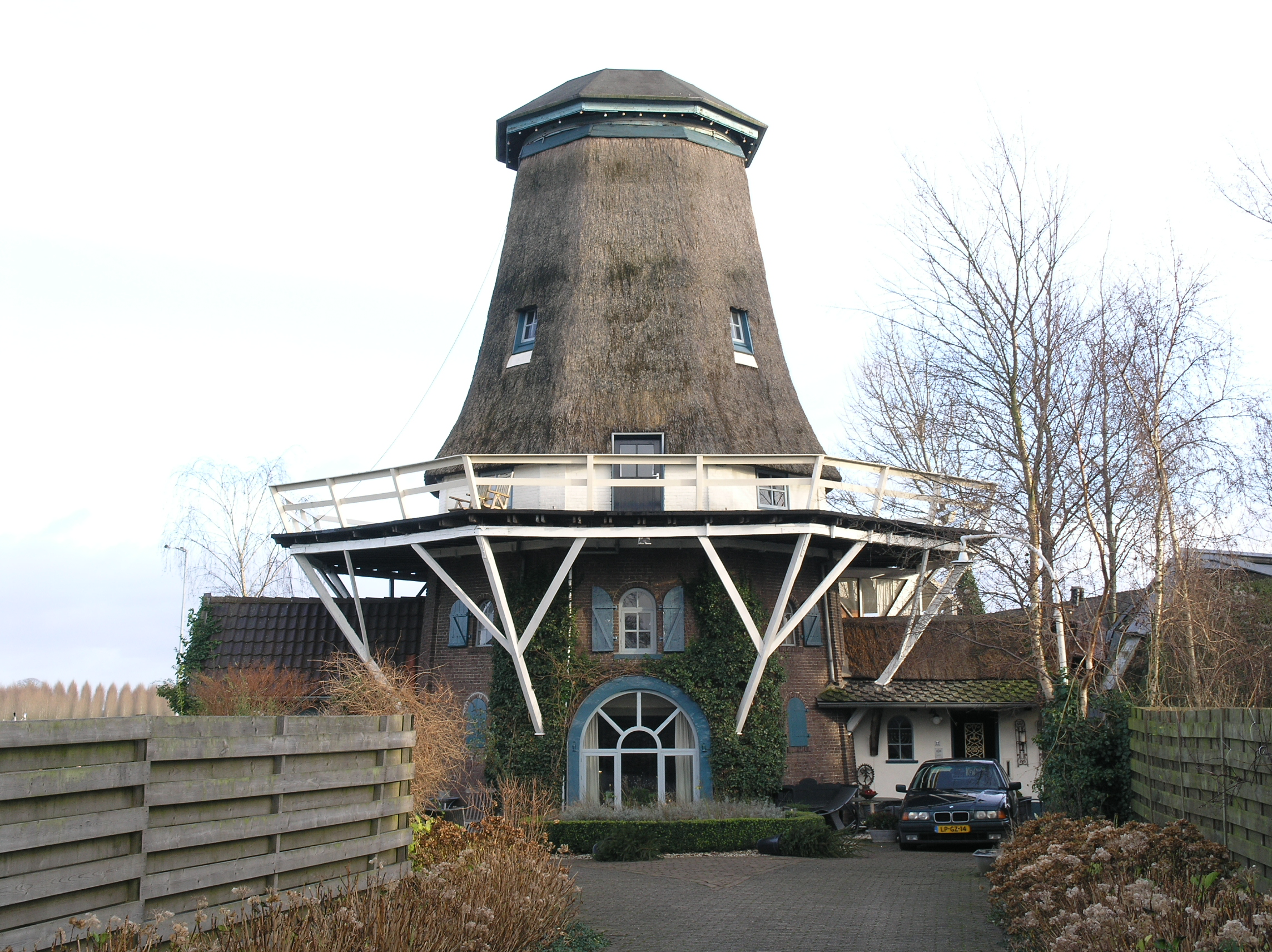

Origin
- Mill name: Molen van Schoonoord
- Mill location: Tramstraat 22, 7848 BK Schoonoord
- Coordinates: 52°50′53″N 6°45′22″E
- Operator(s): Private
- Year built: 1903

Information
- Purpose: Corn mill
- Type: Smock mill
- Storeys: Two-storey smock
- Base storeys: Three-storey base
- Smock sides: Eight sides
- No. of sails: Four sails
- Type of sails: Common sails, Van Bussel streamlined leading edges
- Windshaft: Cast iron
- Winding: Tailpole and winch
- No. of pairs of millstones: One pair

The Molen van Schoonoord is a smock mill in Schoonoord, Netherlands. The mill was built in 1903 and is listed as a Rijksmonument, number 33784. It is now used as living accommodation.

== History ==
A mill was built here in 1854. It stood until it was severely damaged in a storm in 1903, when the cap and sails were blown off. To replace it, a mill was moved here in 1903, having previously been used as an oil mill in Middelstum, Groningen, under the name Molen van Faber. The mill was built for J S de Vries. The mill was repaired in 1937 by millwright Christiaan Bremer of Adorp, Groningen. In 1946, Sails with leading edges streamlined using the Van Bussel system were fitted. The mill was working until 1952, and then stood idle. The mill was dismantled in 1978, the cap surviving alongside the mill. The smock survives to its full height, retaining the stage. The mill is used as living accommodation.

== Description ==
The Molen van Schoonoord is what the Dutch describe as an "achtkante stellingmolen". It is a two-storey smock mill with a stage on a three-storey brick base. The stage is at second-floor level, 5.50 metres (18 ft 1 in) above ground level. The smock is thatched. The mill was winded by a tailpole and winch. The four Common sails had a span of 18.00 metres (59 ft 1 in) and were carried in a cast-iron windshaft. The mill drove a single pair of millstones.

== Millers ==
- J S de Vries (1903- )
- Anne Bos
- W Wiertsema
- W F Hindriks
- H van den Berg

Reference for above:-
