= De Eendracht, Gieterveen =

Windmill in Gieterveen, Netherlands

De Eendracht
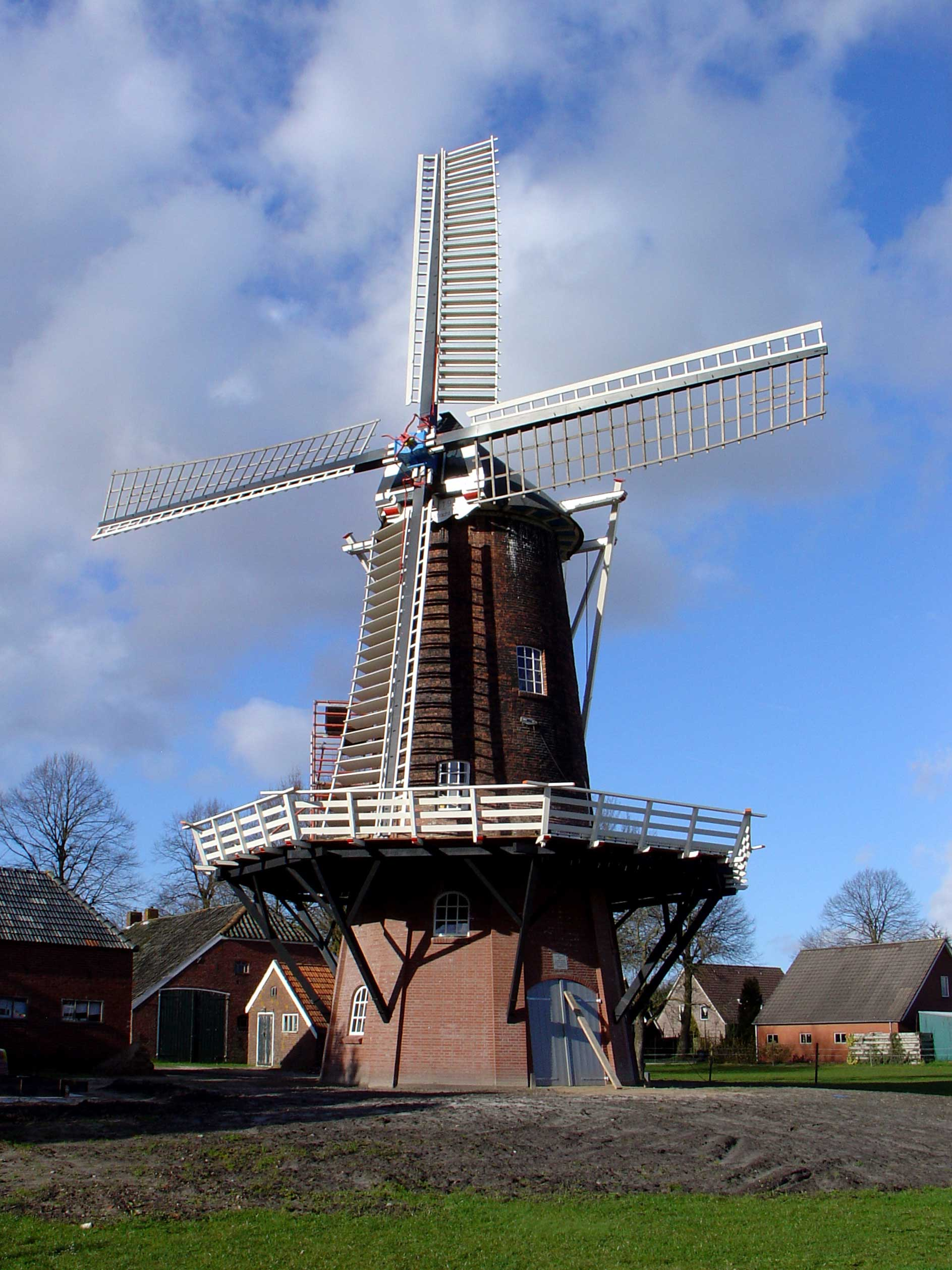
- De Eendracht, March 2009

Origin
- Mill name: De Eendracht
- Mill location: Broek 62, 9511 PV, Gieterveen
- Coordinates: 53°01′39.57″N 6°50′32.99″E
- Operator(s): Het Drents Landschap
- Year built: 1904

Information
- Purpose: Corn mill
- Type: Tower mill
- Storeys: Five storeys
- No. of sails: Four sails
- Type of sails: Two Common sails, two Patent sails
- Windshaft: Cast iron
- Winding: Tailpole and winch
- Auxiliary power: Electric motor
- No. of pairs of millstones: Two pairs, plus a third pair driven by electric motor.
- Size of millstones: 1.40 metres (4 ft 7 in) and 1.30 metres (4 ft 3 in) (wind powered); 1.20 metres (3 ft 11 in) (electric motor powered)

De Eendracht (Dutch pronunciation: [də ˈʔeːndrɑxt]) is a tower mill in Gieterveen, Drenthe, the Netherlands. It was built in 1904 and is listed as a Rijksmonument, No. 16132.

== History ==
The previous mill on this site was a smock mill originally built at Nieuw-Buinen and moved to Gieterveen in 1877 by millwright H Wiertsma of Scheemda, Groningen. In April 1904, the mill burnt down. The present tower mill was built by millwright Christiaan Bremer of Middelstum, Groningen, with the foundation stone being laid on 5 March 1905. The first owner was G Ketelaar. He sold the mill on 14 October 1905 to J Mulder for ƒ4,425. In 1939, one pair of Common sails were replaced with Patent sails. These were replaced with Common sails in 1958. The mill underwent a restoration in 1978 and again in 2002. On the death of miller Johannes Mulder in 2002, the mill was bequeathed to De Molenstichting Drenthe (English:The Drenthe Mills Society). The mill was returned to working order in 2005, but it was clear that a lot of work needed doing. The cap was removed in April 2007. The tower needed substantial repairs, and a steel "corset" was placed around the tower while repairs were made. The new cap was fitted in October 2007. The millwrights were Fabrikaat Dunning of Zuidbroek, Groningen. A new pair of Patent sails were fitted in 2008.

== Description ==
De Eendracht is what the Dutch describe as a "ronde stenen stellingmolen". It is a five-storey brick tower mill with a stage. The mill is winded by a tailpole and winch. The stage is 5.00 metres (16 ft 5 in) about ground level. The sails, which are two Patents and two Commons, have a span of 22.00 metres (72 ft 2 in). They are carried in a cast-iron windshaft which was cast by Fabrikaat J M de Muink Keizer of Martenshoek, Groningen, in 1905. The windshaft also carries the brake wheel which has 55 cogs. The brake wheel drives the wallower (27 cogs) at the top of the upright shaft. At the bottom of the upright shaft, the great spur wheel (73 cogs) drives two pairs of millstones via lantern pinion stone nuts, each having 22 staves.

== Public access ==
De Eendracht is open to the public by appointment.
