= Veenhuizen, Coevorden =

Veenhuizen
- Hamlet
- Location within Drenthe Location within Netherlands
- Coordinates: 52°42′12″N 6°42′16″E
- Country: Netherlands
- Province: Drenthe
- Municipality: Coevorden
- Elevation: 13 m (43 ft)
- Time zone: UTC+1 (CET)
  - Summer (DST): UTC+2 (CEST)
- Postal code: 7751
- Dialing code: 0524

Veenhuizen is a hamlet in the Netherlands and part of the Coevorden municipality in Drenthe. To the north of Veenhuizen is Oosterhesselen and to the east is Dalen.

Veenhuizen is not a statistical entity, and the postal authorities have placed it under Dalen. It was first mentioned in 1792 as De Veenhuizen, and means "houses in the bog". In 1840, it was home to 46 people. Nowadays, it has about 10 houses.
