= De Weert, Meppel =

Windmill in Meppel, the Netherlands

De Weert
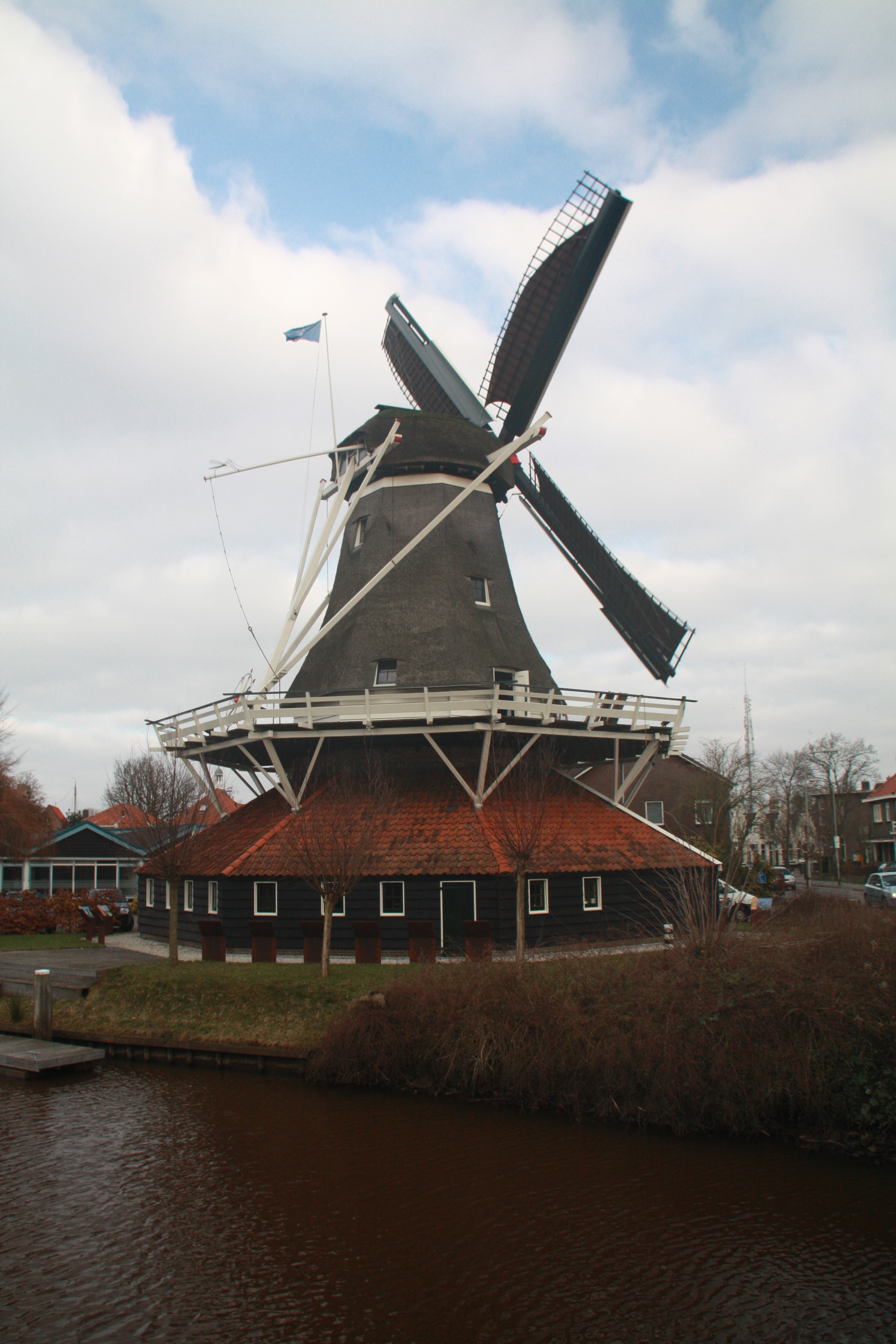
- De Weert, January 2009

Origin
- Mill name: De Weert
- Mill location: Weerdstraat 78, 7941 XH, Meppel
- Coordinates: 52°41′36″N 6°11′10″E
- Year built: 1998

Information
- Purpose: Corn mill
- Type: Tower mill
- Storeys: Three-storey smock
- Base storeys: Two-storey base
- Smock sides: Eight sides
- No. of sails: Four sails
- Type of sails: Common sails
- Windshaft: Cast iron
- Winding: Tailpole and winch
- No. of pairs of millstones: One pair
- Size of millstones: 1.50 metres (4 ft 11 in) diameter

De Weert is a smock mill in Meppel, Drenthe, the Netherlands. It was built in 1998 and is listed as a Rijksmonument, number 526385.

== History ==
De Weert is one of two survivors of over 20 windmills in Meppel. The predecessor of the current mill was built in 1807. This mill was known as the Eekmolen and it was used as a bark mill in the tanning industry. It was also known as De Reest, taking this name from the nearby river. The mill was a smock mill with a brick base and a stage. In 1825, the mill was owned by Messrs Dassen and Tenwolde. Albertus Dassen died and the mill passed to his widow. Circa 1860 the mill came into the possession of Abraham Roelink. In 1862, he had the mill altered so that it also ground wheat and produced pearl barley. Subsequent owners were W T Eilerts, Mr de Haan, L Pasman, E P Pasman (the mill the being known as Pasman's Molen) and then the Haandrikman family. The mill was worked until 1935 and demolished in 1937 leaving the base standing. The mill was in good condition at the time of demolition but was demolished on account of the high maintenance and insurance costs. The mill worked three pairs of millstones.

In 1993, Meppel resident Henk Meijerink proposed that the mill should be rebuilt. The plan was supported by Giska Eisma, an architecture student from Zwolle. The idea was put to Alderman Jan Oldebesten, who agreed that it should be done. A new smock would be placed on the surviving brick base. The Schuilenberger Molen near Hellendoorn, Friesland was to be demolished in 1994. It was decided to rebuild the Schuilenberger Molen at Meppel. The base was repaired and made for the mill. On 8 July 1998, the smock was placed on the base. The millwright was Johannes Kooistra from Sloten. The official opening was scheduled for summer 1998 but was postponed as Henk Meijerink died shortly before the ceremony was due to take place. The mill was officially opened on 13 May 1999. The mill is used to train new millers.

== Description ==
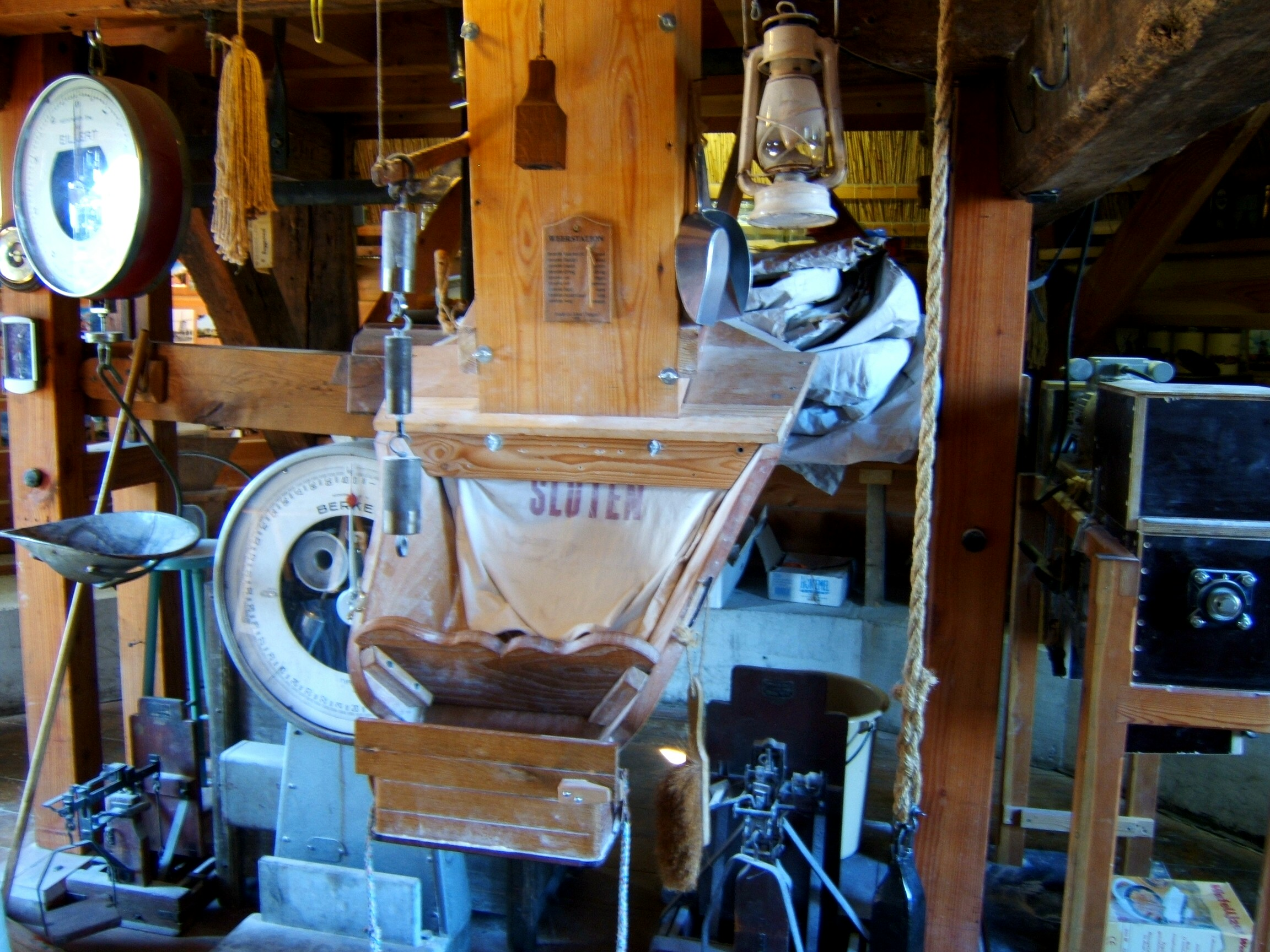
De Weert interior.

De Weert is what the Dutch describe as an "achtkante stellingmolen". It is a three-storey smock mill on a two-storey base. The stage is at second-floor level, 5.90 metres (19 ft 4 in) above ground level. The smock and cap are thatched. The mill is winded by a tailpole and winch. The four Common sails have streamlined leading edges on the Fok system. They have a span of 20.80 metres (68 ft 3 in) are carried in a cast-iron windshaft. This was cast by Fabrikaat Hardinxveld in 1997. The windshaft also carries the clasp arm brake wheel, which has 59 cogs. The brake wheel drives the wallower (29 cogs) at the top of the upright shaft. At the bottom of the upright shaft the great spur wheel, which has 85 cogs, drives the 1.50 metres (4 ft 11 in) diameter French Burr millstones via lantern pinion stone nut which has 26 staves. The millstones are driven overdrift.

== Public access ==
De Weert is open on Saturdays from 13:00 to 18:00.
