= Tjaskers in Drenthe =

Drainage windmills in the Netherlands

A tjasker is a type of small drainage windmill used in the Netherlands. There are four tjaskers remaining in Drenthe.

== Locations ==
=== Grolloo ===
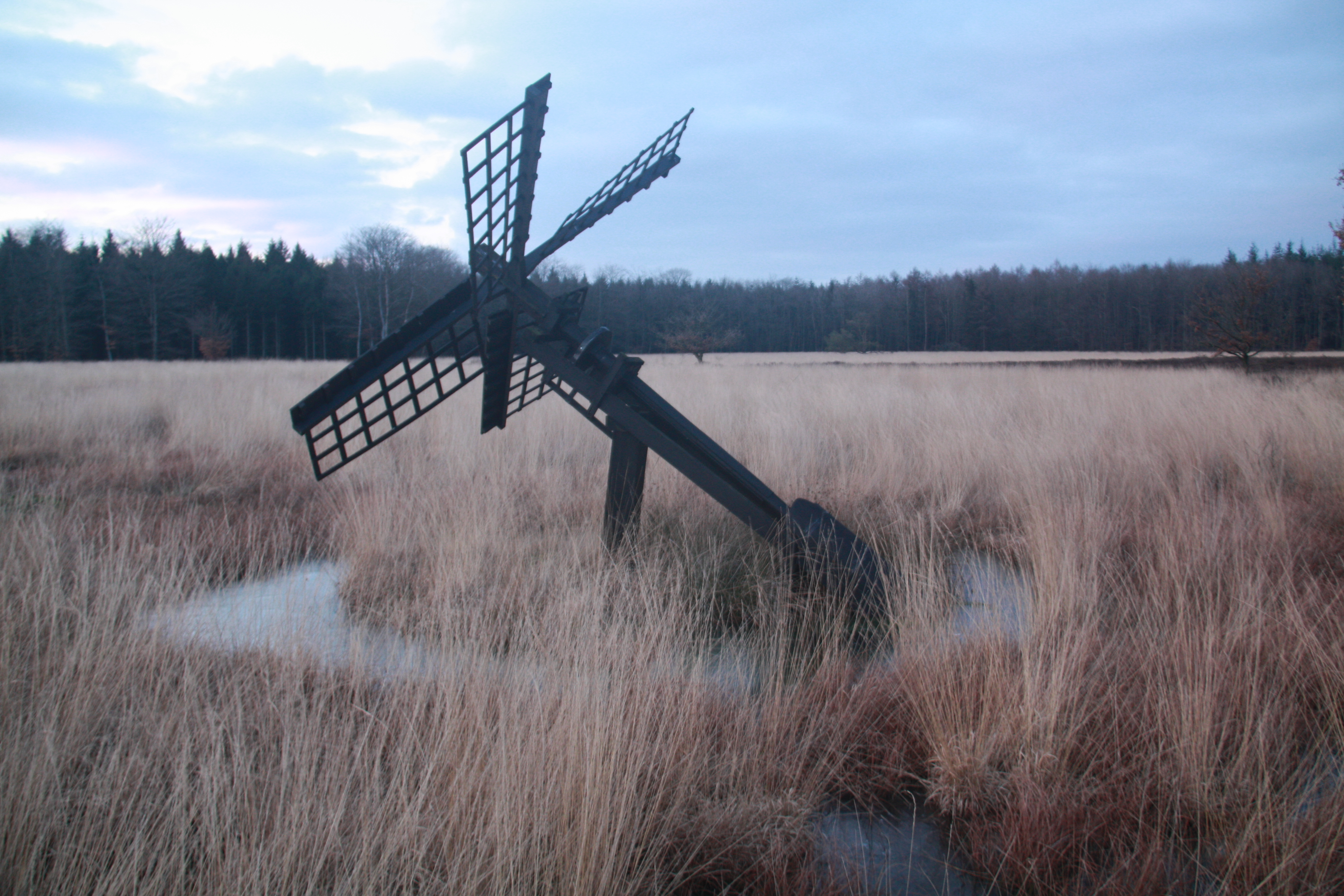
Tjasker Grolloo, February 2009

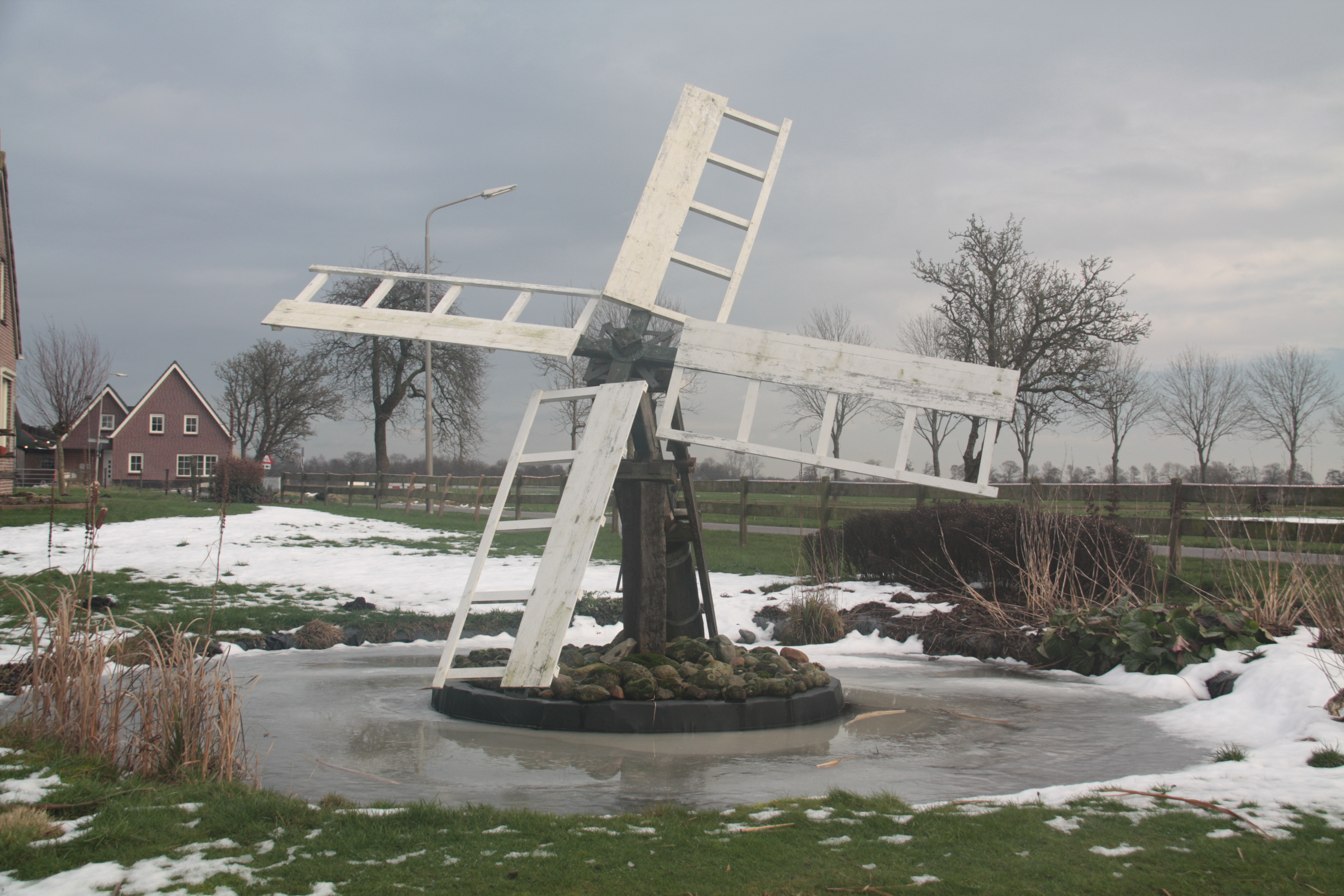
Tjasker Nijeveen, December 2009

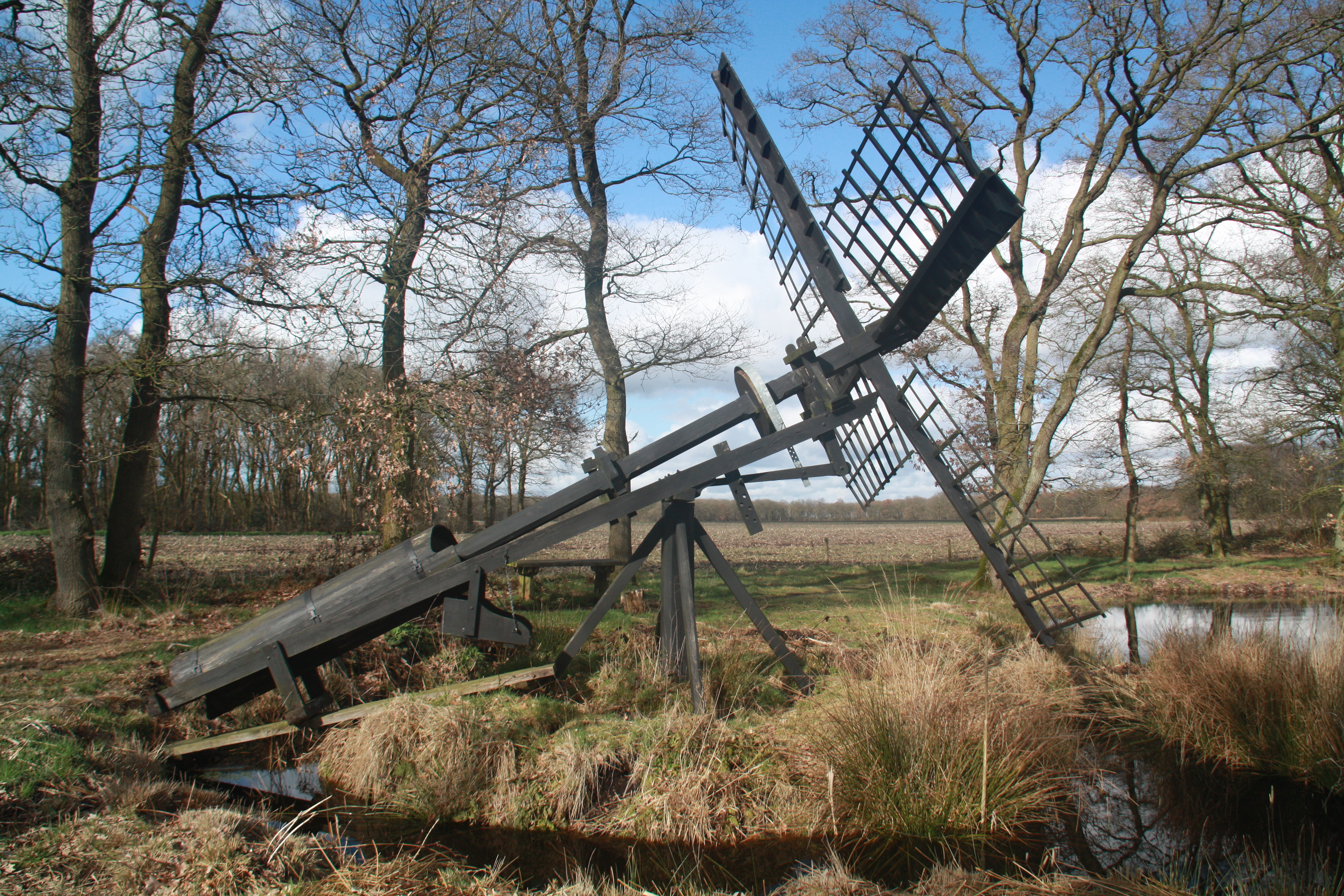
Tjasker Bollenveen, April 2009

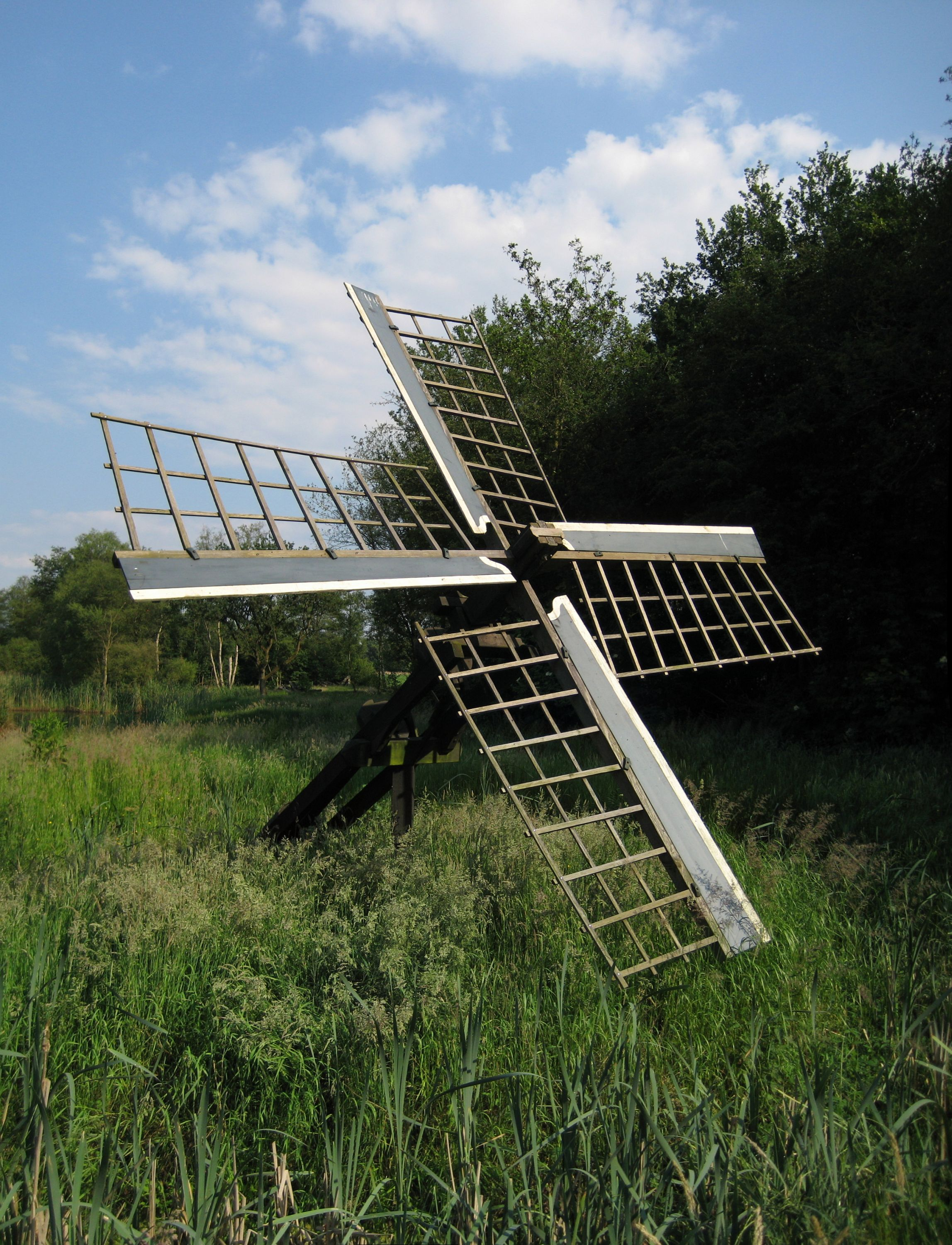
Tjasker Meestersveen, June 2008

52°54′57″N 6°39′20″E
The Paaltjasker at Grolloo was erected in June 1985. It was built in 1930 in the Dongelsveen, probably by Roelof Dijksma. The tjasker was dismantled in 1940. It now stands beside a cycle path in the Grollooërveen. The tjasker has four Common sails, which have a span of 5.40 metres (17 ft 9 in) and are carried on a wooden windshaft 6.40 metres (21 ft 0 in) long.

=== Nijeveen ===
52°44′53″N 6°09′07″E
This paaltjasker stands at Kolderveense Bovenboer, just outside Nijeveen.

=== Zeijen ===
Tjasker Bollenveen

53°03′07″N 6°31′37″E
The paaltjasker Bollenveen was built at Zeijen by volunteers in 2001 under the leadership of Waling Hofkamp. It was built near the former site of another tjasker. It is owned by the Molenstichting Drenthe (English: Drenthe Mills Society). The tjasker has four Common sails which have a span of 5.55 metres (18 ft 3 in). They are carried in a wooden windshaft which is 6.60 metres (21 ft 8 in) long.

Tjasker Meestersveen

53°03′06″N 6°33′16″E
The paaltjasker Meesterveen formerly stood at Amen where it was erected before 1940. It was discovered in the 1980s in a farmer's shed. It was erected at Zeijen in 1983 as part of a project for the unemployed. The tjasker is owned by the Molenstichting Drenthe. The four Common sails have a span of 5.50 metres (18 ft 1 in) and are carried in a wooden windshaft. The tjasker is listed as a Rijksmonument, number 413729. Photographs taken in early 2009 show that the sails have been removed.

== Dutch Wikipedia articles ==
- Tjasker Grolloo
- Tjasker Bollenveen
- Tjasker Meestersveen
