= De Sterrenberg, Nijeveen =

Windmill in Drenthe, the Netherlands

De Sterrenberg
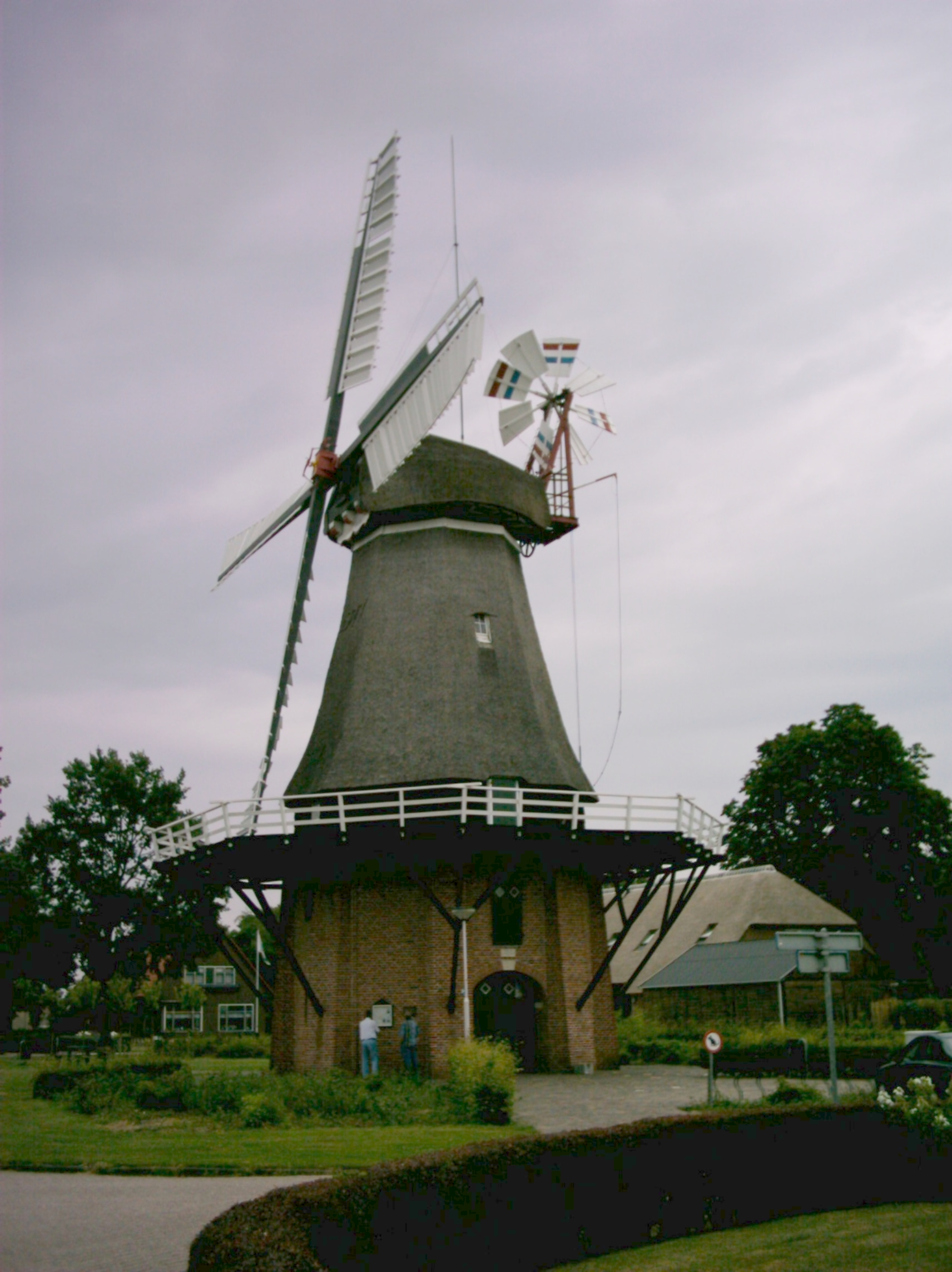
- De Sterrenberg, June 2008

Origin
- Mill name: De Sterrenberg
- Mill location: Burgemeester Weimalaan 1, 7948 AL, Nijeveen
- Coordinates: 52°43′56″N 6°10′06″E
- Operator(s): Gemeente Meppel
- Year built: 1977

Information
- Purpose: Corn mill
- Type: Smock mill
- Storeys: Three-storey smock
- Base storeys: Three-storey base
- Smock sides: Eight sides
- No. of sails: Four sails
- Type of sails: Patent sails
- Windshaft: Wood with cast iron poll end
- Winding: Fantail
- Fantail blades: Eight blades
- No. of pairs of millstones: Two pairs
- Size of millstones: 1.50 metres (4 ft 11 in) and 1.30 metres (4 ft 3 in) diameter

De Sterrenberg is a smock mill in Nijeveen, Drenthe the Netherlands. It was built in 1977. The mill is listed as a Rijksmonument, number 30957.

== History ==
The windmill in Nijeveen was demolished in 1928. In the 1970s, it was decided that Nijeveen should have a windmill again, and a search was made for a suitable replacement. De Sterrenberg was originally built at Weener, Lower Saxony, Germany in 1786. The mill was dismantled in 1976 and rebuilt brick by brick in Nijeveen. The mill is named for its former owners in Germany, the Sterrenberg family. On 13 January 1977, the smock was placed on the new brick base. The millwright responsible for the rebuild was the firm Schakel of Exmorra, Friesland. The base was built by the firm Elphenhof of De Wijk. The official opening ceremony on 11 August 1977 was performed by Prince Claus. The mill was damaged in a storm in March 1995 with various shutters being blown out of the sails. The mill was repaired by the end of that year. Major repairs to the sails were undertaken in 2002-03.

== Description ==
De Sterrenberg is what the Dutch describe as an achtkante stellingmolen, or "octagonal tower mill". It is a smock mill with a stage on a three-storey brick base. The stage is 6.15 metres (20 ft 2 in) above ground level. The smock and cap are thatched. The cap is winded by a fantail, the only windmill in Drenthe so equipped. The four Patent sails have a span of 23.00 metres (75 ft 6 in). They are carried in a wooden windshaft with a cast iron poll end. The windshaft also carries the brake wheel, which has 61 cogs. The brake wheel drives the wallower (30 cogs) at the top of the upright shaft. At the bottom of the upright shaft, the great spur wheel, which has 86 cogs, drives the two lantern pinion stone nuts, which have 28 staves each. These drive the millstones. One pair are Cullen stones of 1.30 metres (4 ft 3 in) diameter. The other pair have a French Burr runner stone on a Cullen bedstone, both 1.50 metres (4 ft 11 in) diameter.

== Public access ==
De Sterrenberg is open every Saturday from 09:00 to 12:30.
