= Molen van Makkum =

Windmill in Makkum, Netherlands

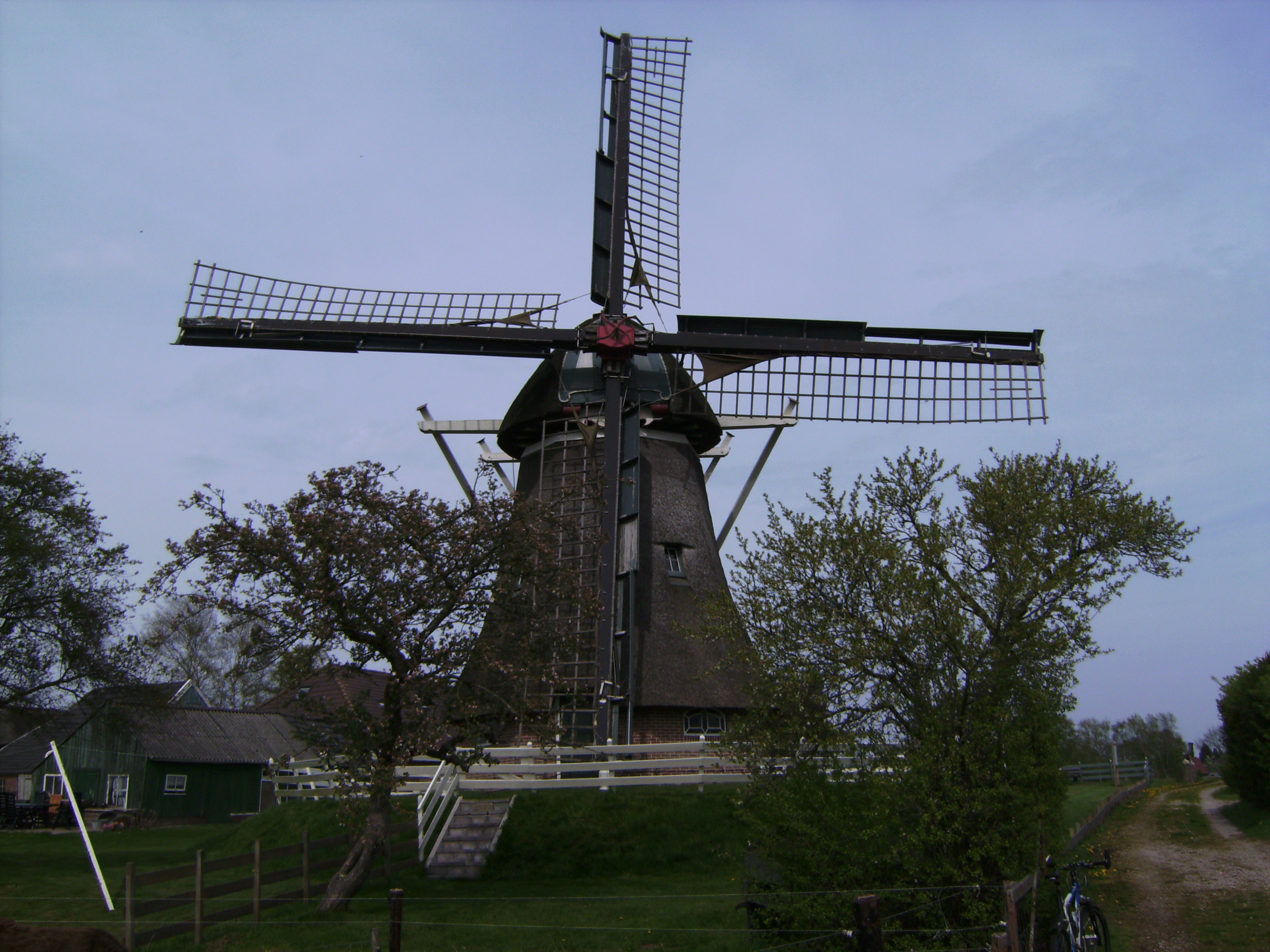
- Molen van Makkum, April 2008
- Interactive map of Molen van Makkum

Origin
- Mill location: Makkum 40, 9411 TK, Makkum-Beilen
- Coordinates: 52°50′47″N 6°31′53″E
- Operator: Private
- Year built: 1906

Information
- Purpose: Corn mill
- Type: Smock mill
- Storeys: Three-storey smock
- Base storeys: One-storey base
- Smock sides: Eight sides
- No. of sails: Four sails
- Type of sails: Common sails
- Windshaft: Cast iron
- Winding: Tailpole and winch
- No. of pairs of millstones: One pair
- Size of millstones: 1.40 metres (4 ft 7 in) diameter

The Molen van Makkum is a smock mill at Makkum, Drenthe, the Netherlands which has been restored to working order. The mill is listed as a Rijksmonument, number 8889.

== History ==
This mill replaced a post mill which blew down on 18 January 1906. It was the last post mill standing in Drenthe. The mill stood on the opposite side of the road than its replacement.

The new mill was built for Lucas Reinds of Beilen. The former polder mill De Groeve was moved from Zuidlaren and re-erected at Makkum. A new pair of sails were fitted in 1944 by millwright H Wiersma of Scheemda, Groningen. In 1957, one of the sail stocks broke, and the mill ceased to work. Restoration started in 1961 and was completed in 1964. This work was done by millwrights Doornbos and Schiemda. New sails were fitted and the mill returned to working order. During the night of 12–13 November 1973, the mill was damaged in a storm. The cap and sails were blown off the mill on 13 January 1992. The sails and windshaft were damaged beyond repair. The mill was restored in 1997 by millwright Dijkstra of Sloten, Friesland.

== Description ==
The Molen van Makkum is what the Dutch describe as an "achtkante grondzeiler". It is a smock mill without a stage, the sails reaching down almost to ground level. The four Common sails, which have a span of 19.00 metres (62 ft 4 in), have leading edges streamlined on the Fok system. They are carried in a cast-iron windshaft which was cast by Fabrikaat IJzergieterij Hardinxveld in 1998. The windshaft also carries the brake wheel which has 57 cogs. This drives the wallower (28 cogs) at the top of the upright shaft. At the bottom of the upright shaft, the great spur wheel, which has 70 cogs drives the 1.40 metres (4 ft 7 in) diameter French Burr millstones via a lantern pinion stone nut with 23 staves.

== Public access ==
The Molen van Makkum is open to the public on Saturdays from 10:00 to 16:00. It is also open when a blue flag is flying outside the mill, and at other times by appointment.
