= Echten, Drenthe =

Echten
- Village
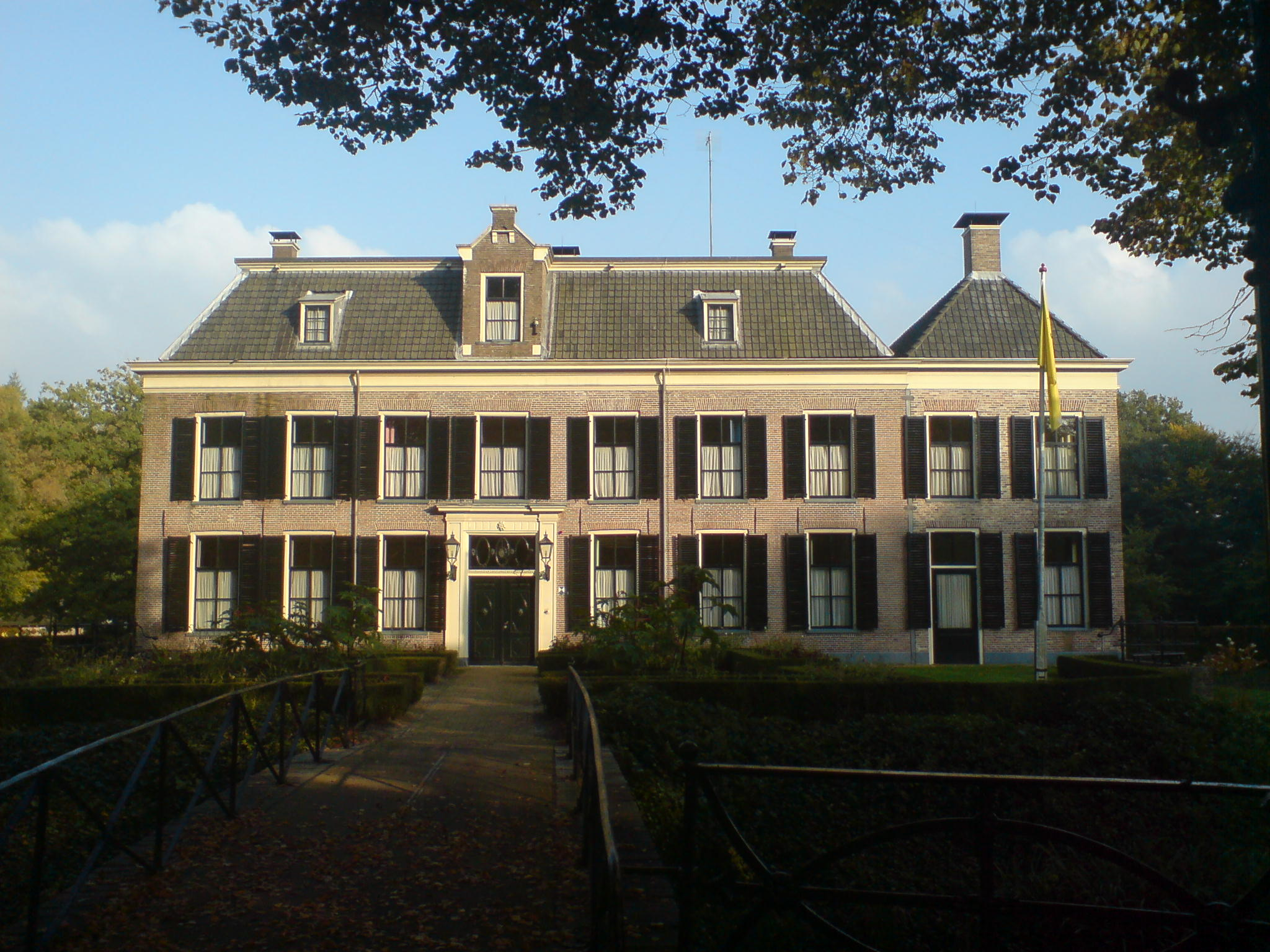
- Huis te Echten

- Location in province of Drenthe in the Netherlands Echten (Netherlands)
- Coordinates: 52.71239°N 6.39894°E
- Country: Netherlands
- Province: Drenthe
- Municipality: De Wolden

Area
  - Total: 13.94 km^{2} (5.38 sq mi)
- Elevation: 9 m (30 ft)

Population (2021)
  - Total: 365
  - Density: 26.2/km^{2} (67.8/sq mi)
- Time zone: UTC+1 (CET)
  - Summer (DST): UTC+2 (CEST)
- Postal code: 7932
- Dialing code: 0528

Echten is a village in the Dutch province of Drenthe and is part of the De Wolden municipality. The havezate Huis te Echten is located in the village.

== History ==
Echten is an esdorp which developed in the Middle Ages around Huis te Echten. It was first mentioned in 1181 as "in villa Echtene". Huis te Echten was a havezate owned by the van Holthe tot Echten family who were in possession of the area, and oversaw the excavation the peat. A havezate was a requirement to be admitted to the Knights of Drenthe. The estate is surrounded by a double moat. It has been modified and restored many times during its history. The oldest parts of the estate are from the late 15th century. It is currently in use for the blind and visually handicapped.

In 1840, Echten was home to 210 people. In 1953, an air watchtower was constructed in the forest near Echten to spot enemy planes flying under the radar. The tower was in operation until 1964. A sod house has been reconstructed in the village as a reminder of the past conditions. Het Echtens Paradijs (The Paradise of Echten) is a 1,200 hectares (3,000 acres) nature area near the village.

== Gallery ==
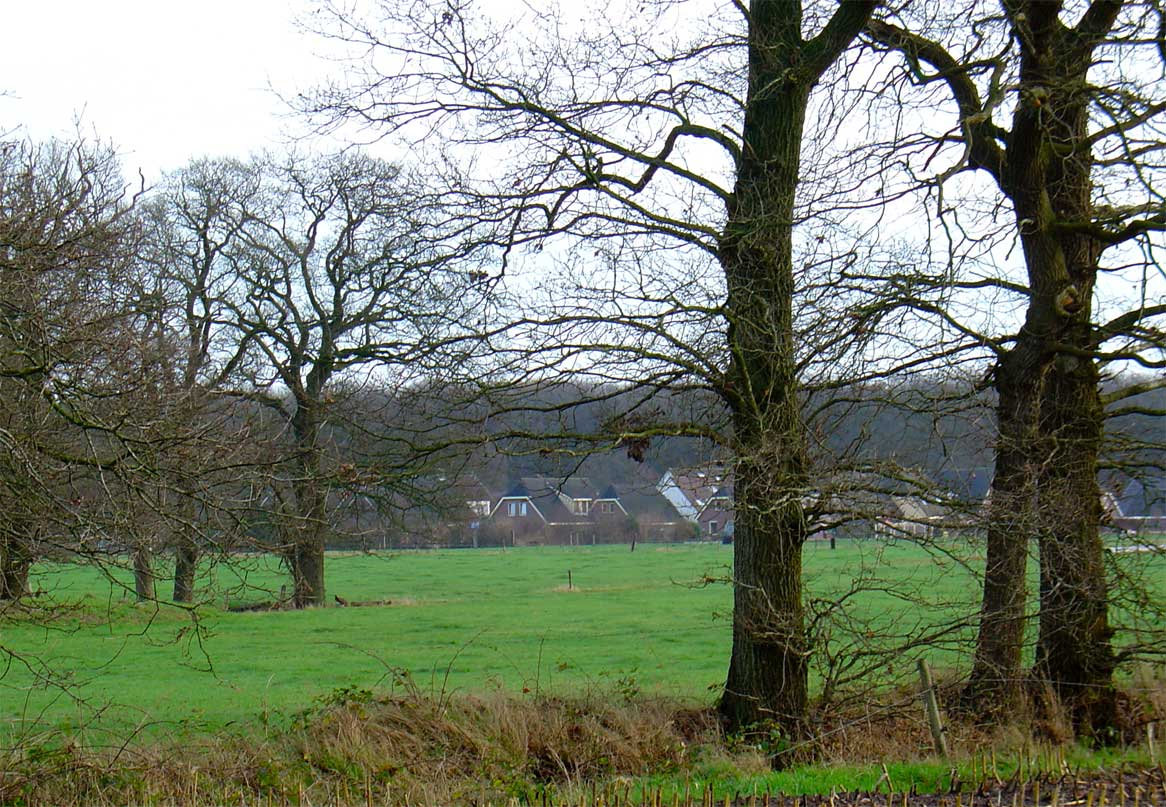
View on the village

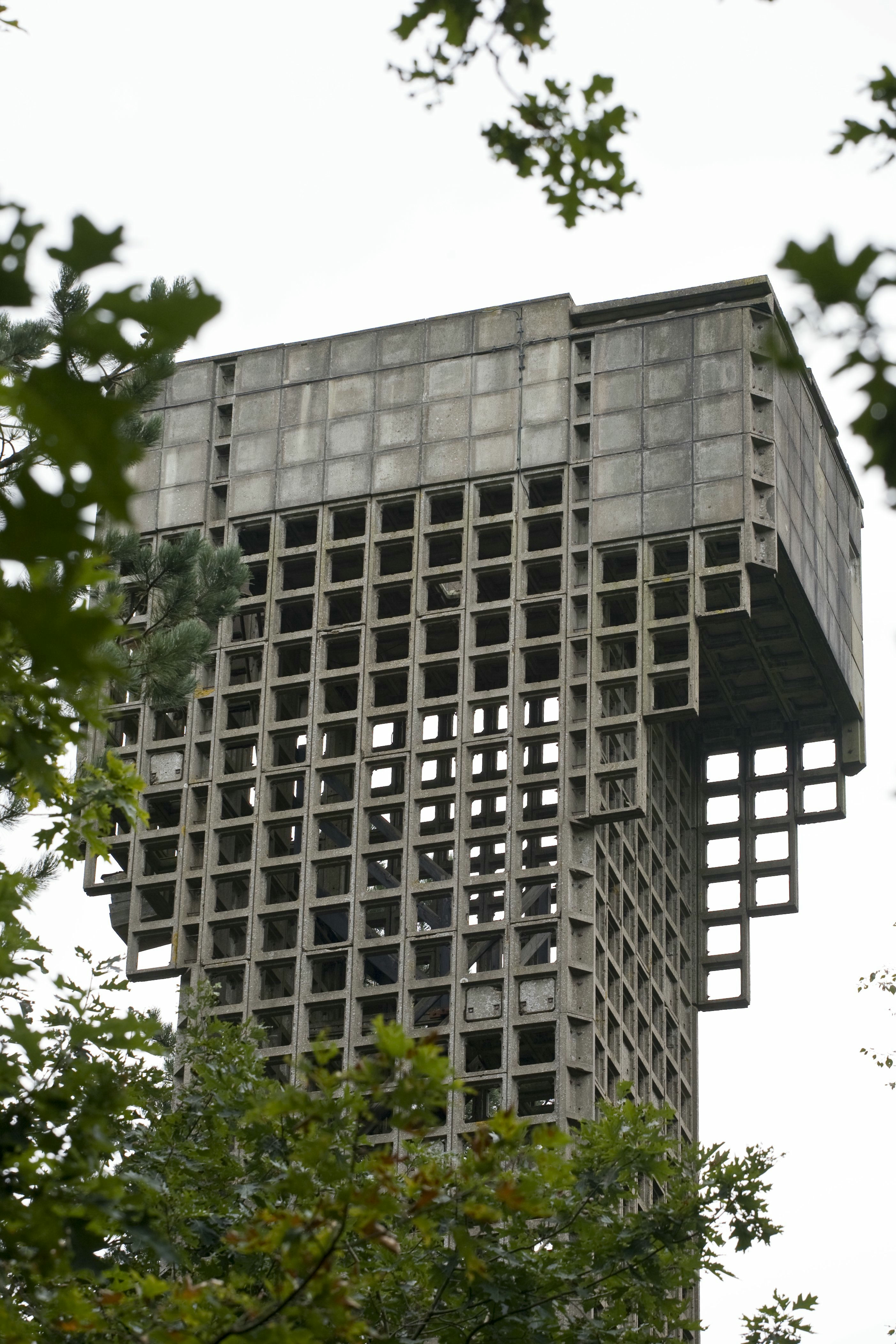
Air watchtower

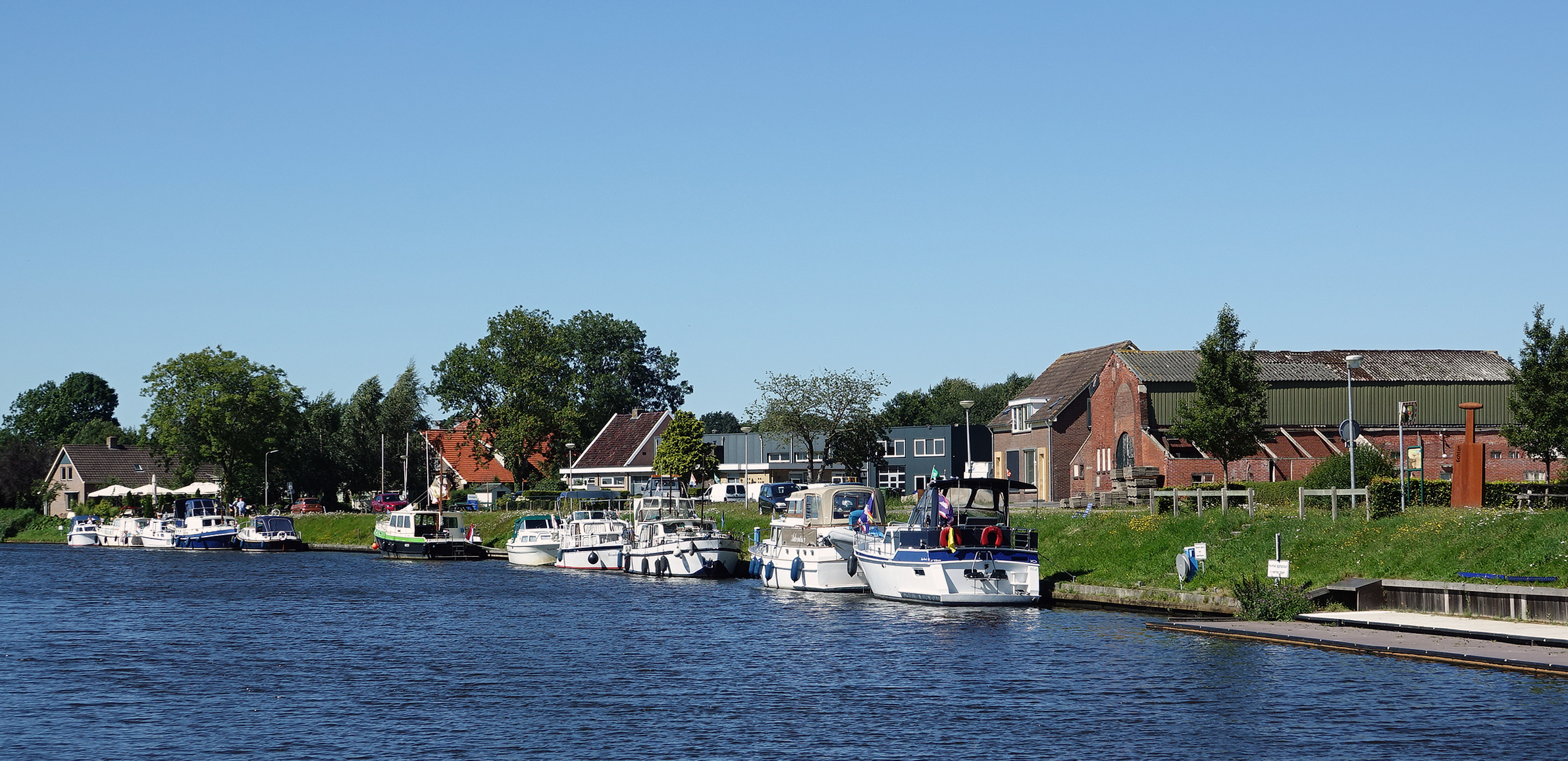
The harbour of Echten

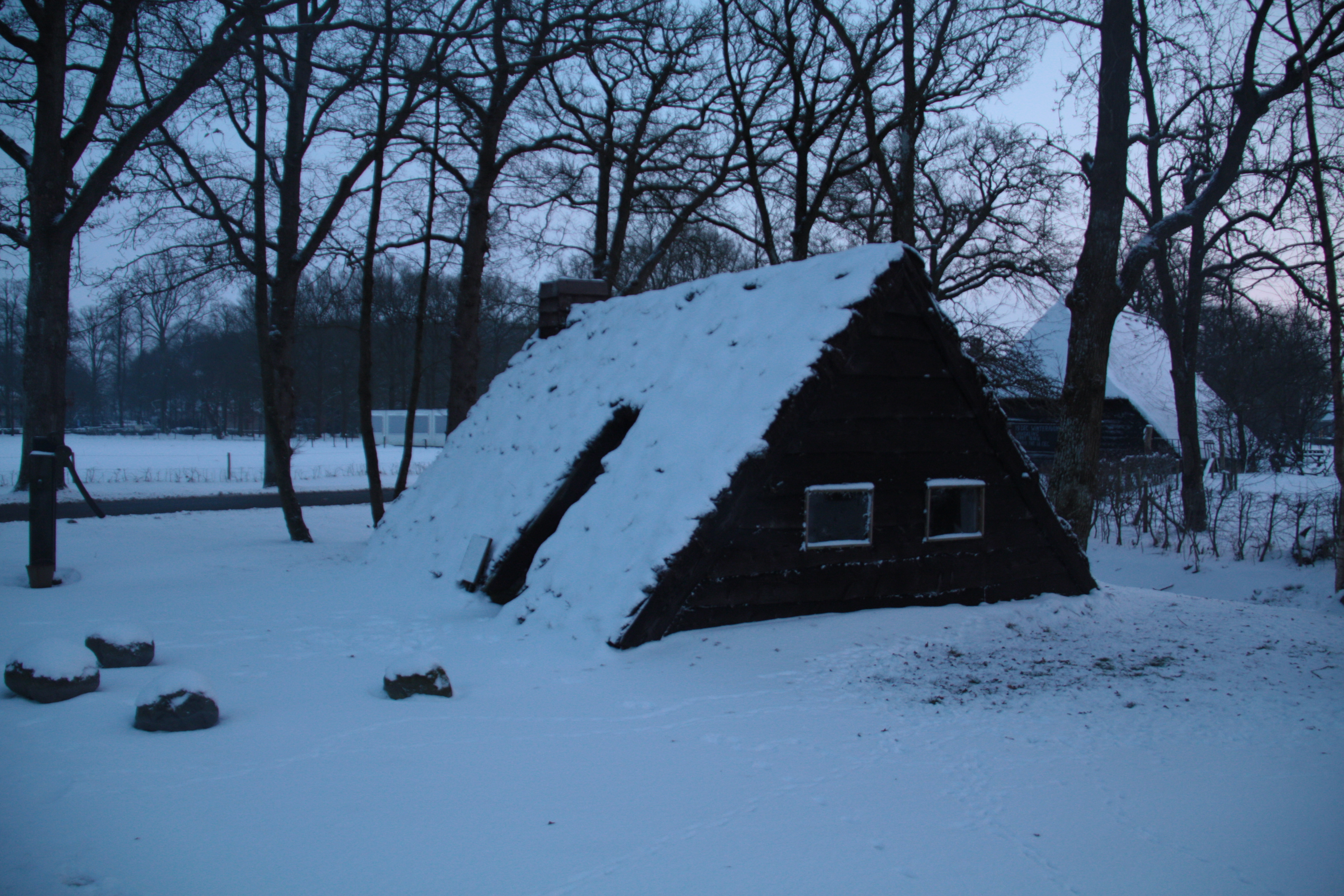
Sod house in winter
