= Langerak, Drenthe =

Langerak
- Hamlet
- Location within Drenthe Location within Netherlands
- Coordinates: 52°43′32″N 6°36′27″E
- Country: Netherlands
- Province: Drenthe
- Municipality: Coevorden
- Elevation: 15 m (49 ft)
- Time zone: UTC+1 (CET)
  - Summer (DST): UTC+2 (CEST)
- Postal code: 7917
- Dialing code: 0524

Langerak is a hamlet in the Netherlands and is part of the Coevorden municipality in Drenthe.

Langerak is not a statistical entity, and the postal authorities have placed it under Geesbrug. It was first mentioned in 1899 and means "long straight waterway" which is a reference to the Verlengde Hoogeveensche Vaart which has two bends, but is straight near Langerak. The hamlet consists of about 40 houses.
