= Den Hool =

- Hamlet
- Location within Drenthe Location within Netherlands
- Coordinates: 52°42′57″N 6°48′5″E
- Country: Netherlands
- Province: Drenthe
- Municipality: Coevorden
- Time zone: UTC+1 (CET)
  - Summer (DST): UTC+2 (CEST)
- Postal code: 7845
- Dialing code: 0591

Den Hool in 1967

Den Hool is a hamlet in the Netherlands and it is part of the Coevorden municipality in Drenthe.

Den Hool is not a statistical entity, and the postal authorities have placed it under Holsloot. It was first mentioned in 1634 as Schans ten Hole, and means "the hollow". In 1840, it was home to 40 people. Nowadays, it has about 15 houses.
