= Diphoorn =

- Hamlet
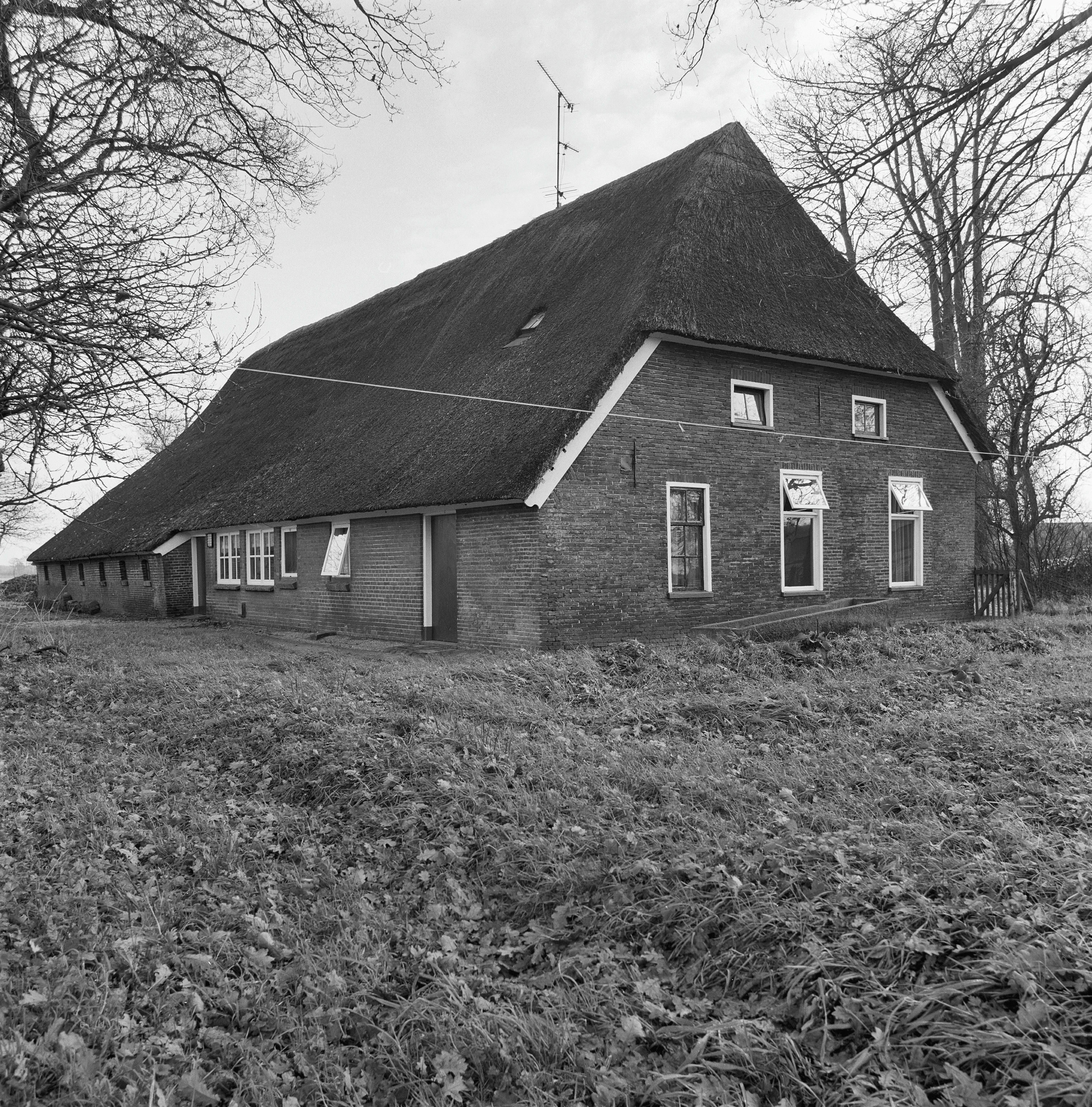
- Farm in Diphoorn

- Location within Drenthe Location within Netherlands
- Coordinates: 52°46′20″N 6°49′3″E
- Country: Netherlands
- Province: Drenthe
- Municipality: Coevorden

Area
  - Total: 0.42 km^{2} (0.16 sq mi)
- Elevation: 17 m (56 ft)

Population (2021)
  - Total: 60
  - Density: 140/km^{2} (370/sq mi)
- Time zone: UTC+1 (CET)
  - Summer (DST): UTC+2 (CEST)
- Postal code: 7842
- Dialing code: 0591

Diphoorn is a hamlet in the Netherlands and it is part of the Coevorden municipality in Drenthe.

It was first mentioned in 1542 as ten Diephoorn. The etymology is unclear. Diphoorn is dependent on Sleen, however it has its own postal code. In 1842, it was home to 82 people.
