= Grevenberg =

- Hamlet
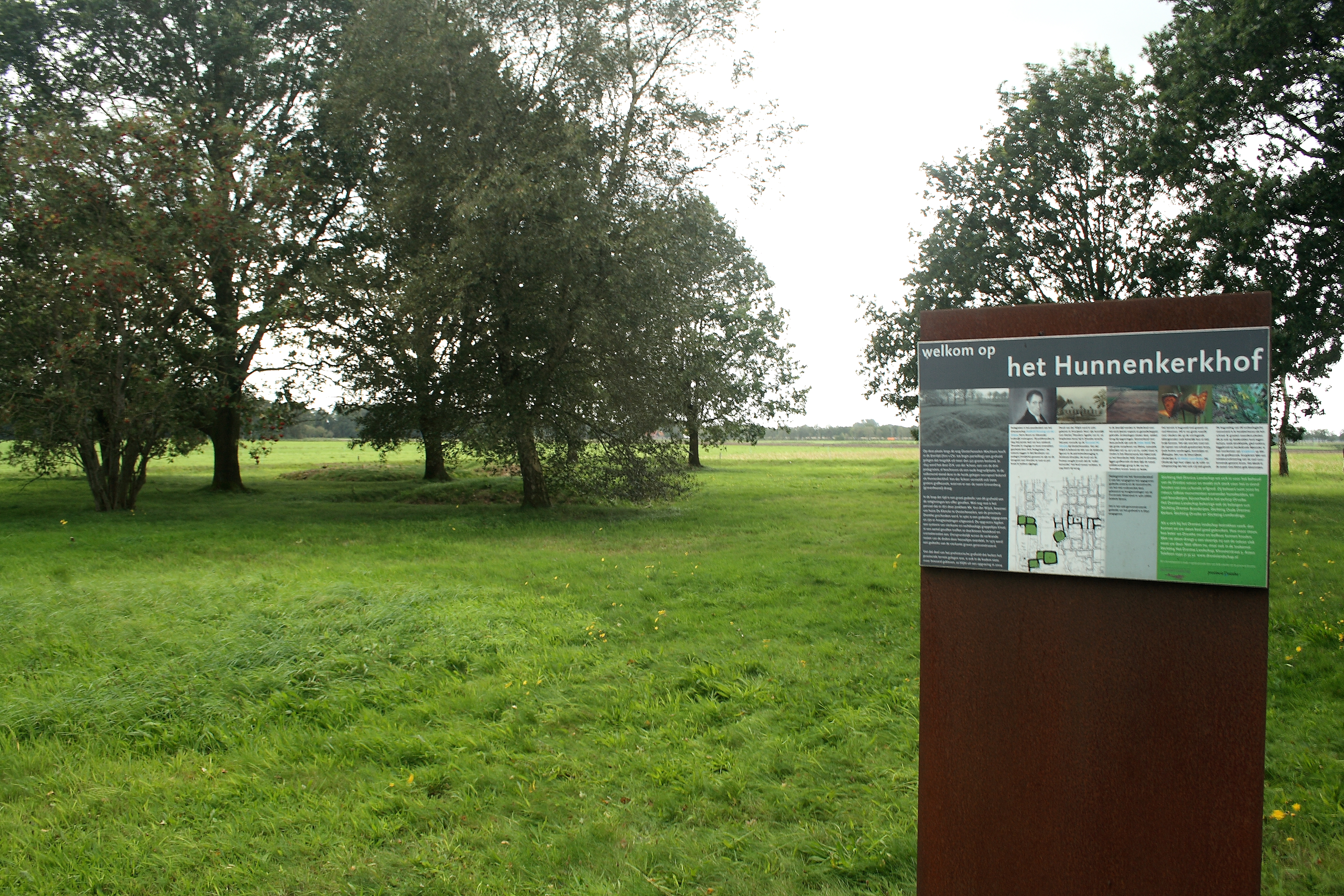
- Hunnenkerkhof near Grevenberg

- Location within Drenthe Location within Netherlands
- Coordinates: 52.7167°N 6.7549°E
- Country: Netherlands
- Province: Drenthe
- Municipality: Coevorden
- Elevation: 14 m (46 ft)
- Time zone: UTC+1 (CET)
  - Summer (DST): UTC+2 (CEST)
- Postal code: 7754
- Dialing code: 0524

Grevenberg is a hamlet in the Netherlands and is part of the Coevorden municipality in Drenthe. North of Grevenberg lies Oosterhesselen and south lies Wachtum.

Grevenberg is not a statistical entity, and the postal authorities have placed it under Wachtum. It was first mentioned in 1843, and means grave hill which is a references to a pre-historic burial mount known as Hunenkerkhof. The hamlet consist of about 25 houses.
