= Stieltjeskanaal =

- Village
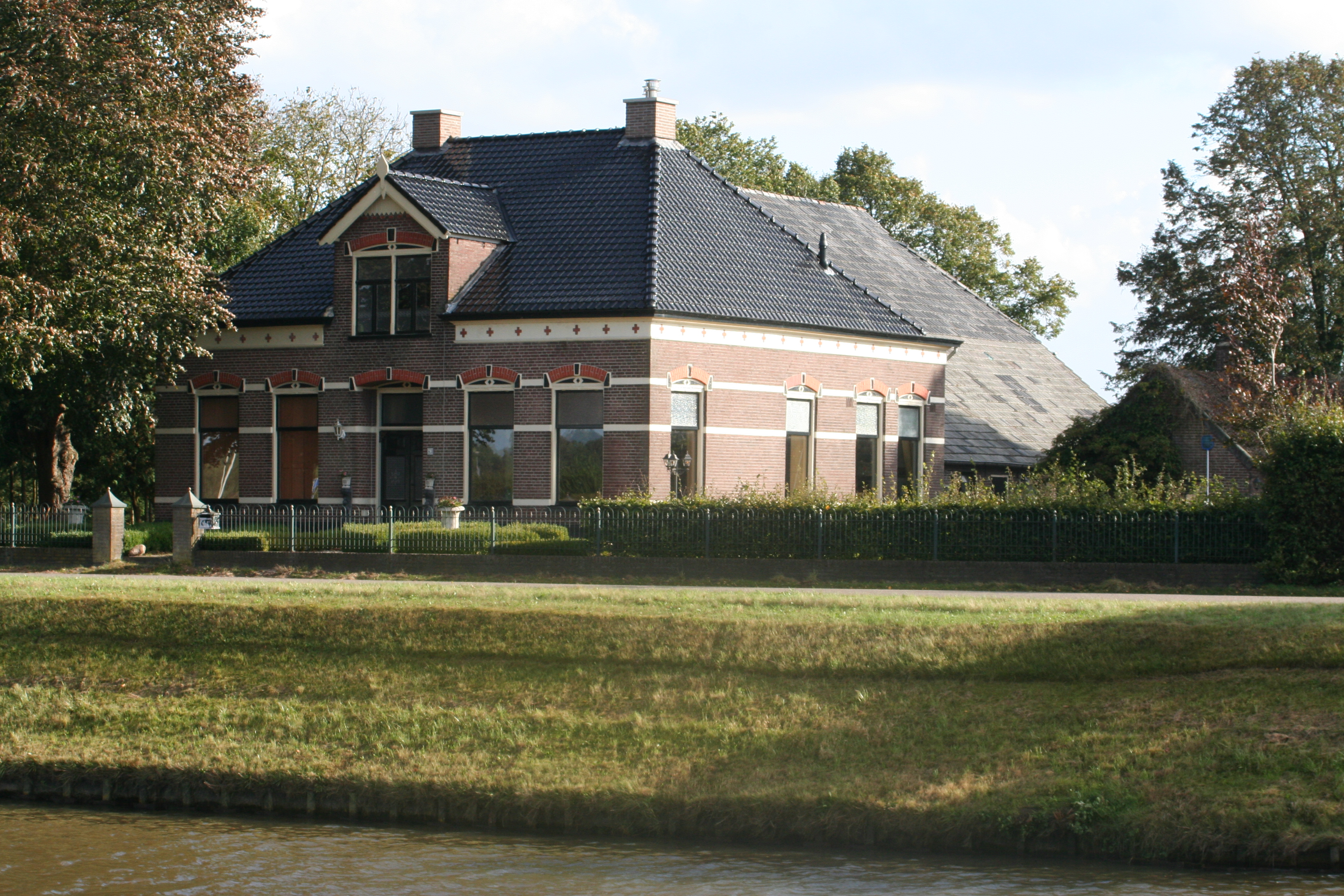
- A house in Stieltjeskanaal

- Location within Drenthe Location within Netherlands
- Coordinates: 52°40′N 6°49′E
- Country: Netherlands
- Province: Drenthe
- Municipality: Coevorden

Area
  - Total: 6.43 km^{2} (2.48 sq mi)
- Elevation: 11 m (36 ft)

Population (2021)
  - Total: 250
  - Density: 39/km^{2} (100/sq mi)
- Time zone: UTC+1 (CET)
  - Summer (DST): UTC+2 (CEST)
- Postal code: 7756
- Dialing code: 0524

Stieltjeskanaal
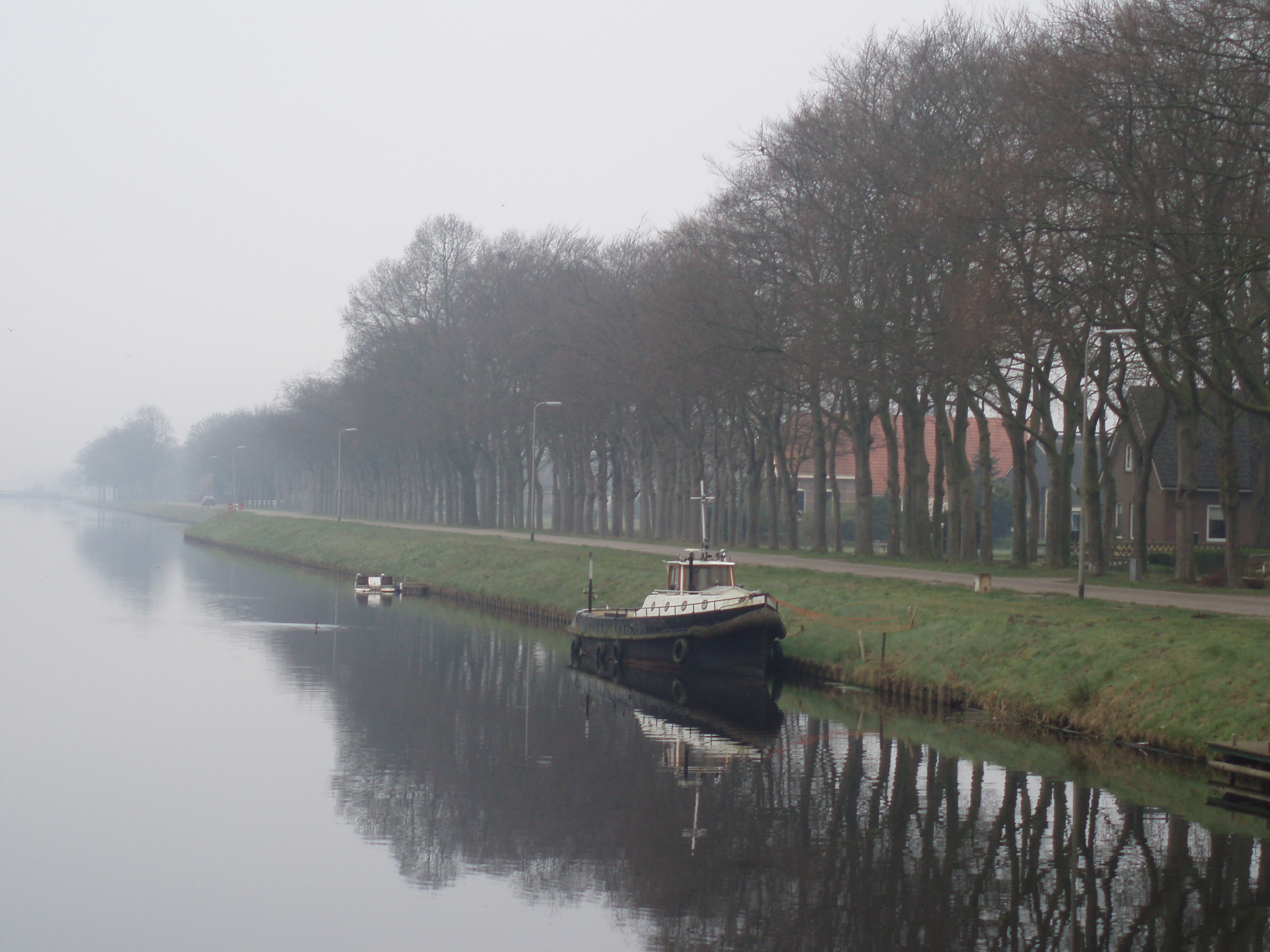
- Morning fog in the canal
- Interactive map of Stieltjeskanaal

Geography
- Start point: Coevorden
- End point: Nieuw-Amsterdam

Stieltjeskanaal is a canal and village in the Netherlands and it is part of the Coevorden municipality in Drenthe.

== History ==
=== Canal ===
On 11 April 1880, construction of the canal began, which was finished by November 1884. This canal was named after Thomas Stieltjes Sr, the father of the mathematician Thomas Stieltjes.

=== Village ===
In 1899, a village formed along the canal with the same name. It is a linear settlement and is considered a twin village of Dalerveen.

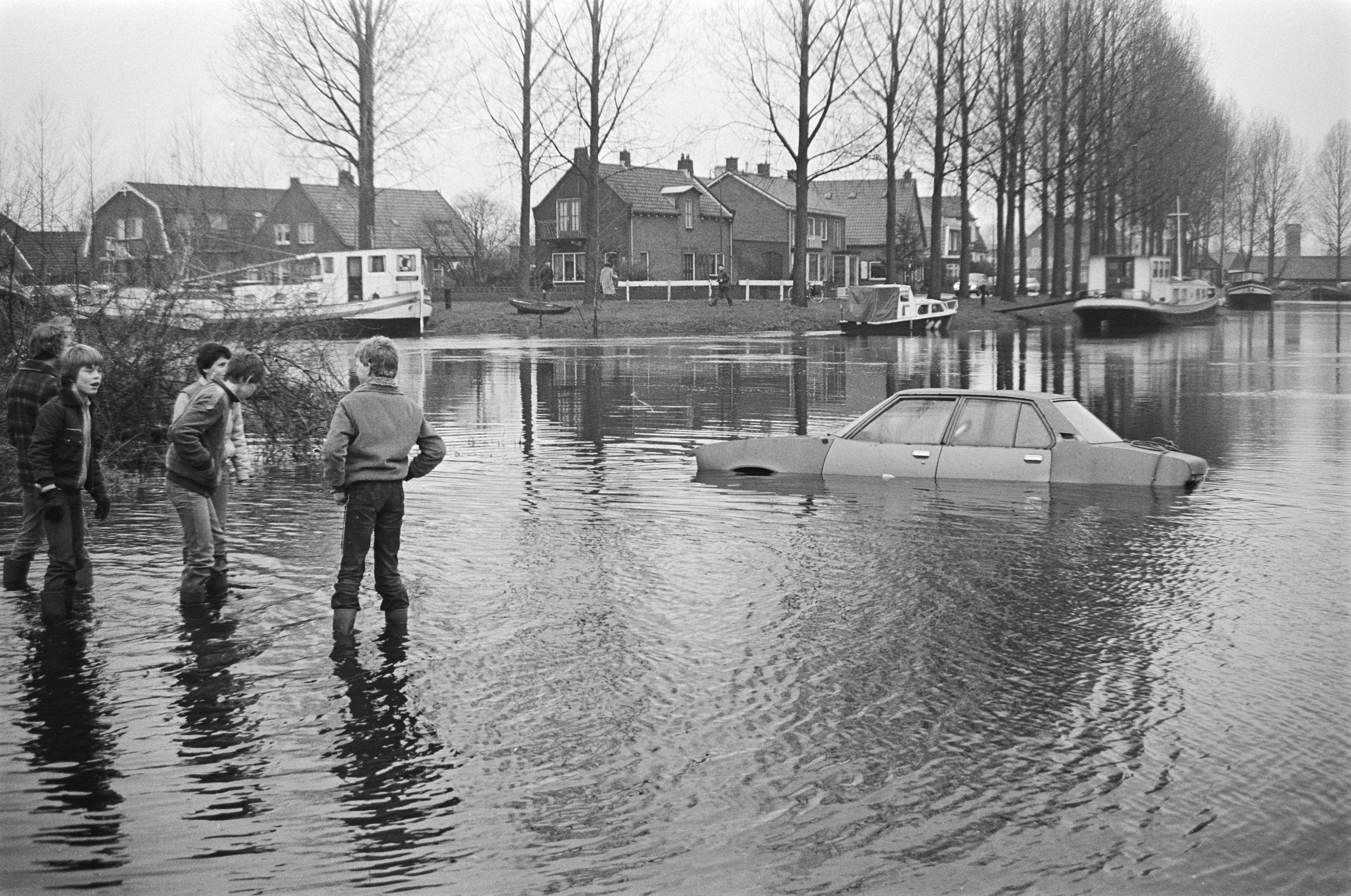
1981 flood in Stieltjeskanaal
