= Kibbelveen =

- Hamlet
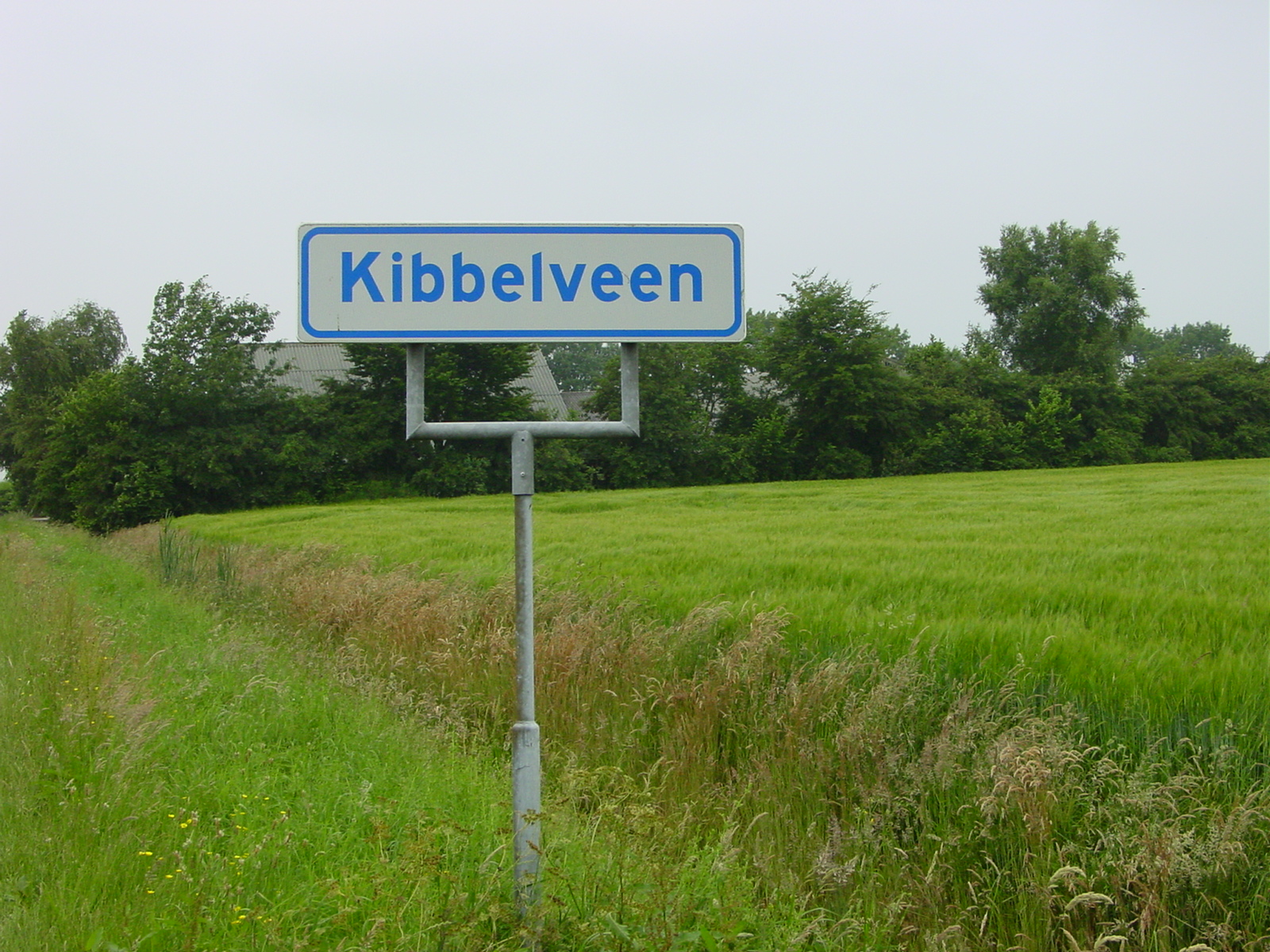
- Kibbelveen

- Location within Drenthe Location within Netherlands
- Coordinates: 52°49′21″N 6°48′25″E
- Country: Netherlands
- Province: Drenthe
- Municipality: Coevorden

Area
  - Total: 2.69 km^{2} (1.04 sq mi)
- Elevation: 19 m (62 ft)

Population (2021)
  - Total: 35
  - Density: 13/km^{2} (34/sq mi)
- Time zone: UTC+1 (CET)
  - Summer (DST): UTC+2 (CEST)
- Postal code: 7848
- Dialing code: 0591

Kibbelveen is a hamlet in the Netherlands and is part of the Coevorden municipality in Drenthe.

Kibbelveen is a statistical entity, but the postal authorities have placed it under Schoonoord. It was first mentioned in 1975, and means "bog which was disputed". The village cooperates with 't Haantje.
