= Coevorden =

Coevorden Koevern (Dutch Low Saxon)
- City and municipality
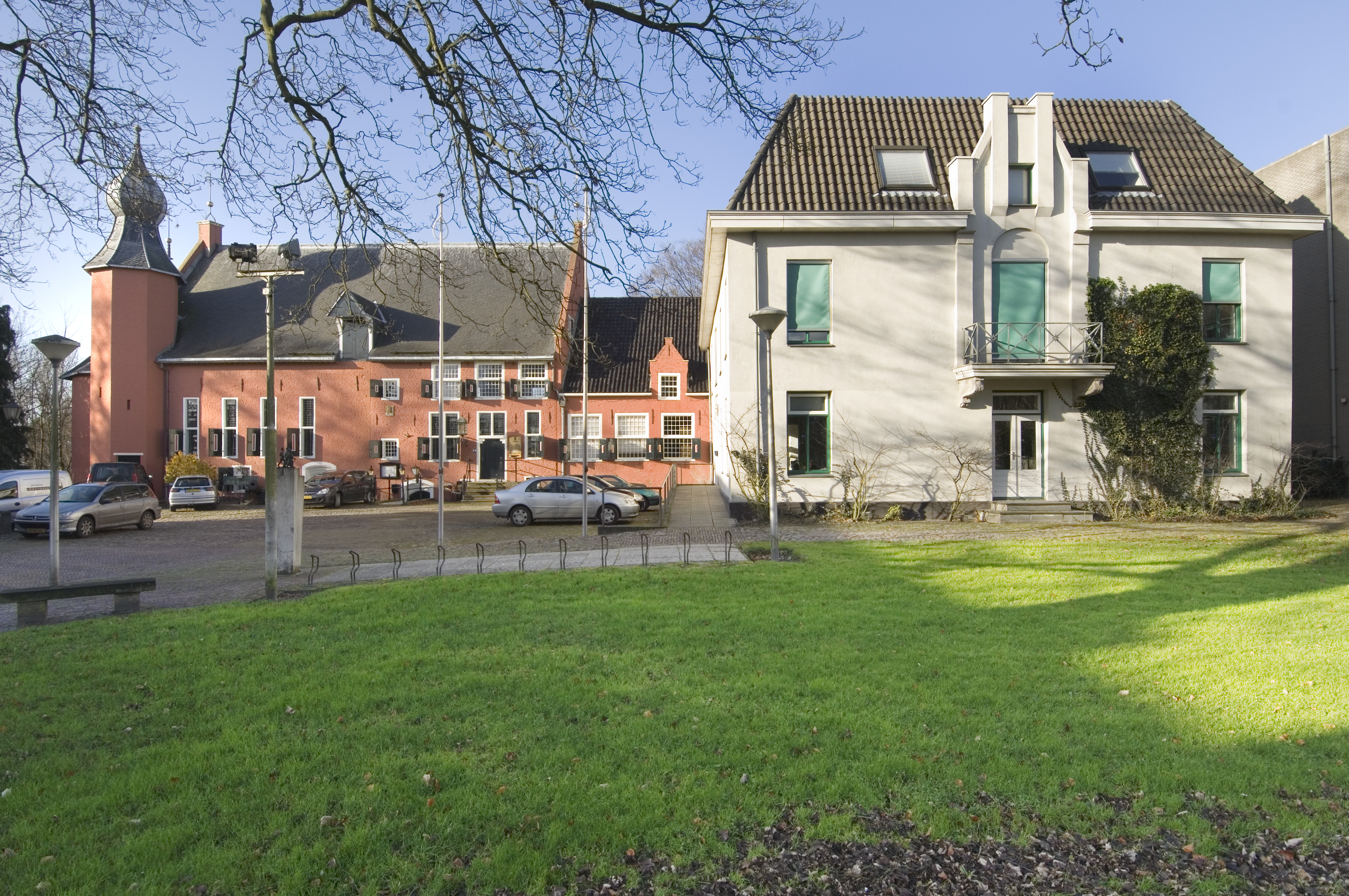
- Castle and city hall of Coevorden in 2007

- Flag Coat of arms

- Location in Drenthe
- Coordinates: 52°40′N 6°45′E
- Country: Netherlands
- Province: Drenthe

Government
  - Body: Municipal council
  - Mayor: Renze Bergsma (CDA)

Area
  - Total: 299.69 km^{2} (115.71 sq mi)
  - Land: 296.07 km^{2} (114.31 sq mi)
  - Water: 3.62 km^{2} (1.40 sq mi)
- Elevation: 12 m (39 ft)

Population (January 2021)
  - Total: 35,317
  - Density: 119/km^{2} (310/sq mi)
- Demonym: Coevordenaar
- Time zone: UTC+1 (CET)
  - Summer (DST): UTC+2 (CEST)
- Postcode: 7740–7759, 7840–7869
- Area code: 0524, 0528, 0591
- Website: www.coevorden.nl

Coevorden (Dutch pronunciation: [ˈkuvɔrdə(n)]; Dutch Low Saxon: Koevern) is a municipality and city in the province of Drenthe, in the northeast of the Netherlands. It shares a provincial border with Overijssel and an international one with Germany. The city itself is located between Emmen and Hardenberg on the N34 road, about 2 km from the German border.

Coevorden is the oldest city in Drenthe and was once a very important fortified city. The old part still has the star-shaped radial streets. It received city rights in the year 1408. The population of Coevorden today is 15,855 (1 January 2023) or 35,740 (2025) for the whole municipality. The largest town after Coevorden is Dalen.

Outside the Netherlands, the city is known for indirectly giving its name to the major Canadian city Vancouver, and also the American city Vancouver, Washington. The 18th-century British explorer George Vancouver had ancestors (and family name) that originally came to England "from Coevorden" (van Coevern in Dutch Low Saxon). There is also a family of nobility with the surname van Coeverden, sometimes spelled with a K.

== Etymology ==
The name Coevorden means "cow ford(s)" or "cow crossing", similar to Bosporus or Oxford. The first mention of the place name appears in 1036 in the name of Fredericus van Coevorden. The German name is Kuhfurt.

== History ==
=== Viscounts ===
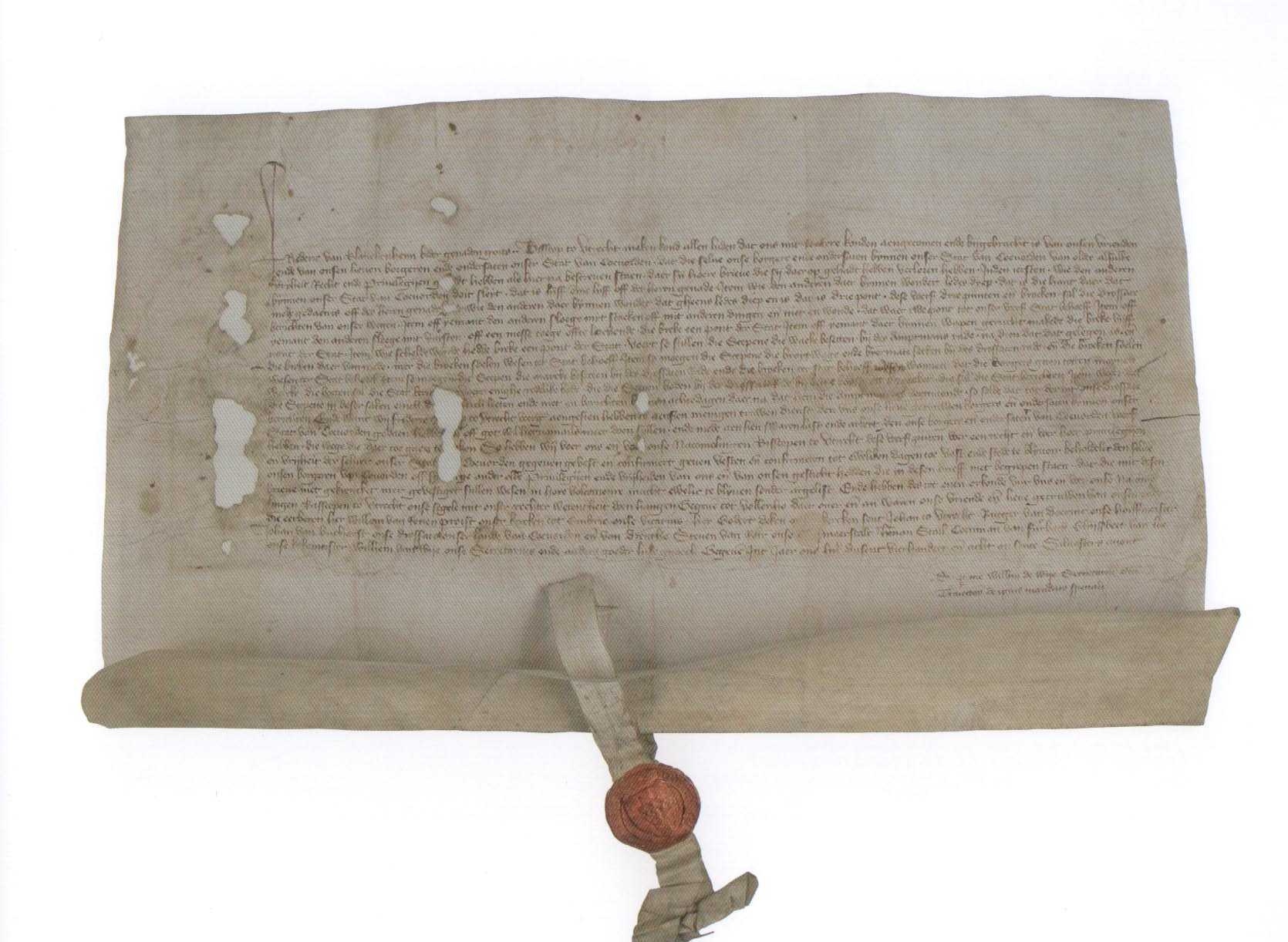
De stadsbrief van Coevorden (1407)

In 1141, Bishop Hartbert van Bierum appointed his brother, Ludolf van Bierum, to the hereditary position of Viscount of Coevorden. This made Hartbert a loyal vassal or perhaps even a puppet. After Hartbert's death, the bond between the bishopric of Utrecht and the city and lordship of Coevorden quickly weakened.

Ludolf was succeeded by his sons Volker van Coevorden and Rudolf I van Coevorden. They behaved as independent lords. This led to a siege in 1182 by Bishop Baldwin II of Holland, during which the city was largely destroyed. The bishop appointed Count Otto van Bentheim as the new lord of the castle. The Lords of Coevorden and Count Otto would dispute supremacy for many years. Between 1186 and 1192, war broke out again, during which Rudolf I van Coevorden was taken hostage. Meanwhile, Volker managed to capture the castle, with Otto's family inside. This gave the lords sufficient strength to claim power. Rudolf I van Coevorden was recognized as Viscount of Coevorden. Volker settled in Ansen and was the father of Rudolf II van Coevorden, who would become Viscount of Coevorden.

=== Rebellion against Utrecht ===
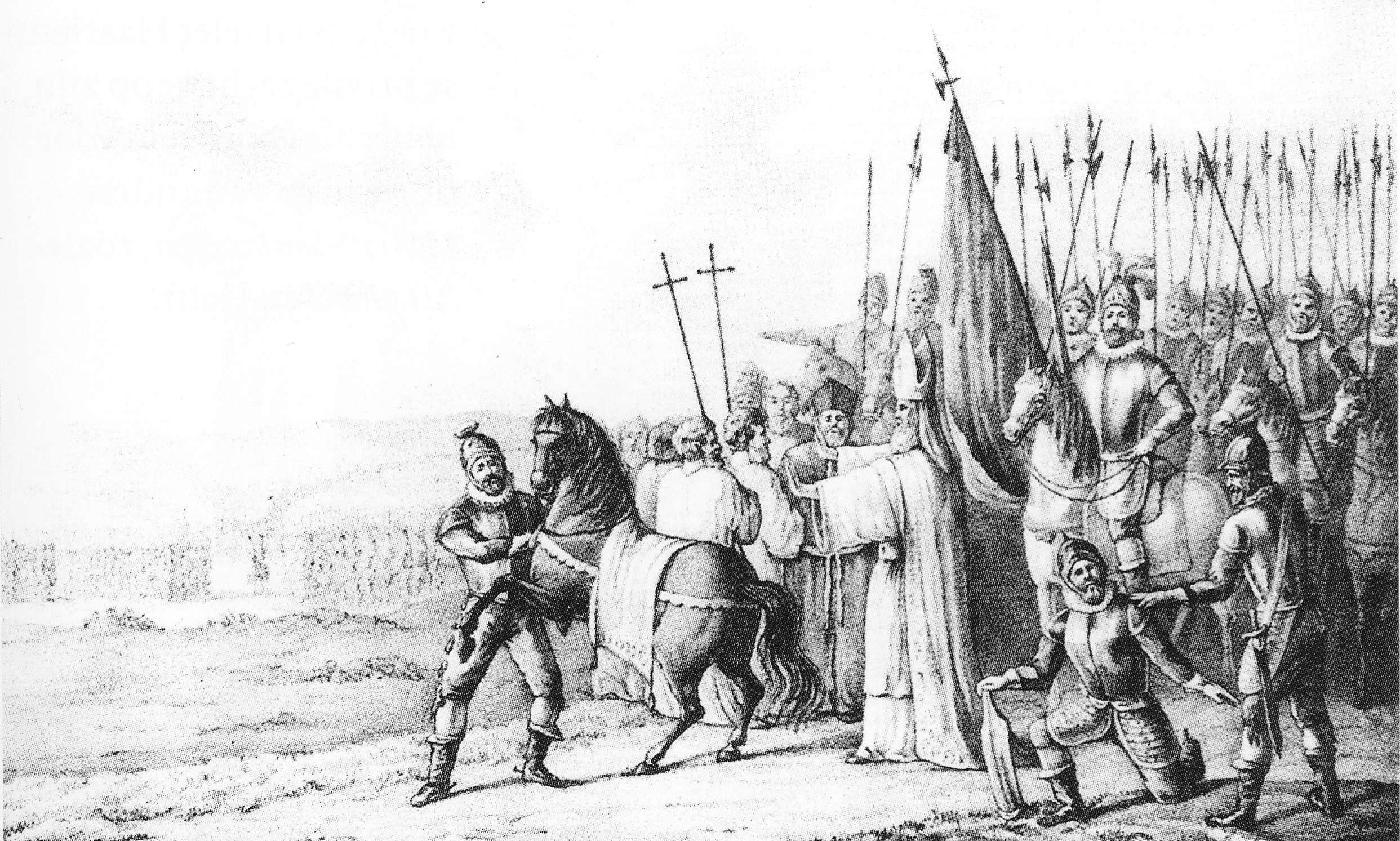
Otto van Lippe

Coevorden was strategically located on the route from Groningen to Münster, making it a prosperous fortified town. Otto van Lippe, the bishop of Utrecht, decided to strengthen its claims over Coevorden, in part to increase income from the region. However, Otto faced a fierce rebellion because the peasants supported their lord, Rudolf II van Coevorden. This resulted in the Battle of Ane, where Otto was killed and the Drenthe peasants under the command of Rudolf II van Coevorden achieved a resounding victory.

After the death of Otto, Wilbrand of Oldenburg was consecrated bishop and he also went to war against Drenthe rebels with the help of Frisians. However, this battle, the Frisian-Drenthe War, was also won by the Drents. In a later battle, at Peize, the Drenthe were ultimately defeated. Rudolf II of Coevorden was lured to Hardenberg Castle where he was captured, tortured, and murdered on 25 July 1230.

=== Return and fall of the Van Coevorden lords ===
In 1288, a grandson of Rudolf returned to power, starting a series of powerful lords of Coevorden, a dynasty that would last until 1402. They controlled the judiciary in Drenthe and their sphere of influence extended to Borculo, Diepenheim, Lage (Germany), and Selwerd.

It wasn't until the end of the 14th century that Bishop Frederik van Utrecht put an end to the unrest by abolishing the hereditary castellany of Coevorden. In 1395, Frederik went to war against the Lord of Drenthe, but unlike at the Battle of Ane, the current lord Reinoud could not count on the support of the peasants because of his own misdeeds. On 4 April 1402, Reinoud renounced all his rights and the Van Coevordens withdrew to their possessions in Twente and the Achterhoek region. Frederik granted Coevorden city rights in 1408.

=== Gelderland control ===
At the beginning of the 16th century, both the chapel of Hulsvoort and the new church in Coevorden were destroyed. The city fell into the hands of Rudolf of Münster in 1518, but in 1522 it was recaptured by the Gelderlanders, under the command of Johan van Selbach. Selbach then governed all eastern areas, including Overijssel and Drenthe, up to the Groningen seacoast.

Selbach would remain castellan of Coevorden and bailiff of Drenthe until 1536, the end of Charles II, Duke of Guelders (Karel van Gelre)'s reign. Selbach was forced to hand over the castle and the fortress to Georg Schenck van Toutenburg, army commander in the region of Emperor Charles V (Karel V).

=== Spanish siege and reconstruction ===
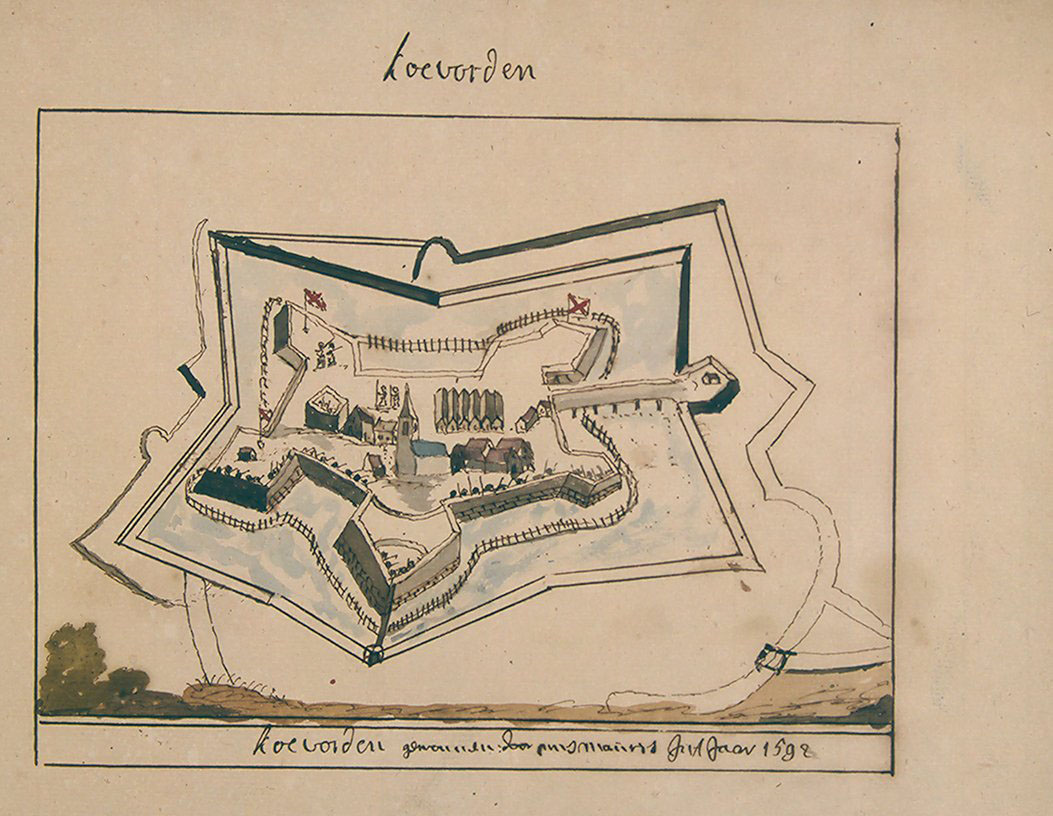
1592

Coevorden was besieged by the Spanish from September 1581 to 1592, led by George de Lalaing, Count of Rennenberg. Coevorden was one of the few fortified cities in the northern provinces that had not participated in Rennenberg's betrayal. The city was captured from the Spanish in 1592 by a Dutch and English force under the command of Maurice, Prince of Orange. The following year it was besieged by a Spanish force but the city held out until its relief in May 1594.

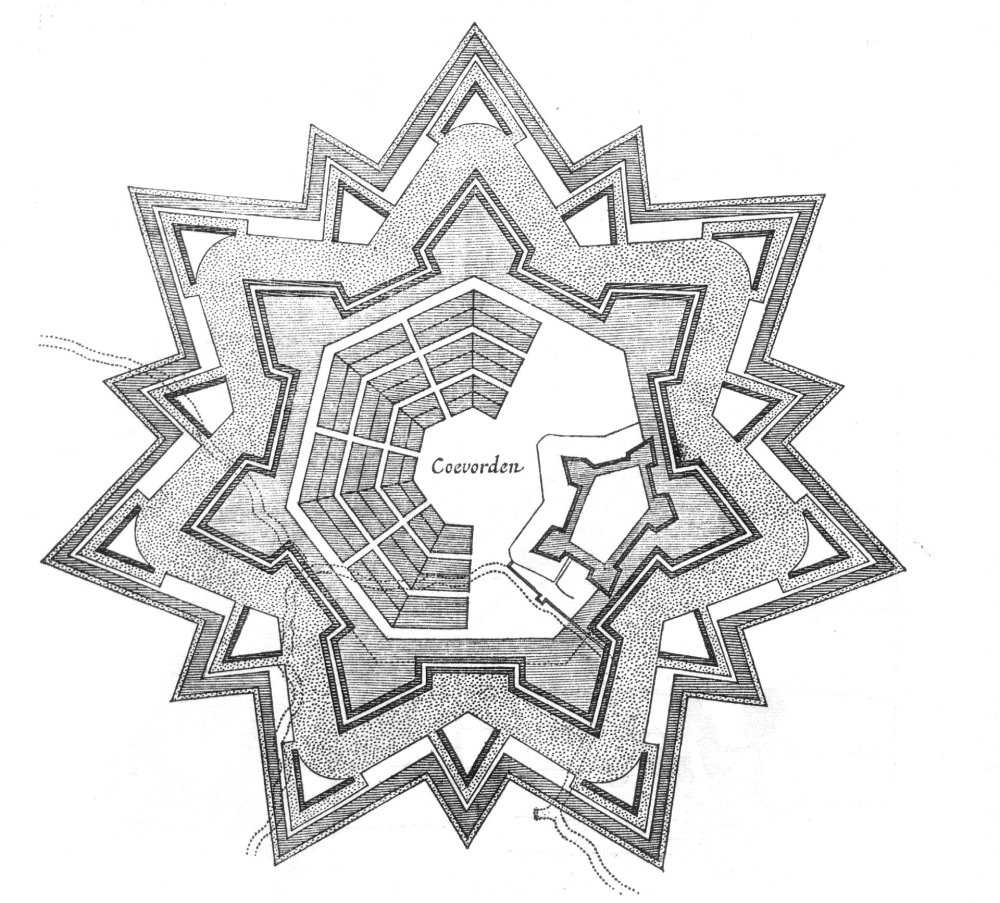
Fortification plan of Coevorden, in Star fort style.

Coevorden had to be completely rebuilt. This started in early 16th century modeled to be an ideal city design, similar to Palmanova. The streets were laid out in a radial pattern within polygonal fortifications and extensive outer earthworks. The fortifications were designed by Menno van Coehoorn.

=== Second Münster siege ===
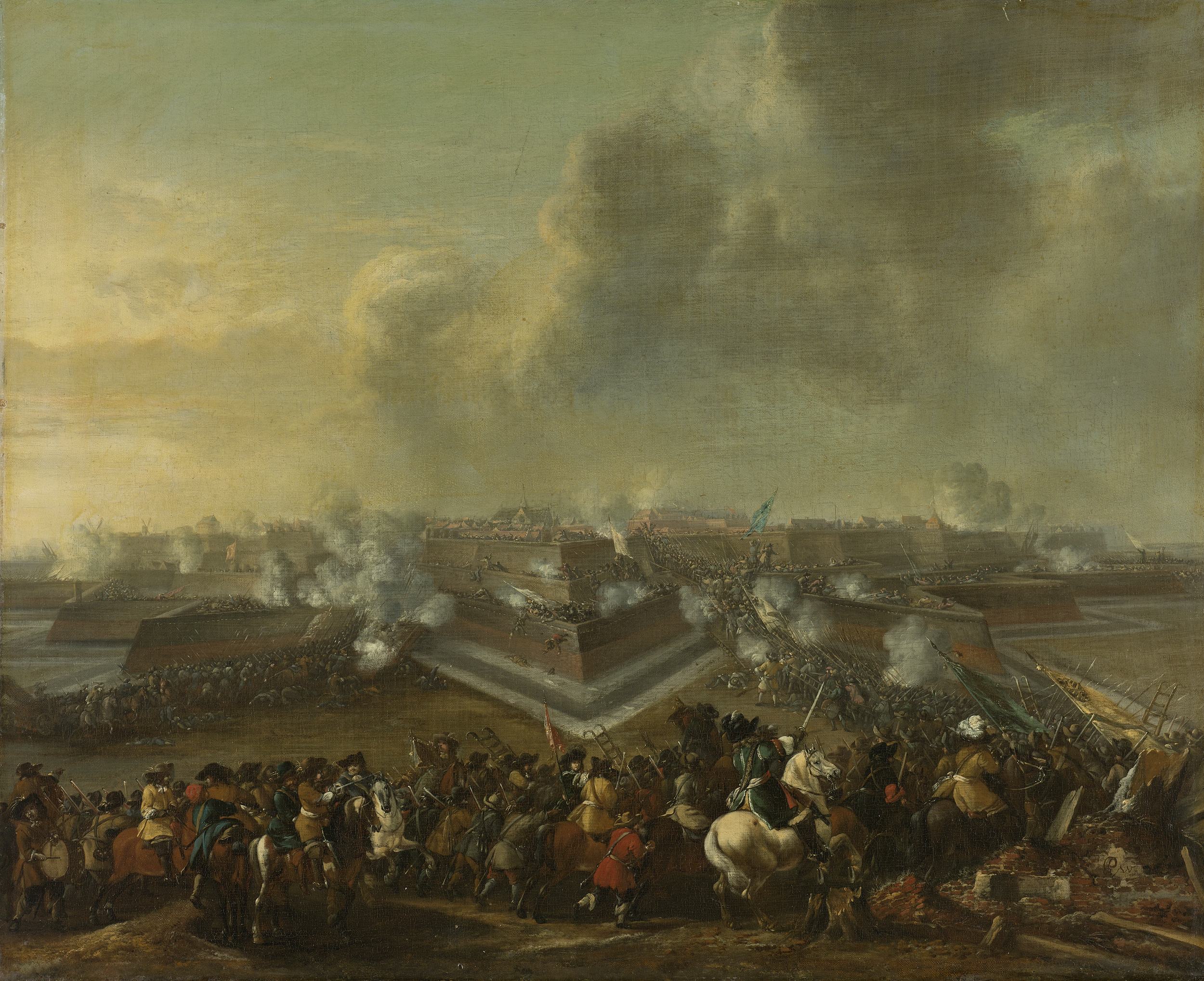
Painting of the (re)capture of Coevorden by Dutch troops commanded by Carl von Rabenhaupt in December 1672, as part of the Franco-Dutch War.

On 30 June 1672, Coevorden was captured by Bernard van Galen, the bishop of Münster. On 30 December 1672, the fortified town was relieved within an hour by Carl von Rabenhaupt. The bishop, however, did not give up, and he besieged Coevorden again in 1673. In early October 1673, the bishop attempted to dam the Vecht River near Gramsbergen and flood Coevorden. However a strong storm and a breach in the dam led to 1,400 Münster soldiers drowning. Coevorden residents were rescued.

In the 18th century, population growth came to a halt. As a relatively large city, Coevorden still held an important regional role, but this was gradually taken over by Emmen.

=== French rule ===
In 1795, Coevorden was captured by the French, and the occupation would last until 1814. The French army was received as a liberating force, had built up sufficient support, and loyalty to the House of Orange was not particularly strong. Berend Slingenberg became secretary of the Revolutionary Committee and was appointed mayor in 1811. After Napoleon's abdication on 3 May 1814, the French left the city in a desolate state.

=== Since World War II ===
Even after the war, Emmen continued to grow into the most important city in the region, and several businesses and institutions relocated from Coevorden to Emmen. It wasn't until the 1980s and 1990s that Coevorden's reputation began to improve, with the arrival of an animal feed company and the construction of a NATO depot, now in use by the Dutch army. With Europark which bean construction in the mid-1990s and is partly located on German territory, Coevorden aims to give new impetus to industry and business in the region.

During the 1998 municipal reorganisation in the province, Coevorden merged with Dalen, Sleen, Oosterhesselen and Zweeloo, retaining its name.

== Geography ==
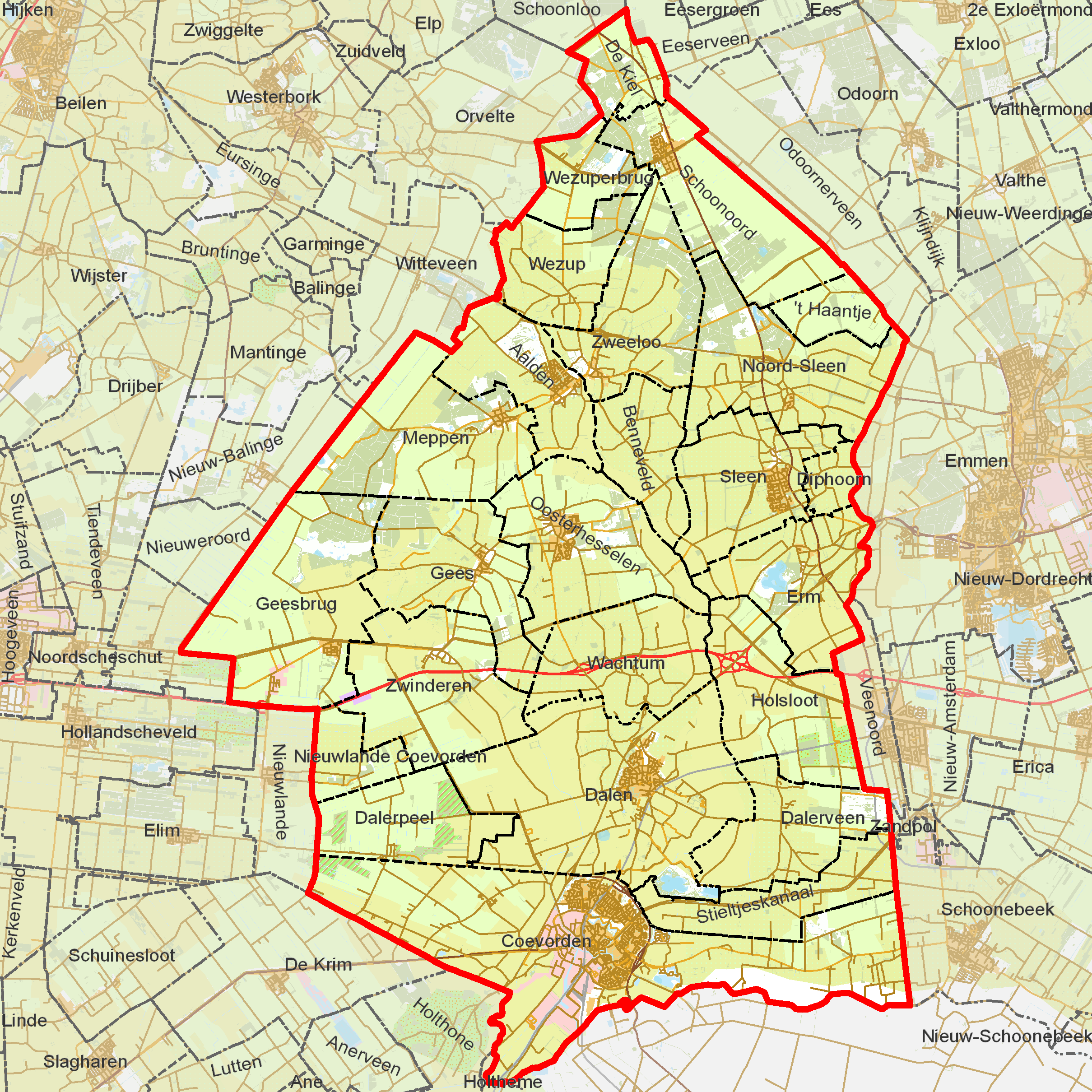
Map of Coevorden municipality

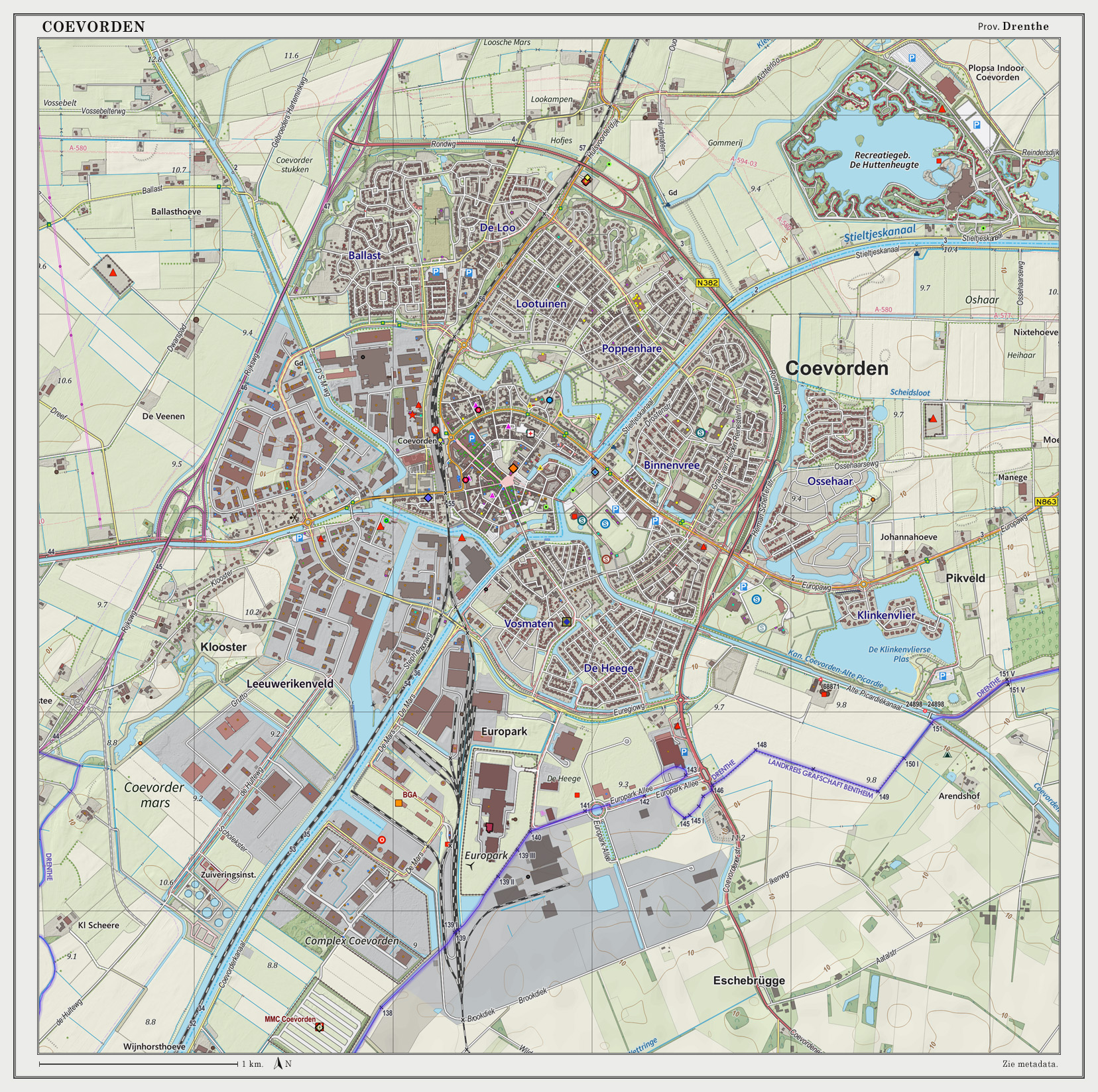
2014 map of the city of Coevorden

Coervorden is located at 52°40′N 6°45′E in the south of the province of Drenthe in the east of the Netherlands.

The population centres in the municipality are:

- Aalden
- Achterste Erm
- Ballast
- Benneveld
- Coevorden
- Dalen
- Dalerpeel
- Dalerveen
- De Kiel
- De Mars
- Den Hool
- Diphoorn
- Eldijk
- Erm
- Gees
- Geesbrug
- Grevenberg
- 't Haantje
- Holsloot
- Hoogehaar
- Kibbelveen
- Klooster
- Langerak
- Meppen
- Nieuwe Krim
- Nieuwlande
- Noord-Sleen
- Oosterhesselen
- Padhuis
- Pikveld
- Schimmelarij
- Schoonoord
- Sleen
- Steenwijksmoer
- Stieltjeskanaal
- Valsteeg
- Veenhuizen
- Vlieghuis
- Vossebelt
- Wachtum
- Weijerswold
- Wezup
- Wezuperbrug
- Zweeloo
- Zwinderen

== Transportation ==
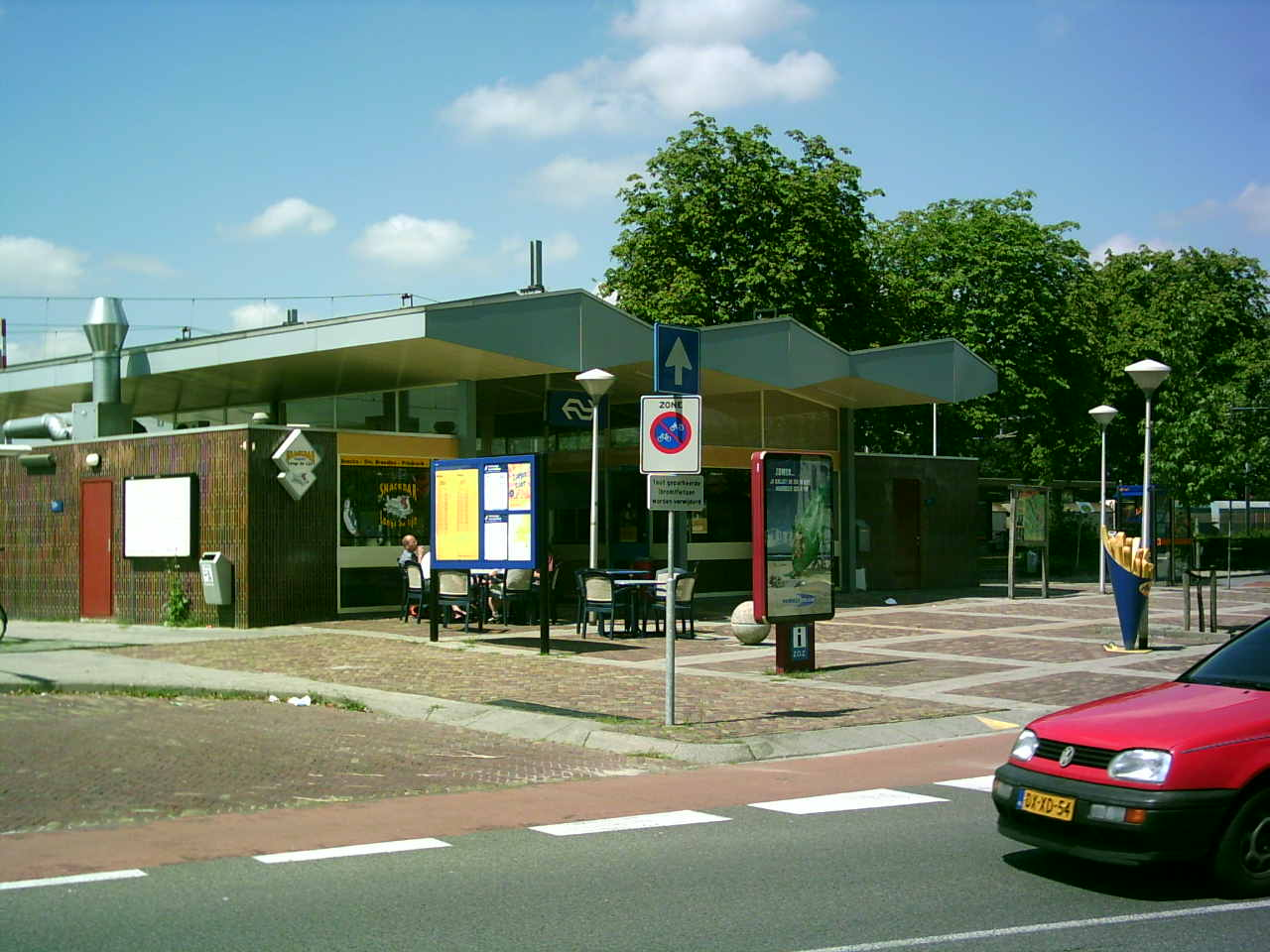
Coevorden train station

There are two railway stations in the municipality Coevorden railway station and Dalen railway station. They are both on the train line Zwolle-Emmen and opened in 1905 (originally it went further to Stadskanaal). In 1910, the railway line between Coevorden and Laarwald in Germany opened, but since 1939 this line has been used exclusively for freight transport. It is planned to open again in 2026. The Nedersaksenlijn is also planned to reconnect Emmen to Stadskanaal.

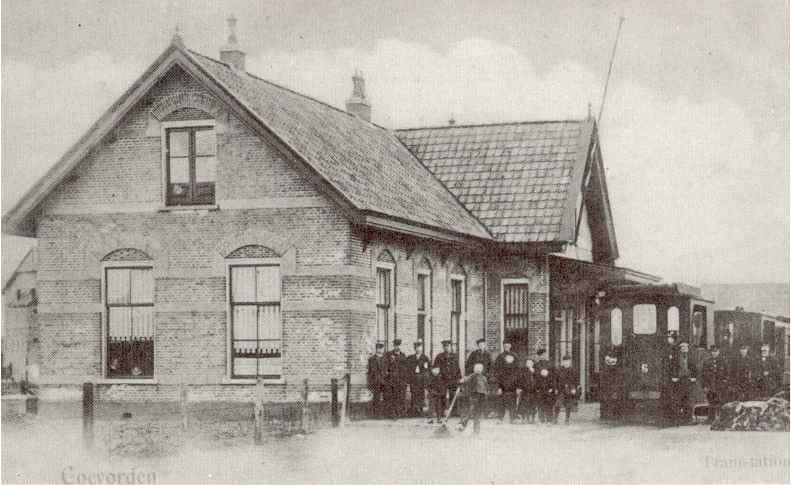
DSM tram station Coevorden in 1906

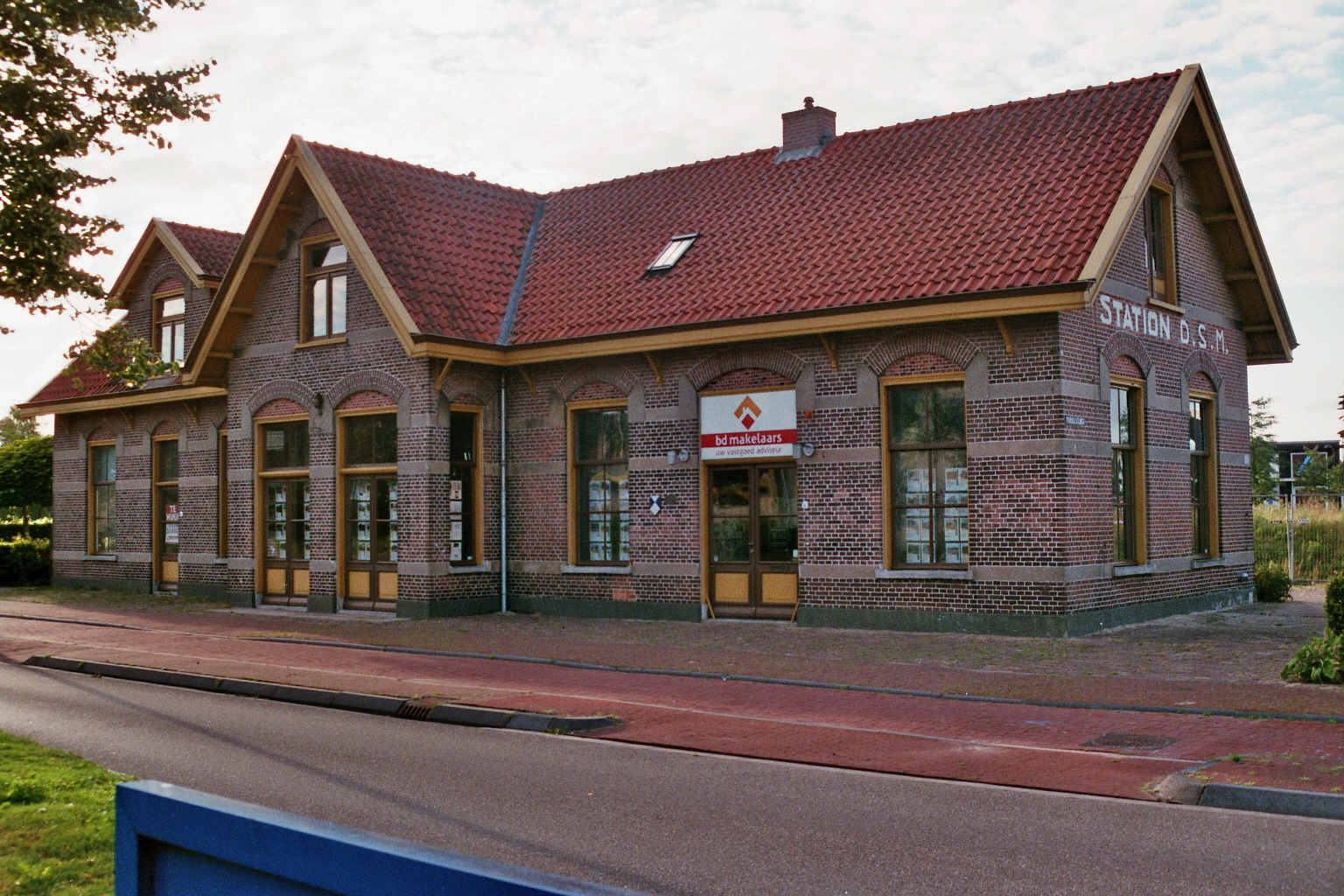
The tram station now

In 1897, Coevorden received its first steam tram connection when the Dedemsvaartsche Stoomtramweg-Maatschappij (DSM) company based in Dedemsvaart opened its station in Coevorden. Later the line extended on the other side towards Ter Apel. Steam tram service was discontinued in 1947. The building still exists today.

== International relations ==
Coevorden is twinned with:

- Nordhorn, Lower Saxony, Germany, since 1963
- Brest, Belarus, since 2011
- Chuhuiv, Kharkiv Oblast, Ukraine, since 2025

== Notable people ==
- Johannes Benedictus van Heutsz (1851-1924). Gouverneur-generaal (1904–09), a Dutch military officer and governor general of the Dutch East Indies in 1904
- Albert Bouwers (1893 in Dalen – 1972) a Dutch optical engineer, worked with X-Rays
- Relus ter Beek (1944 in Coevorden – 2008) a Dutch politician
- Tim de Zeeuw (born 1956 in Sleen) a Dutch astronomer specializing in the galaxies
- Thijs Berman (born 1957 in Coevorden) a former journalist, a Dutch politician and a Member of the European Parliament
- Herman von Hebel (born 1961 in Coevorden) was a Registrar of the International Criminal Court
- Maxim Februari (born 1963 in Coevorden) a Dutch writer, philosopher and columnist
- Joël Voordewind (born 1965 in Sleen) a Dutch politician
- Don Pepijn Schipper (born 1980 in Coevorden) stage name Don Diablo is a Dutch DJ, record producer, musician and songwriter of electronic dance music
- Mark-Jan Fledderus (born 1982 in Coevorden) a Dutch retired footballer with 321 caps

== See also ==
- George Vancouver § Origins of the family name
- Fantasy Gardens, a replica of Coevorden Castle donated to Richmond, British Columbia for the Expo 86

== Gallery ==
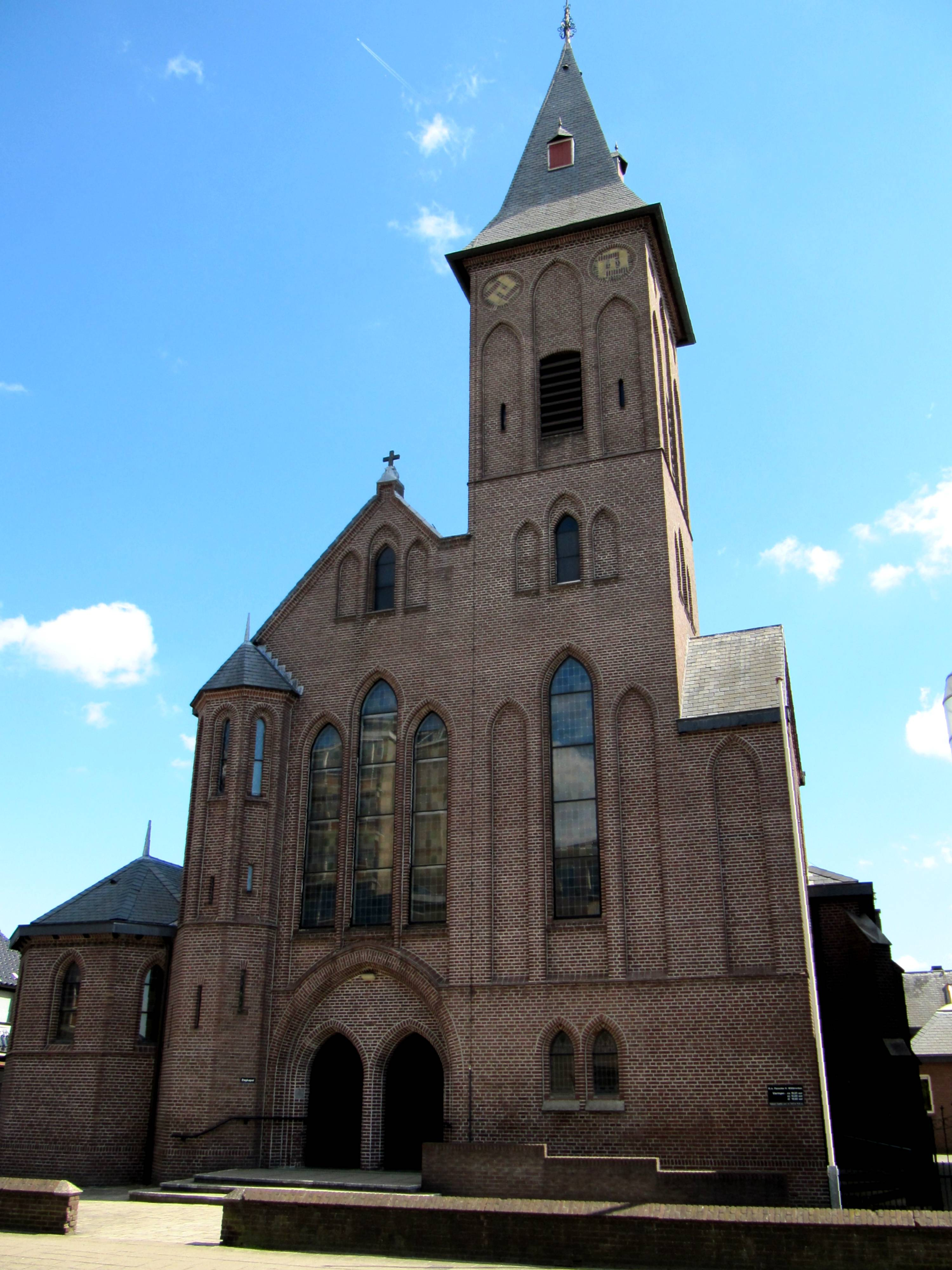
Coevorden Wilhelminastraat, Sint-Willibrordeus church

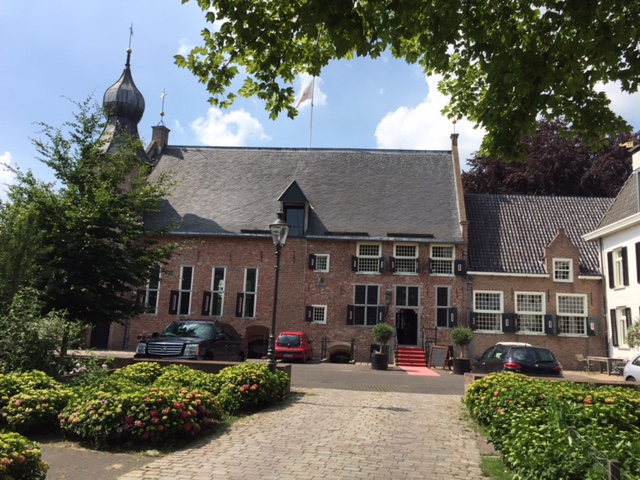
Coevorden Castle

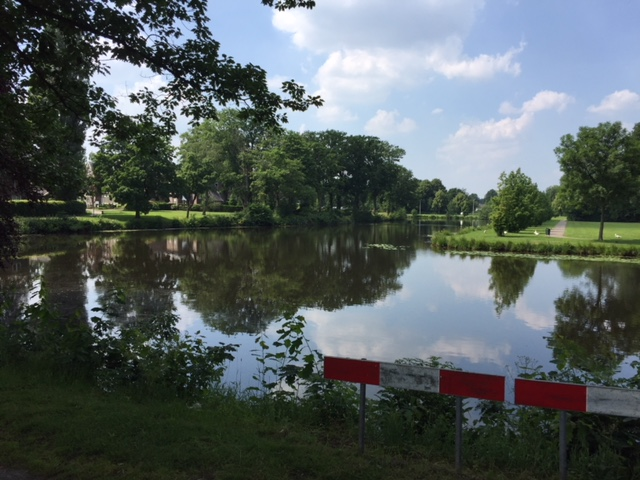
Moat at the Van Heutszpark

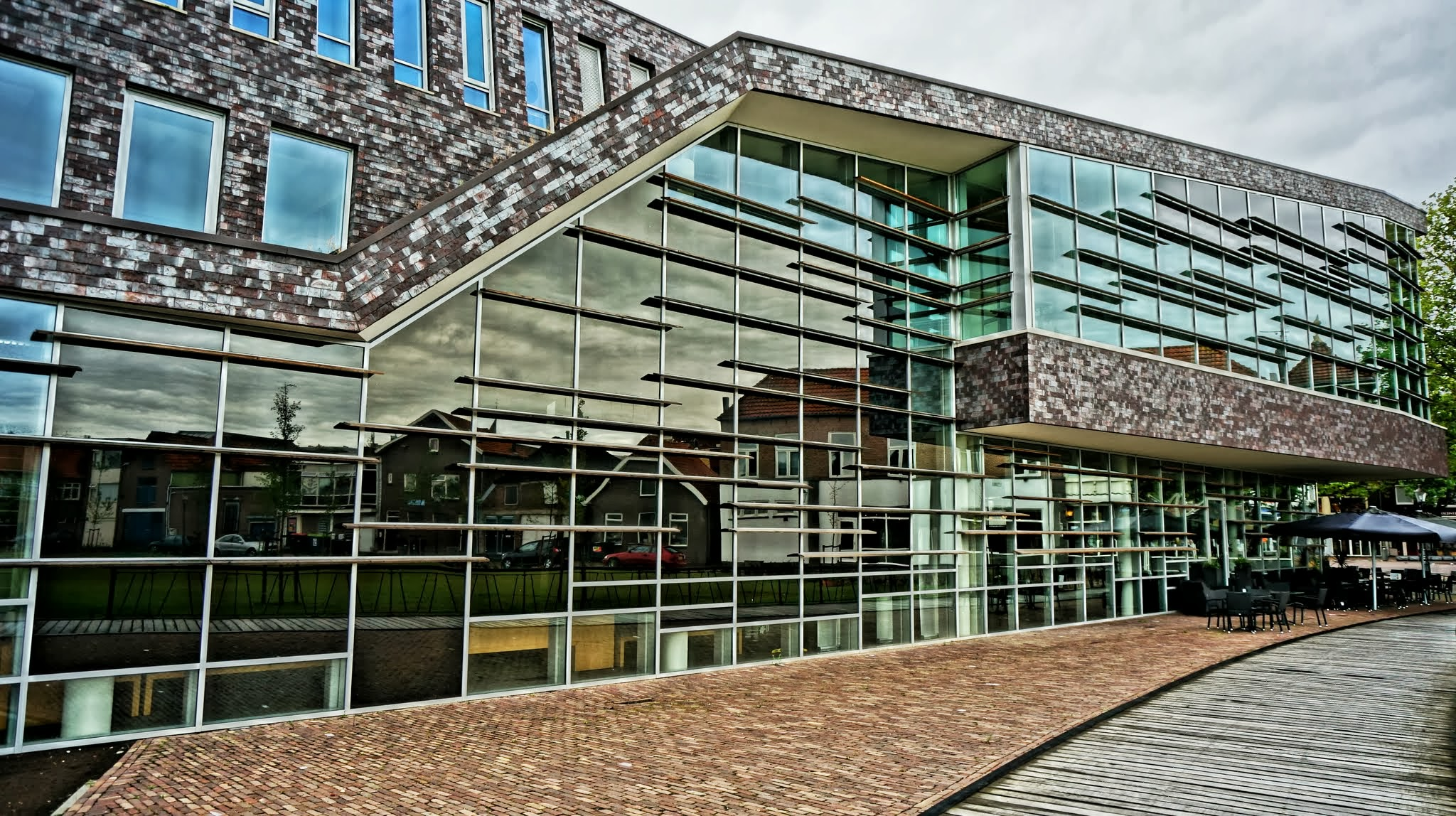
Coevorden city hall
