= Klooster, Drenthe =

Klooster
- Hamlet
- Location within Drenthe Location within Netherlands
- Coordinates: 52°39′20″N 6°43′2″E
- Country: Netherlands
- Province: Drenthe
- Municipality: Coevorden

Area
  - Total: 0.91 km^{2} (0.35 sq mi)
- Elevation: 11 m (36 ft)

Population (2021)
  - Total: 160
  - Density: 180/km^{2} (460/sq mi)
- Time zone: UTC+1 (CET)
  - Summer (DST): UTC+2 (CEST)
- Postal code: 7741
- Dialing code: 0591

Klooster is a hamlet in the Netherlands and is part of the Coevorden municipality in Drenthe.

Klooster is a statistical entity, however the postal authorities have placed it under Coevorden. It was first mentioned in 1328 as "een huys geheiten ten Cloester by Coevorden", and refers to the monastery Maria in Campis which was closed in the area until 1259 when they moved to Assen. In 1840, it was home to 85 people.
