= Meppen, Coevorden =

Meppen
- Village
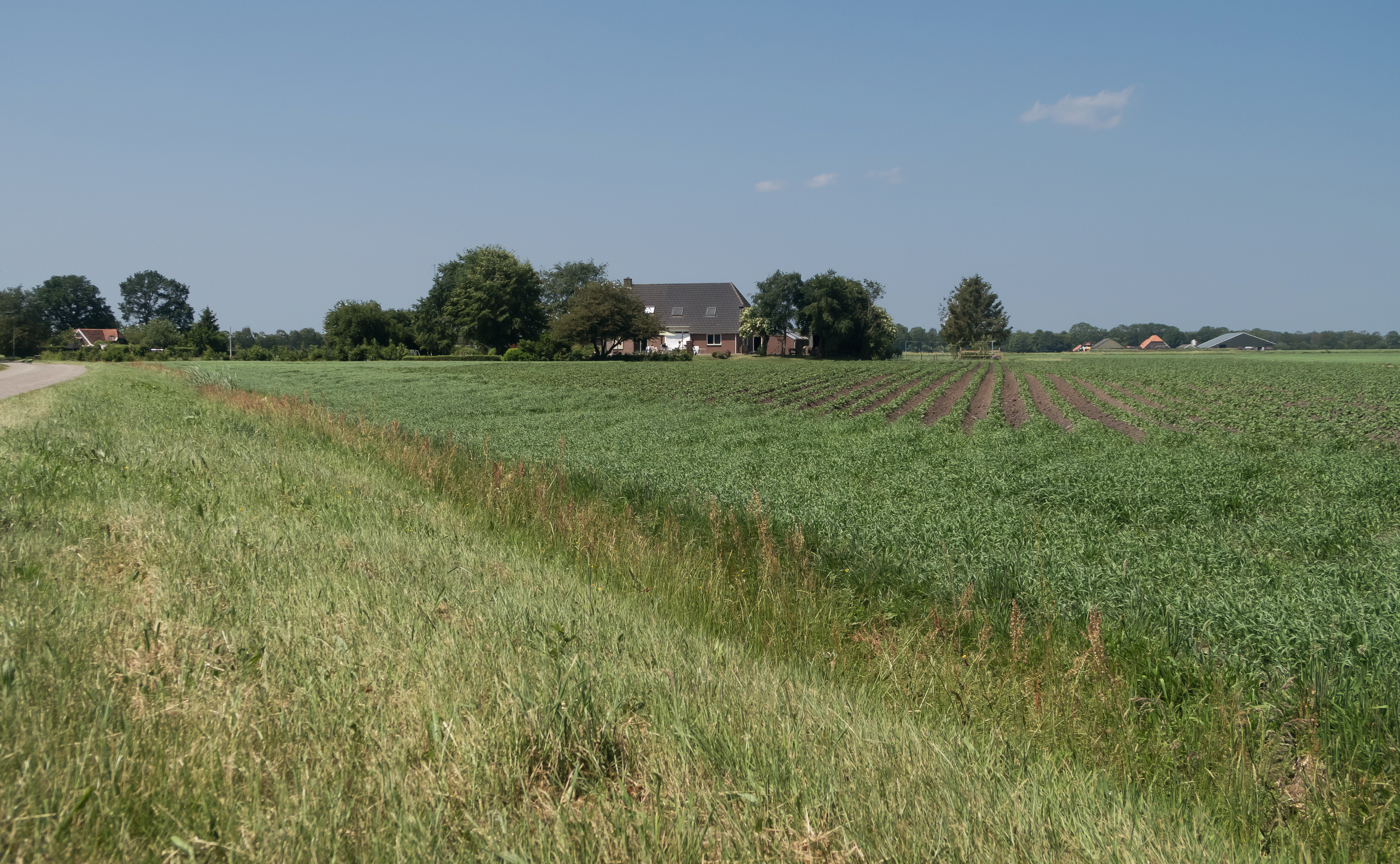
- Farm in Meppen

- Location within Drenthe Location within Netherlands
- Coordinates: 52°46′53″N 6°41′44″E
- Country: Netherlands
- Province: Drenthe
- Municipality: Coevorden

Area
  - Total: 16.73 km^{2} (6.46 sq mi)
- Elevation: 17 m (56 ft)

Population (2021)
  - Total: 385
  - Density: 23.0/km^{2} (59.6/sq mi)
- Time zone: UTC+1 (CET)
  - Summer (DST): UTC+2 (CEST)
- Postal code: 7855
- Dialing code: 0591

Meppen is a village in the Netherlands and is part of the Coevorden municipality in Drenthe.

Meppen was first mentioned around 1335. The etymology is unknown. The German city of Meppen is about 30 km east of the Dutch village. Traces of an esdorp dating from 5,000 BC have been discovered near the hamlet. In 1840, it was home to 238 people.
