= Vossebelt =

- Hamlet
- Location within Drenthe Location within Netherlands
- Coordinates: 52.68045°N 6.70046°E
- Country: Netherlands
- Province: Drenthe
- Municipality: Coevorden
- Elevation: 13 m (43 ft)
- Time zone: UTC+1 (CET)
  - Summer (DST): UTC+2 (CEST)
- Postal code: 7751
- Dialing code: 0524

Vossebelt is a hamlet in the Netherlands and it is part of the Coevorden municipality in Drenthe.

Vossebelt is not a statistical entity, and the postal authorities have placed it under Dalen. It was first mentioned between 1830 and 1855 as De Vossebelt, and means "the fox height". In 1840, it was home to 65 people. Nowadays, it has about 30 houses.
