= Eldijk =

- Hamlet
- Location within Drenthe Location within Netherlands
- Coordinates: 52°43′3″N 6°46′35″E
- Country: Netherlands
- Province: Drenthe
- Municipality: Coevorden
- Elevation: 13 m (43 ft)
- Time zone: UTC+1 (CET)
  - Summer (DST): UTC+2 (CEST)
- Postal code: 7751
- Dialing code: 0524

Eldijk is a hamlet in the Netherlands and is part of the Coevorden municipality in Drenthe.

Eldijk is not a statistical entity, and the postal authorities have placed it under Dalen. It was first mentioned in the 1850s as de Eltdijk, and means "the dike of De Elten". Eldijk consists of about 10 houses.
