= Pikveld =

- Hamlet and neighbourhood
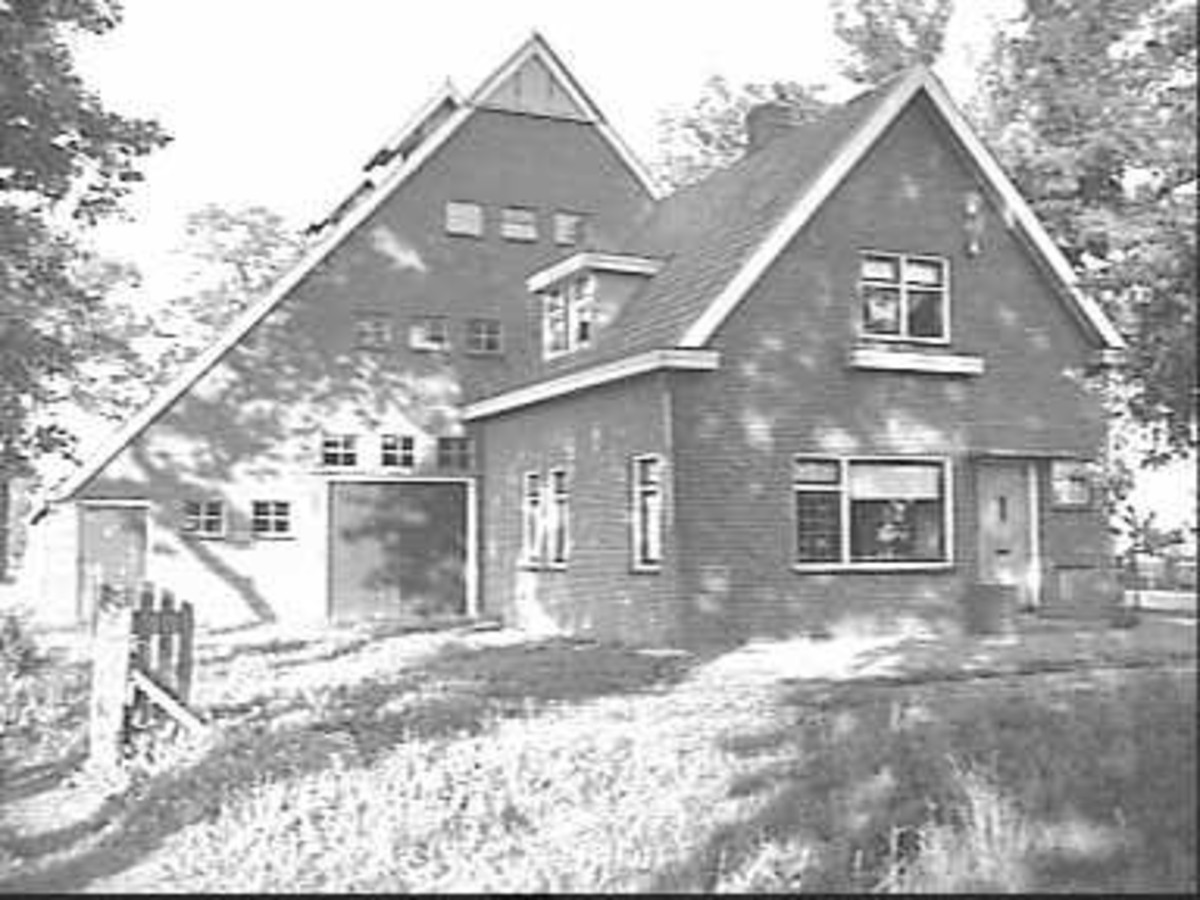
- Farm in Pikveld

- Location within Drenthe Location within Netherlands
- Coordinates: 52°39′25″N 6°46′11″E
- Country: Netherlands
- Province: Drenthe
- Municipality: Coevorden

Area
  - Total: 1.02 km^{2} (0.39 sq mi)
- Elevation: 10 m (33 ft)

Population (2021)
  - Total: 3,060
  - Density: 3,000/km^{2} (7,770/sq mi)
- Time zone: UTC+1 (CET)
  - Summer (DST): UTC+2 (CEST)
- Postal code: 7742
- Dialing code: 0524

Pikveld is a neighbourhood of Coevorden and a hamlet in the province of Drenthe in the Netherlands.

Pikveld was first mentioned in 1600 as Leenert ten Pickvelt, and means "pitch field". In 1840, it was home to 18 people. Nowadays there are about 20 houses in the hamlet. It is also the name of the nearby neighbourhood of Coevorden which is significantly larger.
