= Geesbrug =

- Village
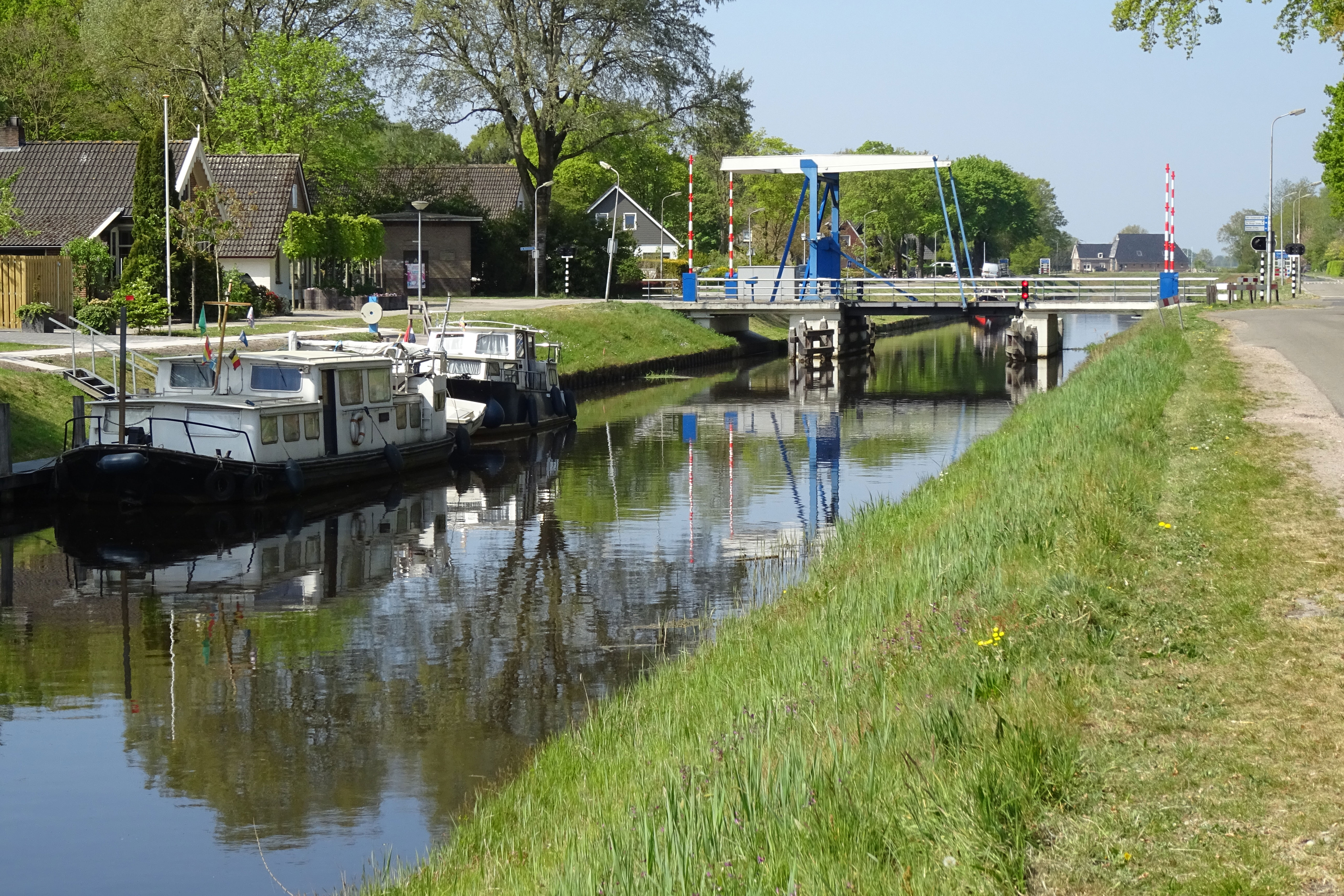
- Bridge at Geesbrug

- Location within Drenthe Location within Netherlands
- Coordinates: 52°43′40″N 6°38′2″E
- Country: Netherlands
- Province: Drenthe
- Municipality: Coevorden

Area
  - Total: 19.01 km^{2} (7.34 sq mi)
- Elevation: 15 m (49 ft)

Population (2021)
  - Total: 1,355
  - Density: 71.28/km^{2} (184.6/sq mi)
- Time zone: UTC+1 (CET)
  - Summer (DST): UTC+2 (CEST)
- Postal code: 7917
- Dialing code: 0524

Geesbrug is a village in the Netherlands and is part of the Coevorden municipality in Drenthe.

Geesburg was first mentioned in 1913, and means the bridge near Gees.

== Work Camp Geesburg ==
Work Camp Geesburg was built in the 1930s for the unemployed. In 1942, it was used as a Jewish forced labour camp to cultivate the land. They were later moved to Westerbork transit camp.

In 1949, Indonesia became independent, and the Royal Netherlands East Indies Army was disbanded. The islands of Ambon, Buru, and Seram had fought on side of the Netherlands, and proclaimed the Republic of South Maluku which resulted in an attack by Indonesia. In 1951, 12,000 refugees from South Maluku were temporarily resettled in the Netherlands. A group of refugees was resettled in Camp Geesbrug. The camp is nowadays in use as a pig farm.
