= Valsteeg =

- Hamlet
- Location within Drenthe Location within Netherlands
- Coordinates: 52°42.5′N 6°44.6′E
- Country: Netherlands
- Province: Drenthe
- Municipality: Coevorden
- Elevation: 13 m (43 ft)
- Time zone: UTC+1 (CET)
  - Summer (DST): UTC+2 (CEST)
- Postal code: 7751
- Dialing code: 0524

Valsteeg is a hamlet in the Netherlands and is part of the Coevorden municipality in Drenthe.

Valsteeg is not a statistical entity, and the postal authority have placed it under Dalen. It was first mentioned in 1650 as Valste, and means "settlement on a slope". It consists of a handful of houses.
