= Steenwijksmoer =

- Village
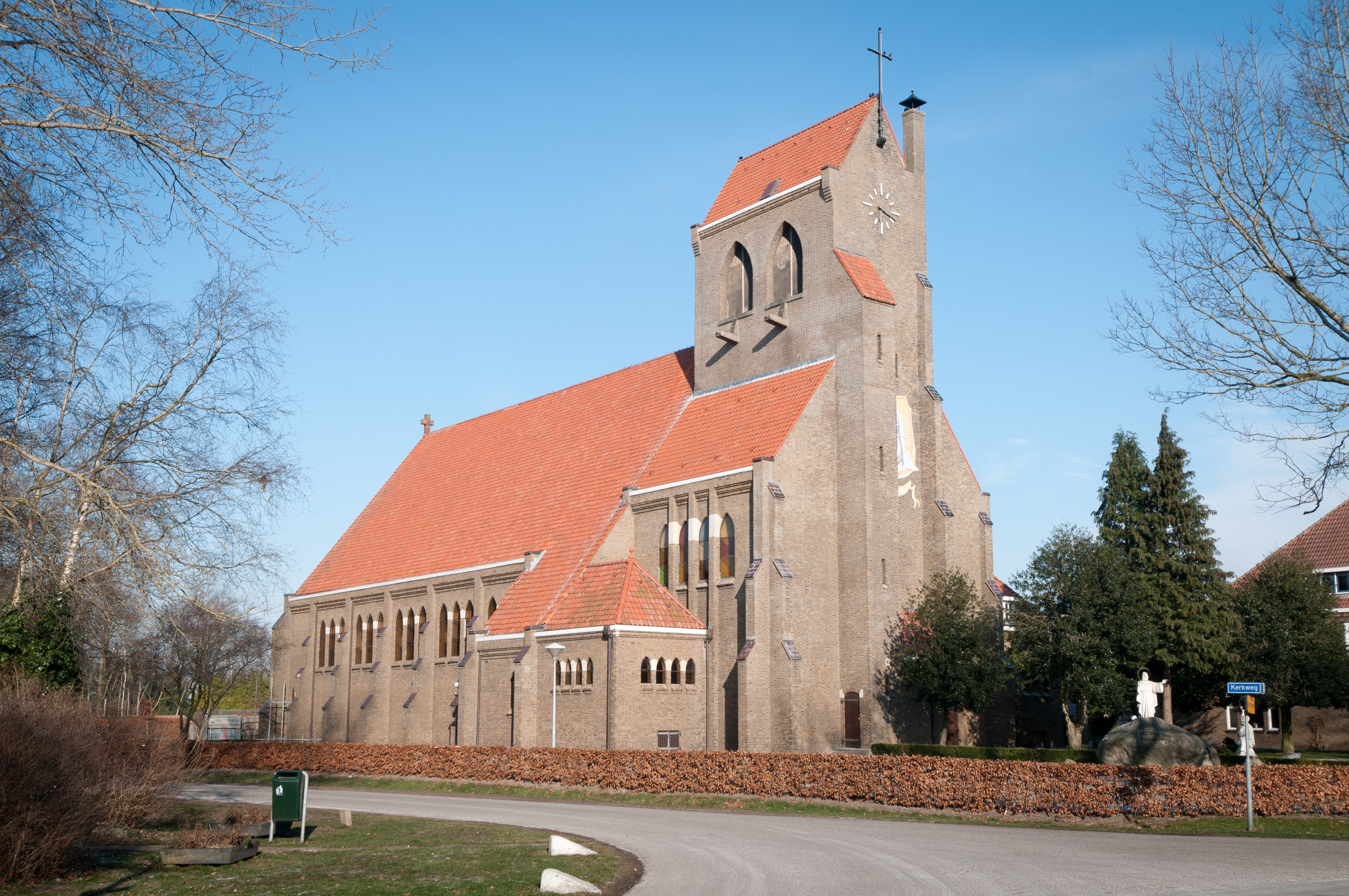
- Church in Steenwijksmoer

- Location within Drenthe Location within Netherlands
- Coordinates: 52°40′11″N 6°41′53″E
- Country: Netherlands
- Province: Drenthe
- Municipality: Coevorden

Area
  - Total: 9.84 km^{2} (3.80 sq mi)
- Elevation: 11 m (36 ft)

Population (2021)
  - Total: 910
  - Density: 92/km^{2} (240/sq mi)
- Time zone: UTC+1 (CET)
  - Summer (DST): UTC+2 (CEST)
- Postal code: 7741
- Dialing code: 0524

Steenwijksmoer is a village in the Netherlands and it is part of the Coevorden municipality in Drenthe.

It was first mentioned in 1845 as Steenwijks-Moer, and means "the moorland of de Vos family who came from Steenwijk". In 1840, it was home to 252 people.
