= Hoogehaar =

- Hamlet
- Location within Drenthe Location within Netherlands
- Coordinates: 52.68086°N 6.71604°E
- Country: Netherlands
- Province: Drenthe
- Municipality: Coevorden
- Elevation: 13 m (43 ft)
- Time zone: UTC+1 (CET)
  - Summer (DST): UTC+2 (CEST)
- Postal code: 7751
- Dialing code: 0524

Hoogehaar is a hamlet in the Netherlands and is part of the Coevorden municipality in Drenthe.

Hoogehaar is not a statistical entity, and the postal authorities have placed it under Dalen. It was first mentioned in the 1850s as De Hooge Haar, and means "sandy ridge". The hamlet consists of about 10 houses.
