= Zwinderen =

- Village
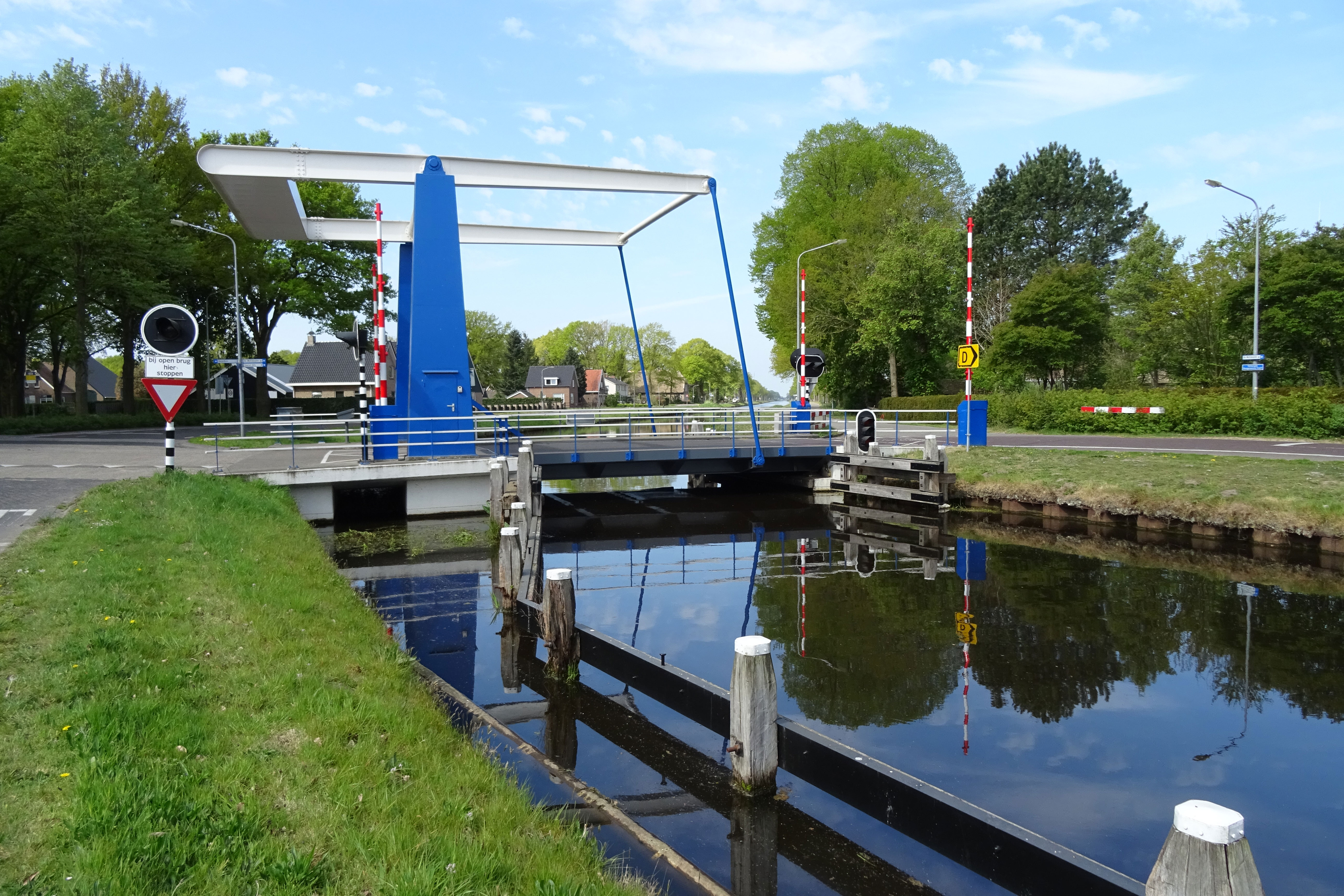
- Bridge at Zwinderen

- Location within Drenthe Location within Netherlands
- Coordinates: 52°43′37″N 6°40′34″E
- Country: Netherlands
- Province: Drenthe
- Municipality: Coevorden

Area
  - Total: 14.40 km^{2} (5.56 sq mi)
- Elevation: 13 m (43 ft)

Population (2021)
  - Total: 410
  - Density: 28/km^{2} (74/sq mi)
- Time zone: UTC+1 (CET)
  - Summer (DST): UTC+2 (CEST)
- Postal code: 7864
- Dialing code: 0524

Zwinderen is a village in the Netherlands and it is part of the Coevorden municipality in Drenthe, about 8.7 km from the city Coevorden.

Zwinderen is an esdorp without a church which developed in the early Middle Ages. It was first mentioned in 1217 as "in Suinre". The etymology is unclear. In 1840, it was home to 134 people.
