= De Kiel =

- Village
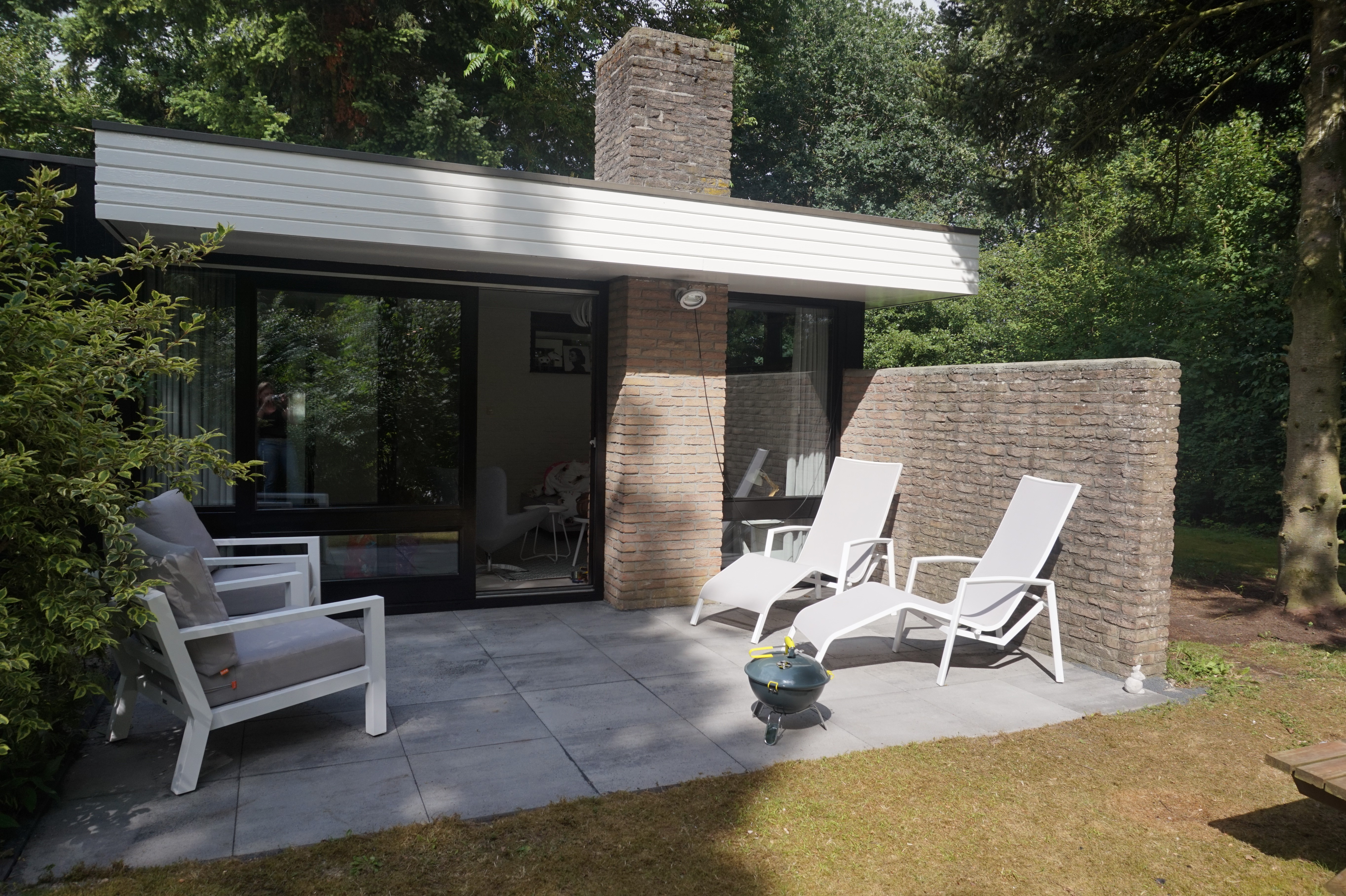
- Holiday house in De Kiel

- Location within Drenthe Location within Netherlands
- Coordinates: 52°51′44″N 6°44′46″E
- Country: Netherlands
- Province: Drenthe
- Municipality: Coevorden

Area
  - Total: 4.08 km^{2} (1.58 sq mi)
- Elevation: 21 m (69 ft)

Population (2021)
  - Total: 380
  - Density: 93/km^{2} (240/sq mi)
- Time zone: UTC+1 (CET)
  - Summer (DST): UTC+2 (CEST)
- Postal code: 7849
- Dialing code: 0591

De Kiel is a village in the Netherlands and is part of the Coevorden municipality in Drenthe.

De Kiel was first mentioned in 1899 as Kiel and means "the deeper part of a ditch". It used to be spread over six municipalities, and before that seven marken. In 1942, the borders were corrected.

== See also ==
- Coevorden
