= Ballast, Coevorden =

Ballast
- Hamlet and neighbourhood
- Location in the Netherlands Ballast (Netherlands)
- Coordinates: 52.6743°N 6.7178°E
- Country: Netherlands
- Province: Drenthe
- Municipality: Coevorden

Area
  - Total: 0.62 km^{2} (0.24 sq mi)
- Elevation: 11 m (36 ft)

Population (2021)
  - Total: 1,595
  - Density: 2,600/km^{2} (6,700/sq mi)
- Time zone: UTC+1 (CET)
  - Summer (DST): UTC+2 (CEST)
- Postal code: 7741
- Dialing code: 0524

Ballast is a hamlet and neighbourhood of Coevorden in Drenthe, Netherlands.

The hamlet part is not marked. The population is 1840 was 49. Nowadays, it contains about 20 houses. The neighbourhood of Coevorden next to village is also named Ballast, and is significantly larger.
