= Benneveld =

- Village
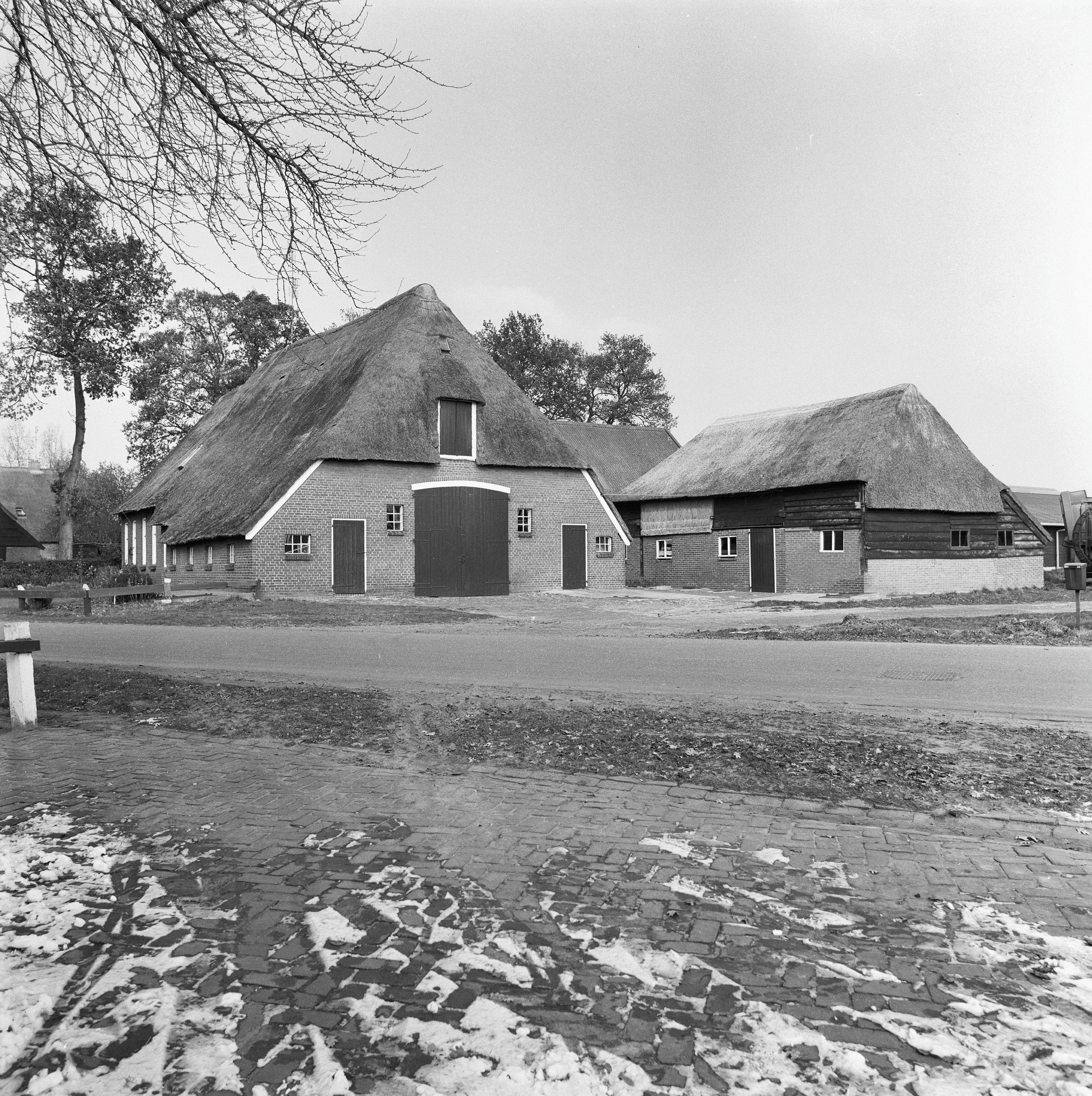
- Farm in Benneveld

- Location in the Netherlands Benneveld (Netherlands)
- Coordinates: 52°46′N 6°45′E
- Country: Netherlands
- Province: Drenthe
- Municipality: Coevorden

Area
  - Total: 7.02 km^{2} (2.71 sq mi)
- Elevation: 16 m (52 ft)

Population (2021)
  - Total: 180
  - Density: 26/km^{2} (66/sq mi)
- Time zone: UTC+1 (CET)
  - Summer (DST): UTC+2 (CEST)
- Postal code: 7856
- Dialing code: 0591

Benneveld is a village in the Netherlands and it is part of the Coevorden municipality in Drenthe.

Benneveld was first mentioned around 1270 as Bonavelda. The etymology is not clear. It used to be a boermarke, all land was both private and communal, and the farmers were autonomous. In 1840, it was home to 158 people.
