= Weijerswold =

- Hamlet
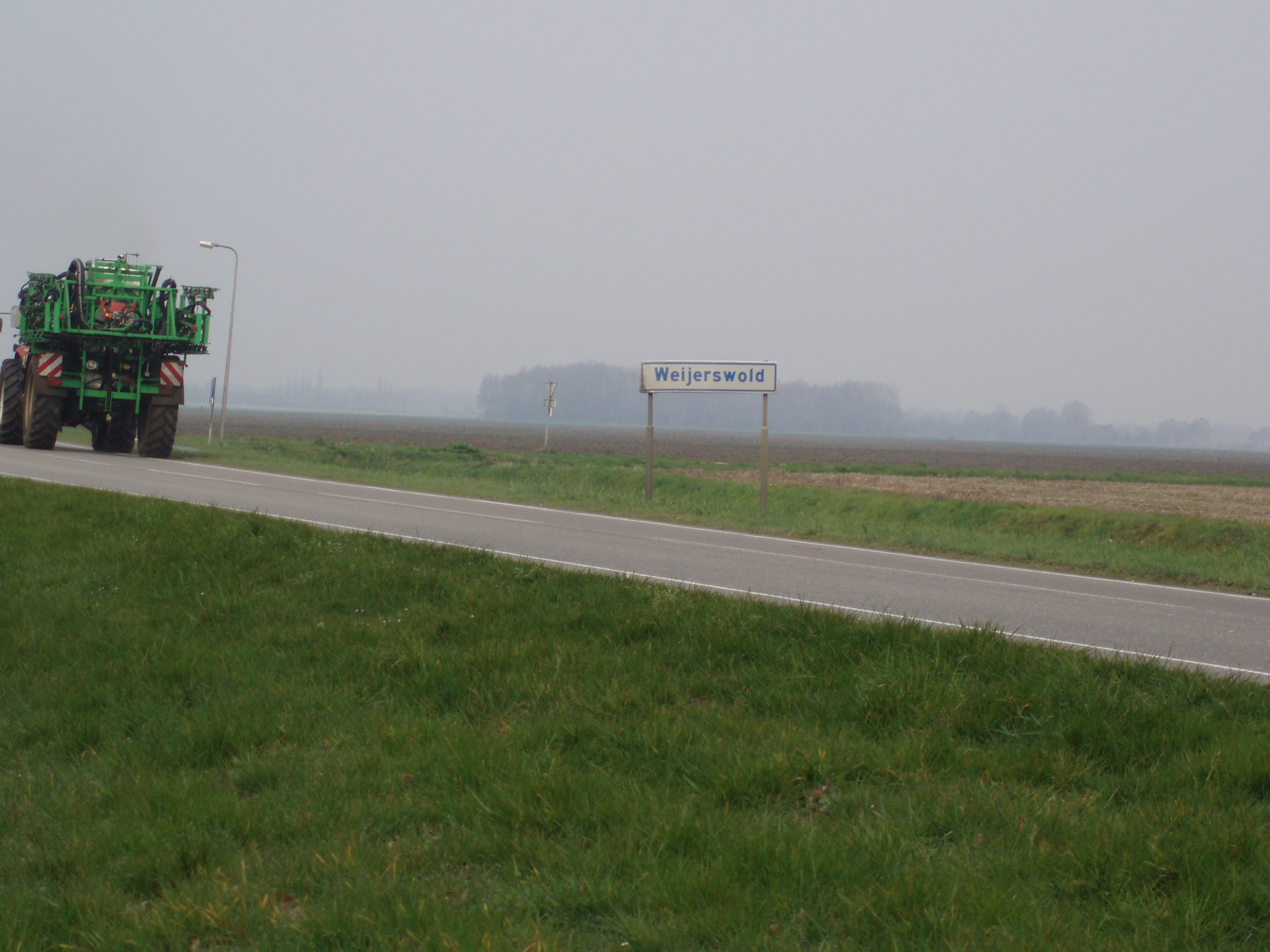
- Entering Weijerswold

- Location within Drenthe Location within Netherlands
- Coordinates: 52°39′41″N 6°47′24″E
- Country: Netherlands
- Province: Drenthe
- Municipality: Coevorden

Area
  - Total: 3.64 km^{2} (1.41 sq mi)
- Elevation: 10 m (33 ft)

Population (2021)
  - Total: 80
  - Density: 22/km^{2} (57/sq mi)
- Time zone: UTC+1 (CET)
  - Summer (DST): UTC+2 (CEST)
- Postal code: 7742
- Dialing code: 0524

Weijerswold is a hamlet in the Netherlands and is part of the Coevorden municipality in Drenthe, east of the city of Coevorden.

Weijerswold is a road village on a sandy hill dating for the Middle Ages. It was first mentioned in 1520 as "beneden den graven die van Wijerdeswolde daele gaet nae den Hennenbroke", and means "swamp forest belonging to Wijerd". In 1840, it was home to 42 people.
