= Dalerveen =

- Village
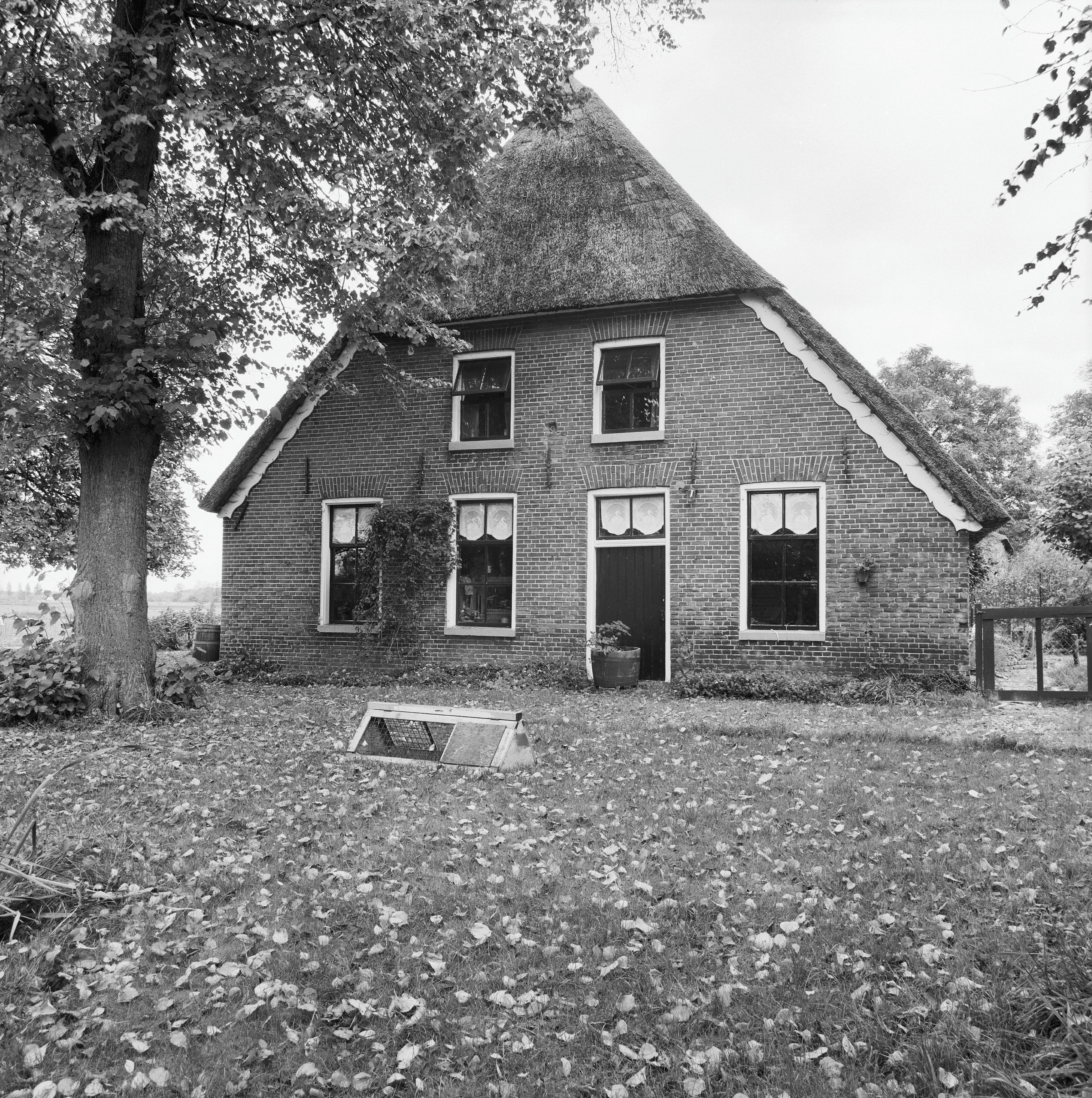
- Farm in Dalerveen

- Location within Drenthe Location within Netherlands
- Coordinates: 52°41′57″N 6°48′28″E
- Country: Netherlands
- Province: Drenthe
- Municipality: Coevorden

Area
  - Total: 10.69 km^{2} (4.13 sq mi)
- Elevation: 13 m (43 ft)

Population (2021)
  - Total: 355
  - Density: 33.2/km^{2} (86.0/sq mi)
- Time zone: UTC+1 (CET)
  - Summer (DST): UTC+2 (CEST)
- Postal code: 7755
- Dialing code: 0524

Dalerveen is a village in the Netherlands and it is part of the Coevorden municipality in Drenthe.

Dalerveen started during the peat excavation from Dalen. There were originally two villages: De Haar and Dalerveen. It was first mentioned in 1597 as "uth Daler venne" and means "the bog near Dalen". In 1840, it was home to 275 people. In the 1940, De Haar and Dalerveen merged into a single village.
