= Wachtum =

- Village
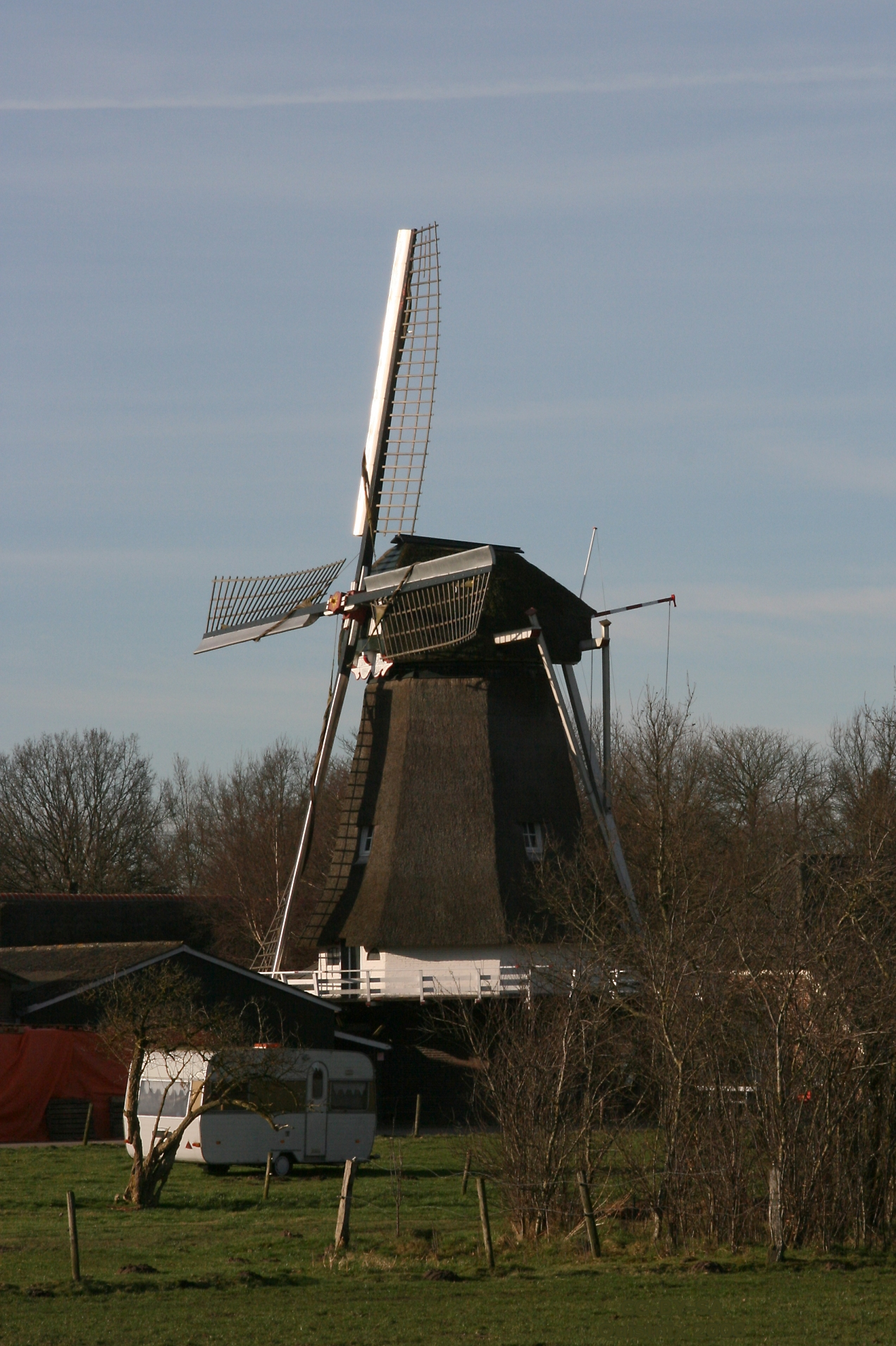
- Windmill De Hoop

- Location within Drenthe Location within Netherlands
- Coordinates: 52°43′27″N 6°45′1″E
- Country: Netherlands
- Province: Drenthe
- Municipality: Coevorden

Area
  - Total: 12.27 km^{2} (4.74 sq mi)
- Elevation: 13 m (43 ft)

Population (2021)
  - Total: 384
  - Density: 31.3/km^{2} (81.1/sq mi)
- Time zone: UTC+1 (CET)
  - Summer (DST): UTC+2 (CEST)
- Postal code: 7754
- Dialing code: 0524

Wachtum is a village located in the municipality of Coevorden, within the Dutch province of Drenthe.

== History ==
The village was first mentioned between 1381 and 1383 "to Wachtman". The etymology is unknown. Wachtum is an esdorp without a church which developed in the Early Middle Ages on a sandy ridge.

The village is home to a windmill, which its villagers refer to as De Hoop. Originally, it was built as a drainage mill for a polder in Veendam, Groningen. In 1894 it was moved to Wachtum where the villagers began utilizing it to produce animal feed.

Wachtum was home to 338 people in 1840.
