= Holsloot =

- Village
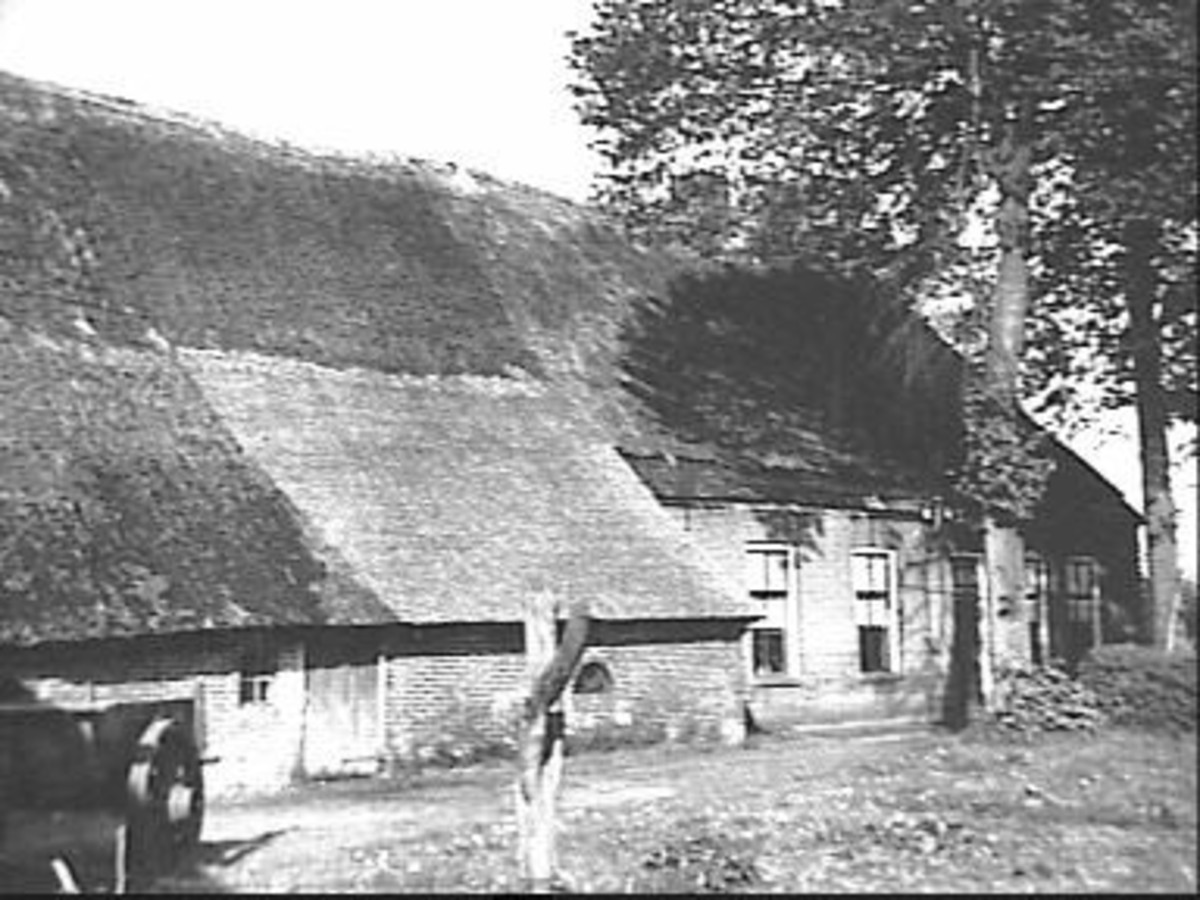
- Farm in Holsloot

- Location within Drenthe Location within Netherlands
- Coordinates: 52°43′41″N 6°48′8″E
- Country: Netherlands
- Province: Drenthe
- Municipality: Coevorden

Area
  - Total: 8.19 km^{2} (3.16 sq mi)
- Elevation: 14 m (46 ft)

Population (2021)
  - Total: 215
  - Density: 26.3/km^{2} (68.0/sq mi)
- Time zone: UTC+1 (CET)
  - Summer (DST): UTC+2 (CEST)
- Postal code: 7845
- Dialing code: 0591

Holsloot is a village in the Netherlands and is part of the Coevorden municipality in Drenthe.

Holsloot was first mentioned in 12BC, and means "hollow ditch". The village developed after the Verlengde Hoogeveensche Vaart was dug, and is a linear settlement. The pub near the bridge became the centre of the village.
