= 't Haantje, Drenthe =

't Haantje
- Village
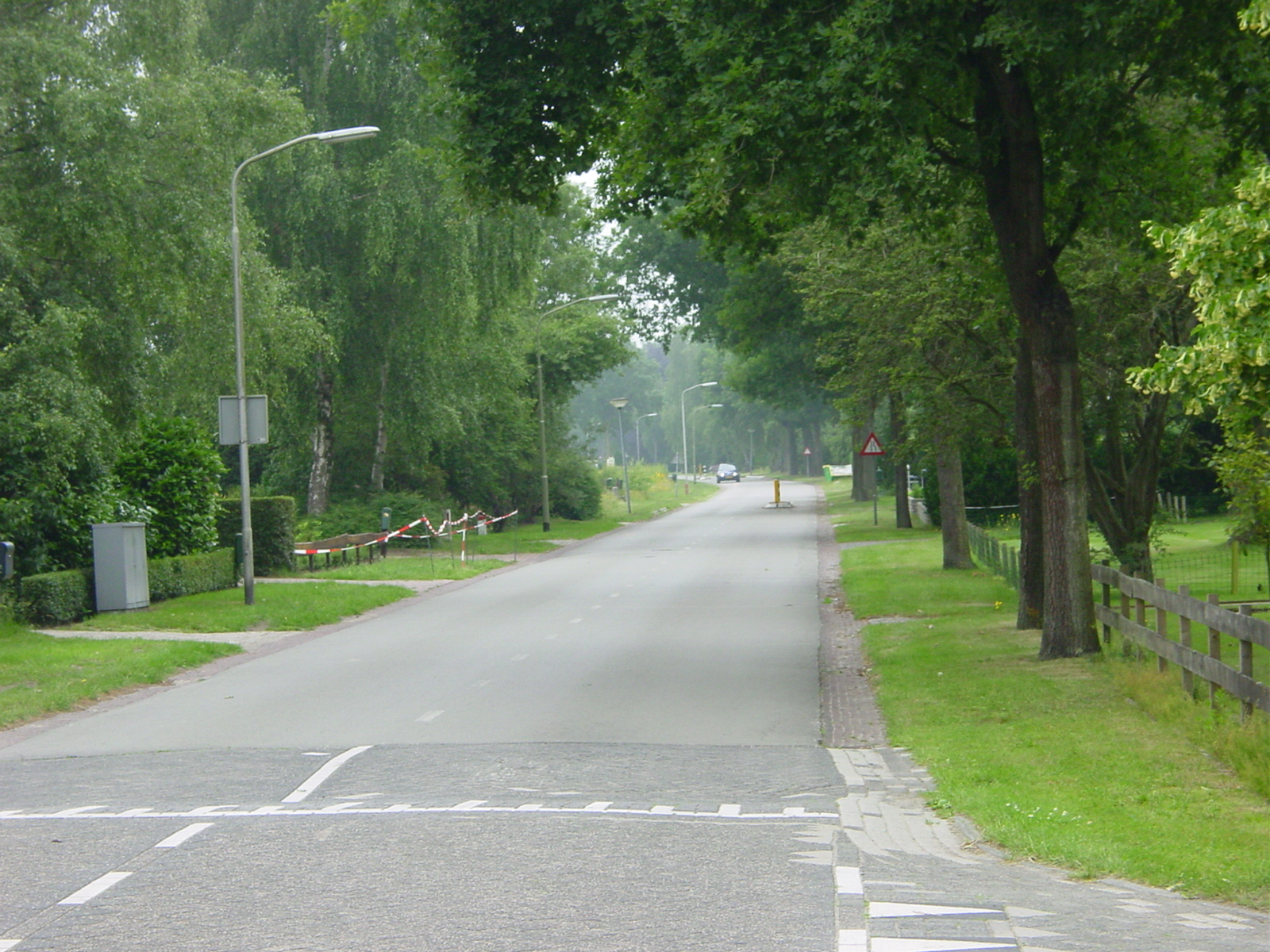
- Road in 't Haantje

- Location within Drenthe Location within Netherlands Location within Benelux
- Coordinates: 52°48′53″N 6°49′23″E
- Country: Netherlands
- Province: Drenthe
- Municipality: Coevorden

Area
  - Total: 4.60 km^{2} (1.78 sq mi)
- Elevation: 19 m (62 ft)

Population (2021)
  - Total: 235
  - Density: 51.1/km^{2} (132/sq mi)
- Time zone: UTC+1 (CET)
  - Summer (DST): UTC+2 (CEST)
- Postal code: 7847
- Dialing code: 0591

't Haantje (the Little Rooster) is a small village in the northeastern Netherlands. It is situated northwest of Emmen and is part of the municipality of Coevorden. It lies along the Oranjekanaal, between Noord-Sleen and Klijndijk.

't Haantje was first mentioned in 1874. The etymology is unclear. It was founded when peat labourers decided to settle there. On 1 December 1965, the village barely escaped a disaster. A French company working for the N.A.M. was drilling for gas, and started to lose control of the enormous gas pressure. During the afternoon, this resulted in a huge gas eruption. The ground around the hole caved in - swallowing all of the drilling equipment. The gas eruption was eventually stopped by a cement injection from a new drilling hole. A small lake lake surrounded by a forest forms a permanent reminder of this event.
