= Sleen =

- Village
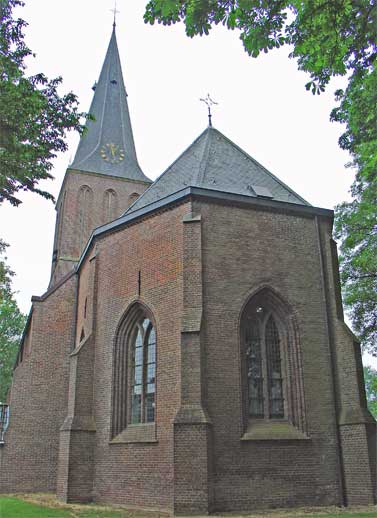
- Church in Sleen

- Location within Drenthe Location within Netherlands
- Coordinates: 52°46′24″N 6°48′7″E
- Country: Netherlands
- Province: Drenthe
- Municipality: Coevorden

Area
  - Total: 12.41 km^{2} (4.79 sq mi)
- Elevation: 17 m (56 ft)

Population (2021)
  - Total: 2,245
  - Density: 180.9/km^{2} (468.5/sq mi)
- Time zone: UTC+1 (CET)
  - Summer (DST): UTC+2 (CEST)
- Postal code: 7841
- Dialing code: 0591

Sleen is a village in Drenthe, Netherlands of about 2,500 people. Sleen has been inhabited for centuries. Much ancient history can be found in the area, particularly in the forests (which are planted, though). At birth and during the Republiek der Zeven Verenigde Nederlanden (Republic of the Seven United Netherlands (1581–1795)). Sleen became the capital of one of the six “dingspels” (administrative areas) of Drenthe. When Drenthe was recognised as a province, Sleen became a municipality capital, before it merged into the municipality of Coevorden.

Sleen has a 450-year-old church. At about 68 meters, it is the highest church in the entire province. Nowadays, it functions as a Dutch Reformed Church. There is also another Protestant church in the village.

Sleen has its own supermarket (behind the former police station), library, fish stand (every Wednesday), cafés, a few other shops, hair salons, petrol station, sports park (soccer, tennis, multipurpose indoor complex), horse riding school, houses for the elderly, and other facilities. There are also two schools: CBS “de Fontein” (Christian primary school) and OBS “de Akker” (public primary school).

“De Brink” is the “centre” and the old part of the village, with some historic houses and a brick road. This is also where the two churches are, and other facilities like the former municipal centre. New houses were constructed over time, and an area known as “de nieuwbouw” is where the most recently constructed houses can be found.

The famous Pieterpad (a 498 kilometres (309 mi) long hiking route that runs from Pieterburen in the north of the country to the St Pietersberg in Maastricht in the south) goes straight through Sleen. The windmill De Hoop has been restored to working order.

== Notable people ==
- Joël Voordewind (born 1965), politician
