= Gees =

- Village
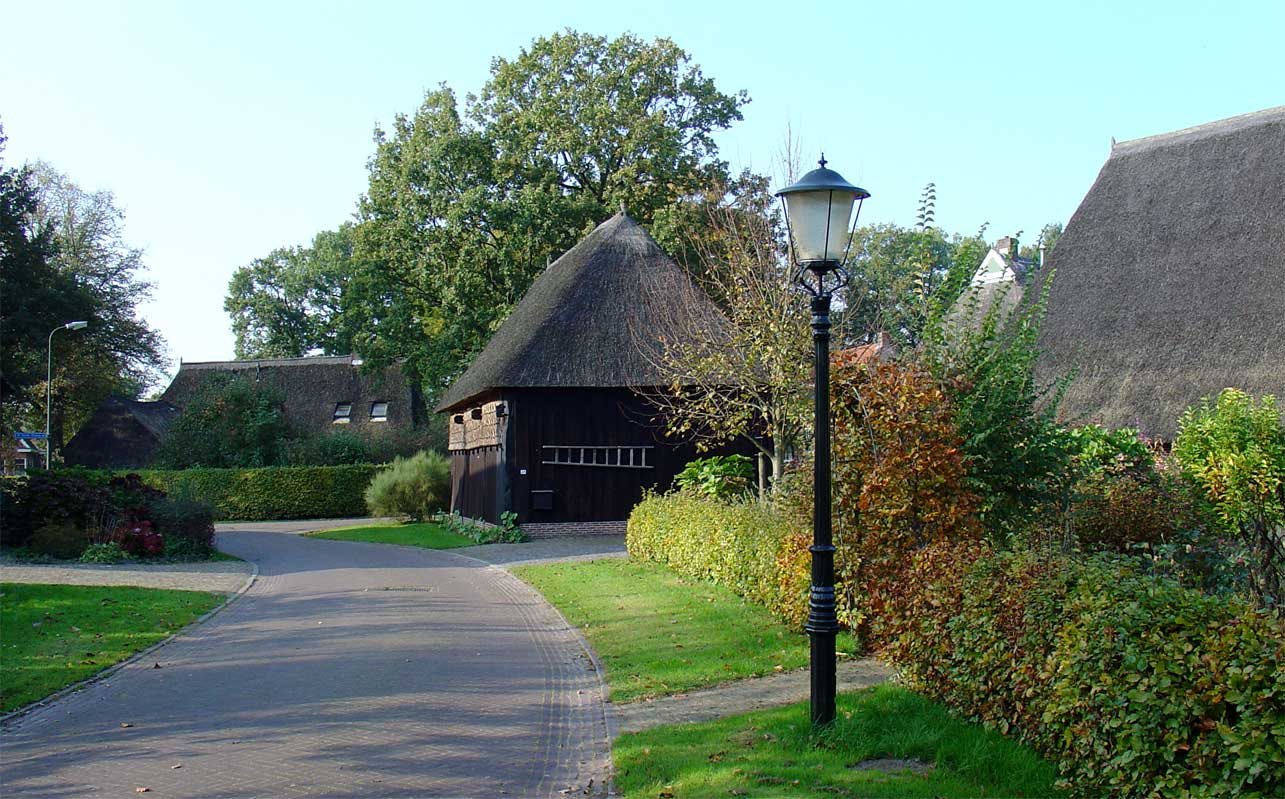
- Dorpsgezicht Gees

- Location within Drenthe Location within Netherlands
- Coordinates: 52°44′57″N 6°41′26″E

Area
  - Total: 12.72 km^{2} (4.91 sq mi)
- Elevation: 16 m (52 ft)

Population (2021)
  - Total: 615
  - Density: 48.3/km^{2} (125/sq mi)
- Time zone: UTC+1 (CET)
  - Summer (DST): UTC+2 (CEST)
- Postal code: 7863
- Dialing code: 0524

Gees is a village in the Netherlands and it is part of the Coevorden municipality in Drenthe.

Gees is an esdorp which developed in the Middle Ages on higher ground. It was first mentioned in 1207 or 1208 as Gies. The etymology is unclear. In 1840, the village was home to 465 people. The first church was built in 1857, and has been replaced in 1913.
