= Alteveer =

Alteveer can refer to several locations in the Netherlands:

- Alteveer, Groningen
- Alteveer, De Wolden, Drenthe
- Alteveer, Noordenveld, Drenthe
- Alteveer, Hoogeveen, Drenthe
- Alteveer, Gelderland
- Alteveer, Overijssel
