= Berghuizen, Drenthe =

Berghuizen
- Village
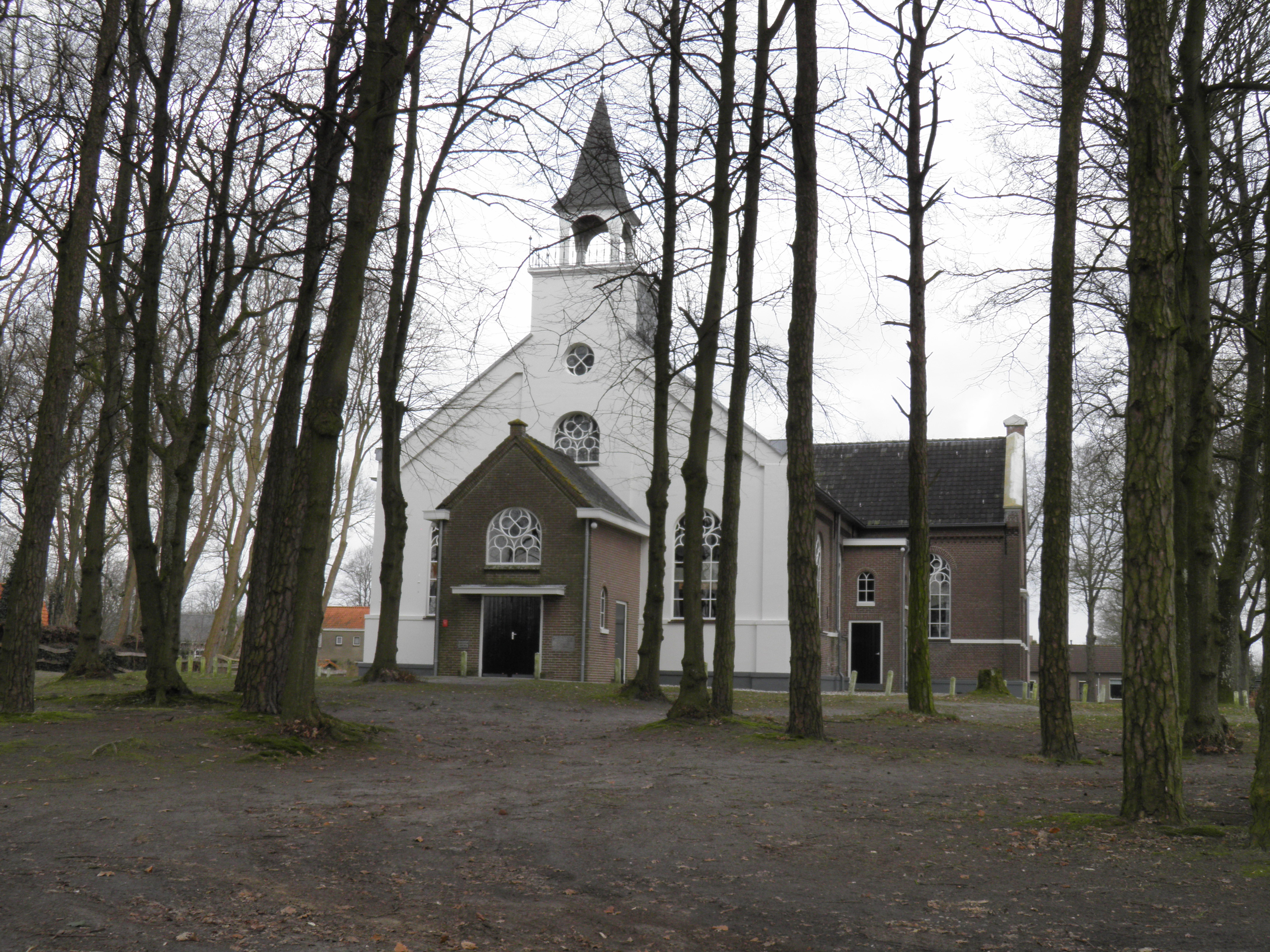
- Berghuizen church

- Location in the province of Drenthe in the Netherlands Berghuizen (Netherlands)
- Coordinates: 52.71340°N 6.28926°E
- Country: Netherlands
- Province: Drenthe
- Municipality: De Wolden
- Village: Ruinerwold

Area
  - Total: 1.87 km^{2} (0.72 sq mi)
  - Land: 1.87 km^{2} (0.72 sq mi)
  - Water: 0 km^{2} (0 sq mi)
- Elevation: 3.5 m (11 ft)

Population (2023)
  - Total: 150
  - Density: 80/km^{2} (210/sq mi)
- Time zone: UTC+1 (CET)
  - Summer (DST): UTC+2 (CEST)
- Postcode: 9411
- Area code: 0593

Berghuizen (Dutch: [ˈbɛrxˌɦœy̯.zə(n)]) is a village in the municipality of De Wolden, in the province of Drenthe. It has its own village core but falls under Ruinerwold administratively.

== Geography ==
The village is located near the N375 between Ruinerwold and Koekange and has its own built-up area, but Ruinerwold must be mentioned when addressing. A few houses are located on a small lake called the Gat van Berghuizen (also known as Trekgat or Barger Trekgat). This small lake is a so-called pingo ruin, a remnant from the ice ages. It is now a nature reserve owned by the association Natuurmonumenten. A number of houses are located on sandy paths around this nature reserve.

== Church ==
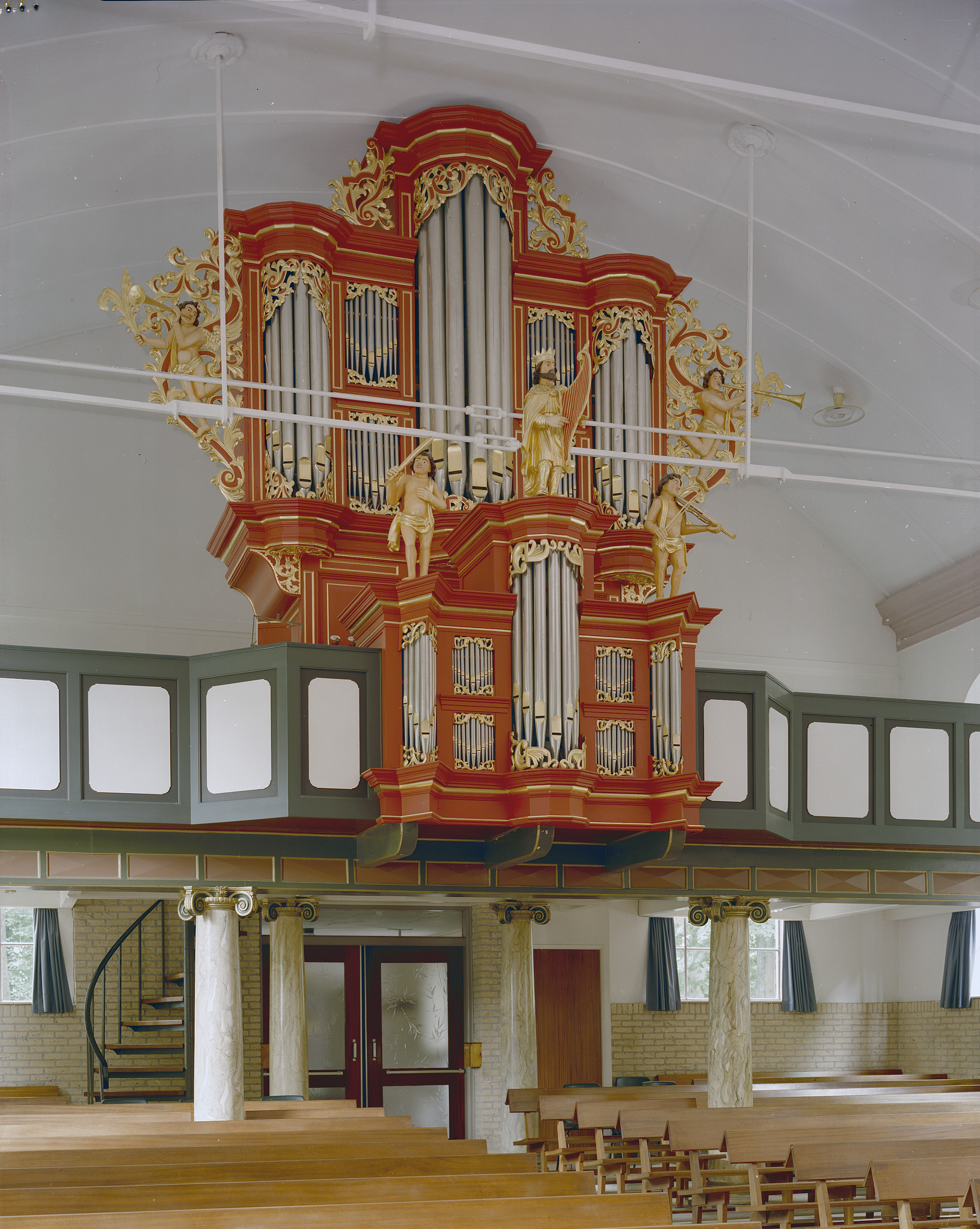
Berghuizen church organ

The church building of the Reformed Church congregation of Ruinerwold and Koekange is located in Berghuizen. This congregation is one of the oldest Reformed churches in Drenthe, established by Rev. Hendrik de Cock in 1835. Until 1846, the church had a theological college, the forerunner of the theological university in Kampen. The school was located at the Trekgat in Berghuizen. The church has been affiliated with the PKN since 1 May 2004.

The current church building dates from 1875, and is a replacement of an older building from 1841. The church has the status of a national monument because of the church organ, which was made in 1743 by the organ builder Matthias Amoor for the Reformed Church in Raamsdonk. In 1850 it moved to the Reformed Church of Aartswoud and in 1884 it was sold to the church in Berghuizen. During a restoration in 1951, K. Doornbos provided it with a so-called 'rugpositief' and a free pedal. These attributes were maintained when the Flentrop company restored the organ again in 1978.
