= Alteveer, Hoogeveen =

Alteveer
- Hamlet
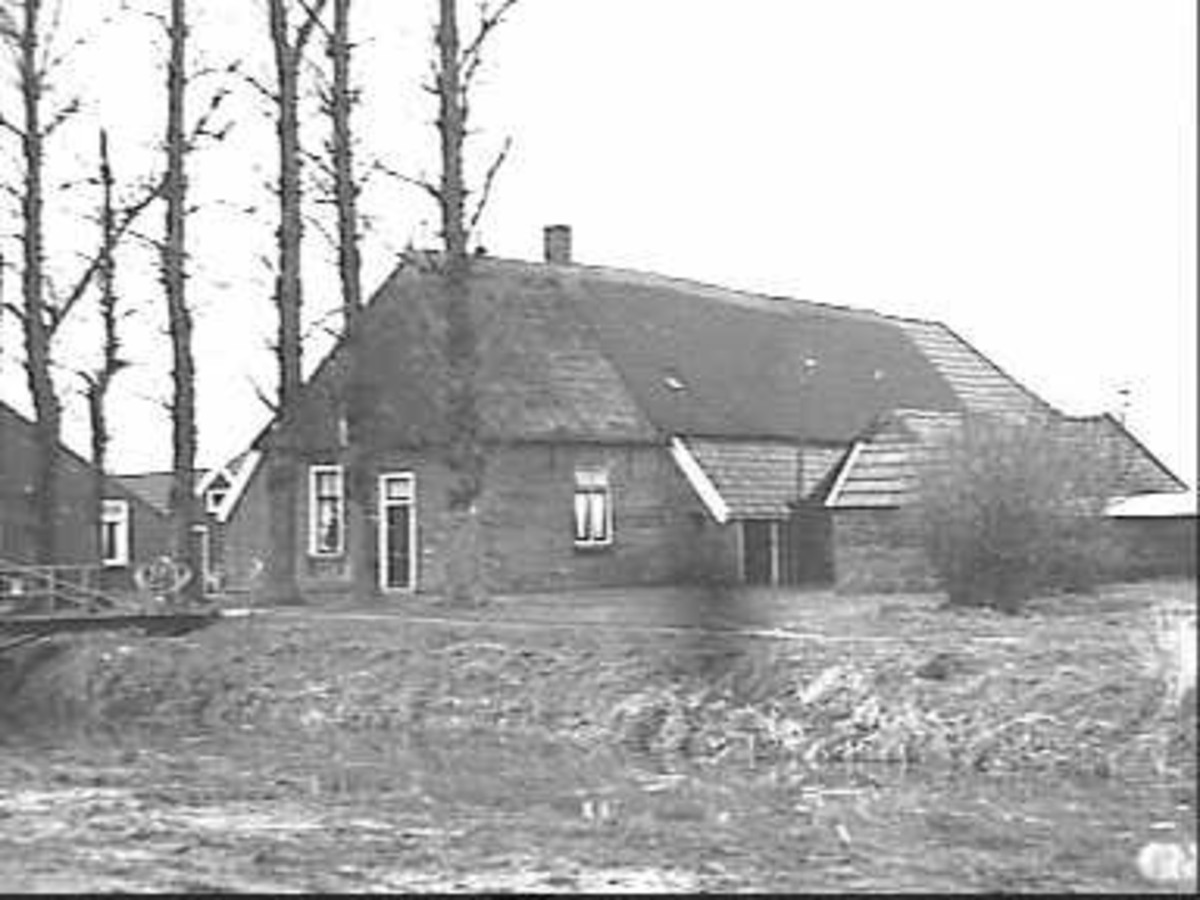
- Farmhouse in Alteveer, 1960

- Location in the province of Drenthe in the Netherlands Alteveer (Netherlands)
- Coordinates: 52°41′N 6°30′E
- Country: Netherlands
- Province: Drenthe
- Municipality: Hoogeveen
- Elevation: 11.5 m (38 ft)

Population (2021)
  - Total: 163
- Time zone: UTC+1 (CET)
  - Summer (DST): UTC+2 (CEST)
- Postcode: 7915
- Area code: 0528

Alteveer (Dutch pronunciation: [ˈɑltəveːr]) is a hamlet in the municipality of Hoogeveen in the province of Drenthe in the Netherlands. As of 2021, it had a population of 163. It is located south of the town of Hoogeveen and northeast of the village of Alteveer in the municipality of De Wolden.

The area surrounding Alteveer consist of agricultural land, historically used for peat extraction.
