= Hendrikje Doelen =

Dutch serial killer

- Born: Hendrikje Geerts Meilofs Doelen; 1 June 1784; Oosterwijk, Dutch Republic
- Died: 10 December 1847 (aged 63); Gouda, South Holland, Netherlands
- Conviction: Murder
- Penalty: Death; commuted to 20 years imprisonment

Details
- Victims: 7 (4 deaths)
- Span of crimes: 1845–1846
- Country: Netherlands

Hendrikje Geerts Meilofs Doelen (1 June 1784 – 10 December 1847) was a Dutch serial killer.

== Poisonings ==
On 7 May 1819, the farmwife Hendrikje Doelen married the almost six years older Aaldert Mulder in the Drenthe town of De Wijk. Both were poor day labourers. In 1827, both were admitted to the district's poorhouse. Suddenly, in 1845 several people mysteriously died. First of all, on 7 April, her husband Aaldert and an old woman named Jantje Wichers, who was living with the couple, died. A few days later, the three children of Arend Hut, who also lived in the poorhouse, became ill after eating oatmeal pulp that they had received from Hendrikje Doelen. Half a year later, on 14 October, her neighbour Grietje van Buren died after eating pancakes made by Doelen. Her daughter, Evertje, also became seriously ill after eating those same pancakes and died ten months later on 9 August 1846.

== Arrest and trial ==
Doelen was suspected of murdering the persons mentioned. After an investigation, it was established that Wichers probably died from a natural death, but both the husband and Grietje van Buren were diagnosed with the presence of arsenic. Because no legal proof could be provided for her husband's murder, she was finally sentenced to death on 15 January 1847, for the murder of Van Buren by the provincial court of Assen.

Doelen denied her guilt at the hearing, but the Supreme Court rejected her cassation request. She acknowledged her guilt in her pardon request. In it, she admits she killed her husband because of the marital quarrelling and her neighbour and daughter because of spite. The Supreme Court advised negatively about the petition, but the then minister of justice Marinus Willem de Jonge of Campensnieuwland gave positive advice, also in view of her age. King William II granted her clemency by royal order on 14 November 1847.

On 2 December 1847, she was displayed for half an hour with the noose on the scaffold in Assen. The death penalty was changed to a prison sentence of 20 years. She died, however, after eight days, on 10 December 1847, in the women's prison of Gouda.

== Bibliography ==
- Koetsveld van Ankeren, J. van Hendrikje Geerts Meilofs Targets, widow of Aaldert Mulder: a test of remarkable criminal procedure in respect of poisoning. Schoonhoven, 1847
- Ruller, Sibo van Genade voor recht: Gratification to sentenced to death in the Netherlands 1806-1870 ed. De Bataafse Leeuw, Amsterdam, 1987, ISBN 90 6707 162 5
- Zeijden, JR van der Gifmoord in the District: Our Value, volume 9 (p. 198-204), ed. Drentse Historische Vereniging, Assen, 1989

== See also ==
- List of serial killers by country
