= Witteveen, De Wolden =

Witteveen
- Location in province of Drenthe in the Netherlands Witteveen (Netherlands)
- Coordinates: 52°47′00″N 6°21′25″E
- Country: Netherlands
- Province: Drenthe
- Municipality: De Wolden

Witteveen is a hamlet in the Drenthe municipality of De Wolden, the Netherlands. Witteveen lies north of Ruinen on the edge of the Dwingelderveld National Park. It is considered a part of Ruinen, and has about 15 houses and 2 bungalow parks.

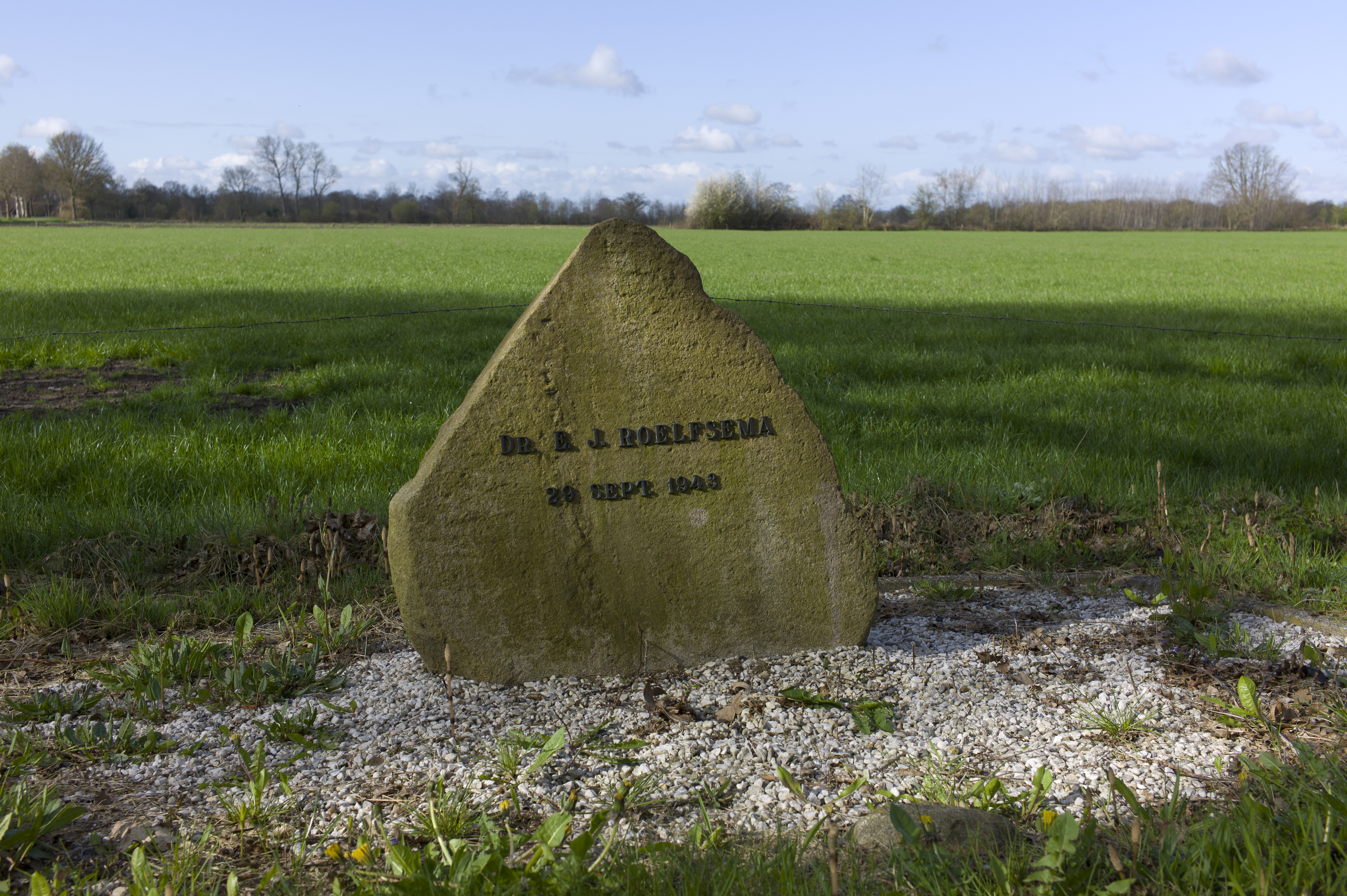
War memorial in Witteveen
