= Nolden =

Nolden is both a surname and masculine given name. The surname is of Dutch and German origin, a patronymic from the surname Nolde, which may either be a shortened form of Arnold or a toponymic surname, while the given name is of English-language origin and means 'noble one'. Notable people with the name include:

== Surname ==
- Michelle Nolden (born 1973), Canadian actress
- Wes Nolden, American military officer and bishop

== Given name ==
- Nolden Gentry (born 1937), American basketball player

== See also ==
- Nolde (disambiguation)
