= Jan Hendrik de Boer =

Dutch physicist and chemist

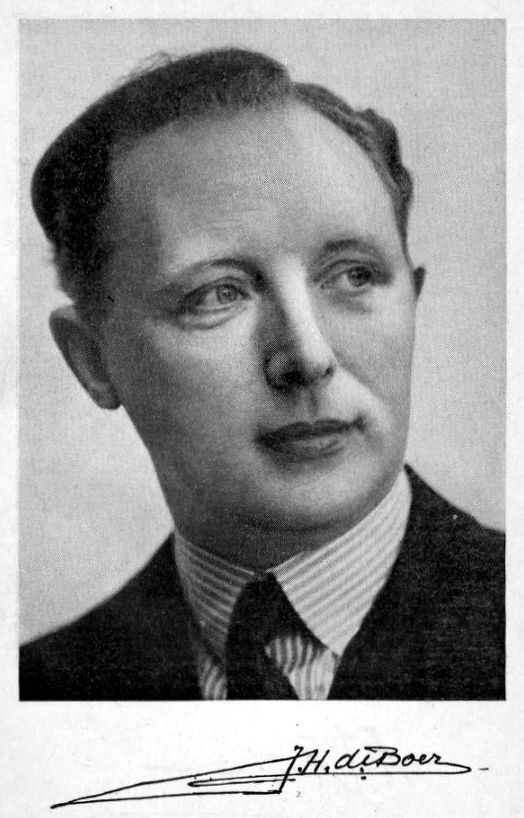
- J. H. de Boer, 1947
- Born: March 19, 1899; Ruinen, Netherlands
- Died: April 25, 1971 (aged 72); The Hague, Netherlands
- Education: University of Groningen
- Known for: Van Arkel–de Boer process Metal–insulator transition

Jan Hendrik de Boer (19 March 1899 – 25 April 1971) was a Dutch physicist and chemist.

De Boer was born in Ruinen, De Wolden, and died in The Hague. He studied at the University of Groningen and was later employed in industry.

Together with Anton Eduard van Arkel, de Boer developed a chemical transport reaction for titanium, zirconium, and hafnium known as the crystal bar process. In a closed vessel the metal reacts with iodine at elevated temperature forming the iodide. At a tungsten filament of 1700 °C the reverse reaction occurs, and the iodine and the metal are set free. The metal forms a solid coating at the tungsten filament and the iodine can react with additional metal, resulting in a steady turnover.

M + 2I_{2} (>400 °C) → MI_{4}
MI_{4} (1700 °C) → M + 2I_{2}

This process is now known as Van Arkel–de Boer process.

However, in 1937 De Boer and Evert Verwey reported that many transition-metal oxides (such as NiO) with a partially filled d-band were poor conductors, often insulating. This led to the concept of metal–insulator transition.

In 1940, De Boer became a member of the Royal Netherlands Academy of Arts and Sciences, and foreign member in 1947.
