= Ruinerwold =

- Village
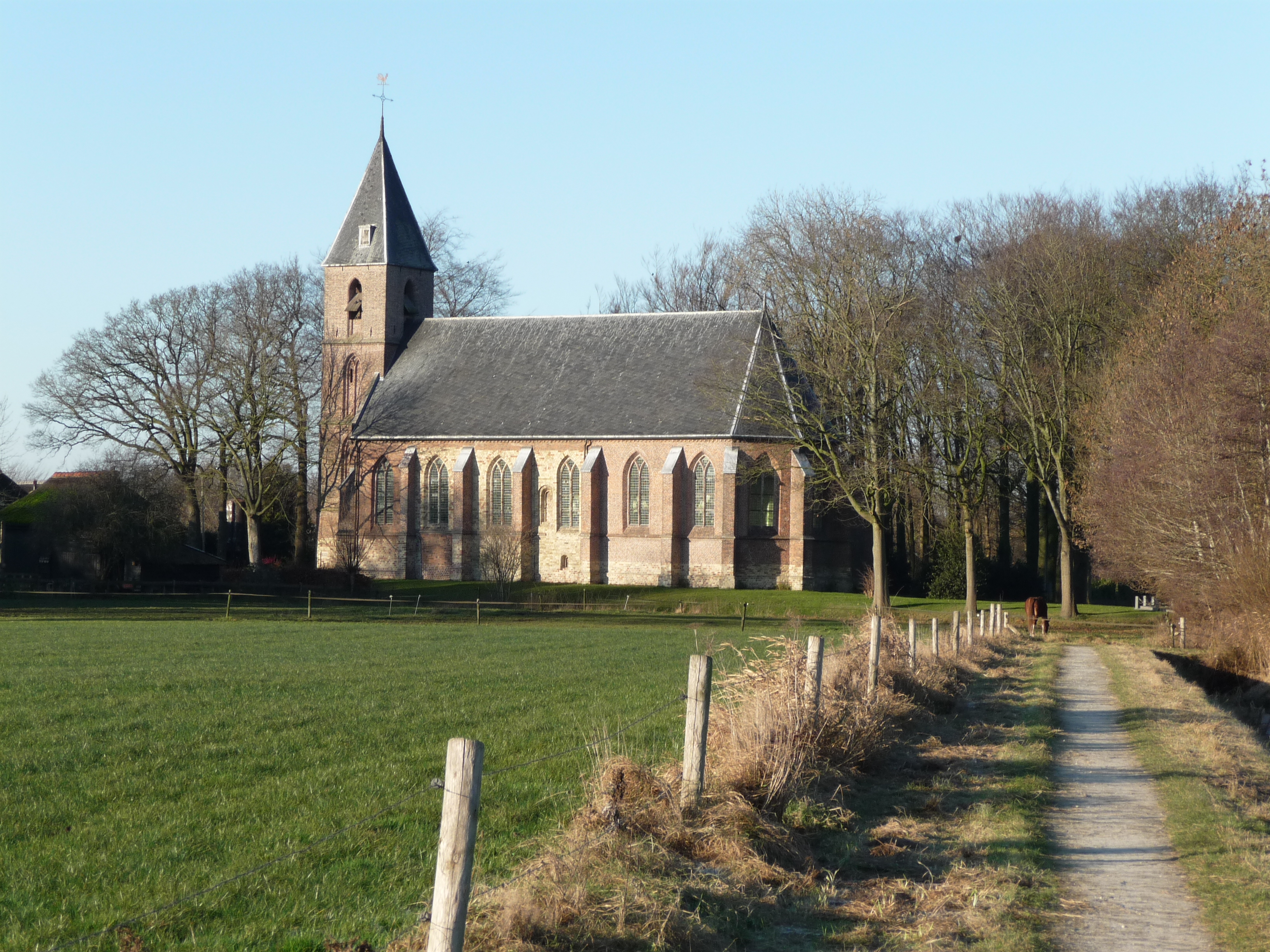
- Local church

- Flag Coat of arms

- Location in province of Drenthe in the Netherlands Ruinerwold (Netherlands)
- Coordinates: 52°43′22″N 6°15′2″E
- Country: Netherlands
- Province: Drenthe
- Municipality: De Wolden

Area
  - Total: 34.45 km^{2} (13.30 sq mi)
- Elevation: 2 m (6.6 ft)

Population (2021)
  - Total: 3,950
  - Density: 115/km^{2} (297/sq mi)
- Time zone: UTC+1 (CET)
  - Summer (DST): UTC+2 (CEST)
- Postal code: 7961
- Dialing code: 0522

Ruinerwold is a village in the Dutch province of Drenthe. It is located in the municipality of De Wolden, about 6 km northeast of Meppel.

== History ==
The village was first mentioned in 1792 as Ruiner Wold, and means "the swampforest belonging to Ruinen". Ruinerwold is a road village which developed on a sandy ridge since the 13th century.

The Dutch Reformed church is located in the former hamlet of Blijdenstein which has merged into Ruinerwold. The original Romanesque church (±1140) has been enlarged around 1425 in Gothic style. The upper part of the tower was restored after a 1730 fire. Rich farmers formerly lived in Ruinerwold, where they constructed expansive farmhouses with ornate embellishments.

Ruinerwold was home to 1,245 people in 1840. Ruinerwold was a separate municipality until 1998, when it became part of De Wolden.

== Hermit family ==
In October 2019, a 67-year-old man, Gerrit Jan van Dorsten, and his six adult children were discovered, who had lived for nine years in seclusion in a farm house in Ruinerwold. The father was charged with unlawful deprivation of liberty and harming other people's health. The charges were later dropped due to his poor health.

== Gallery ==
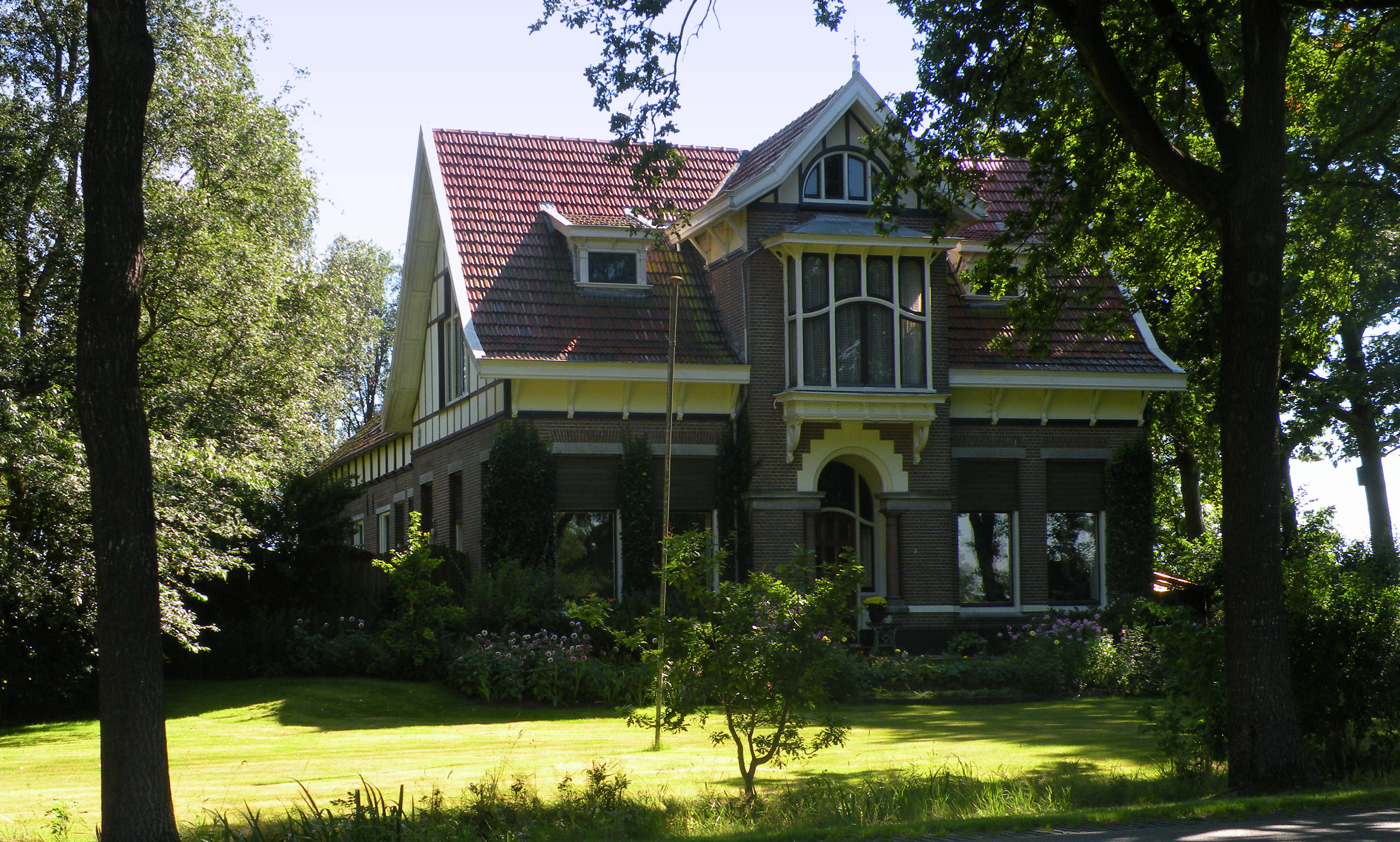
House in Ruinerwold

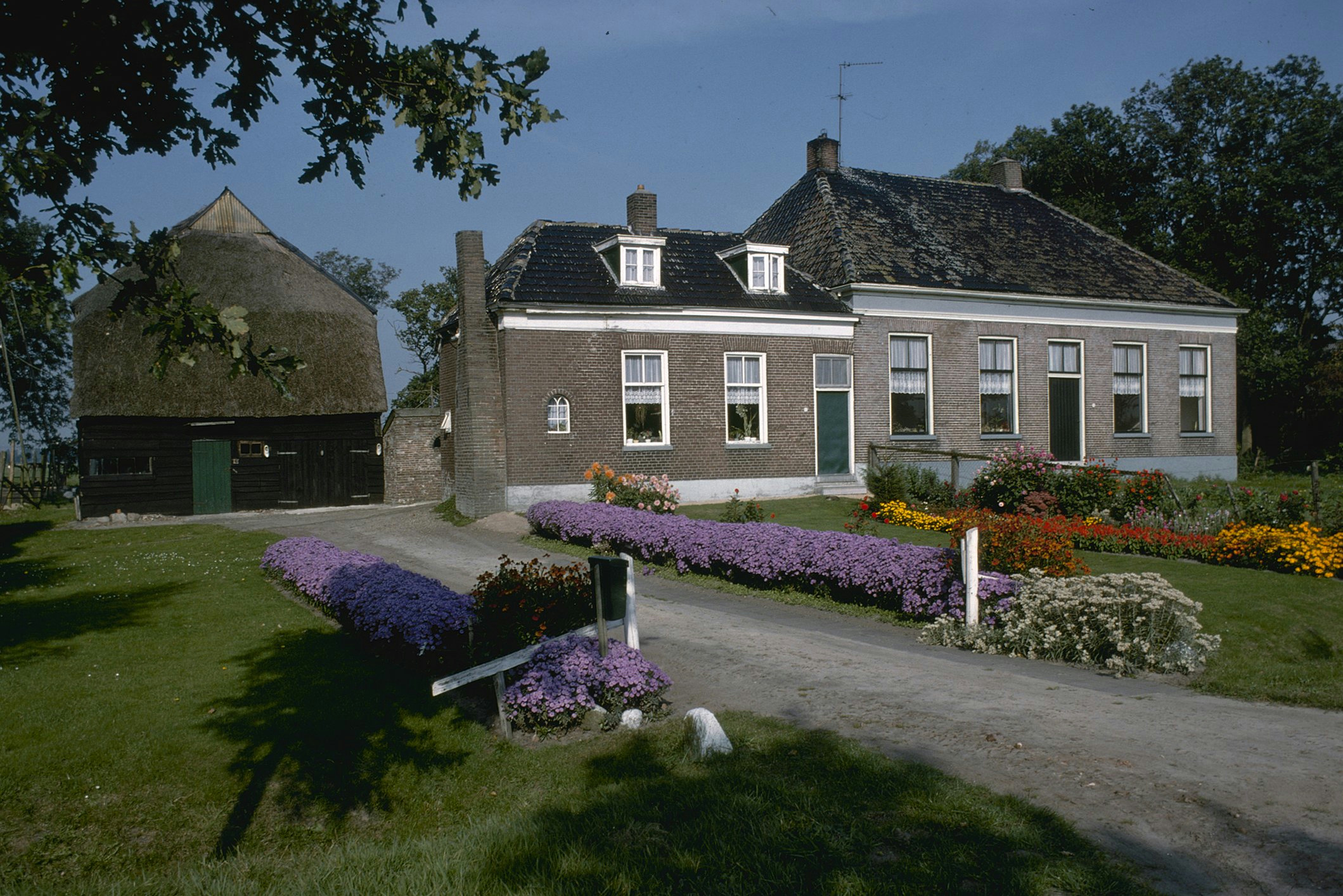
Farm in Ruinerwold

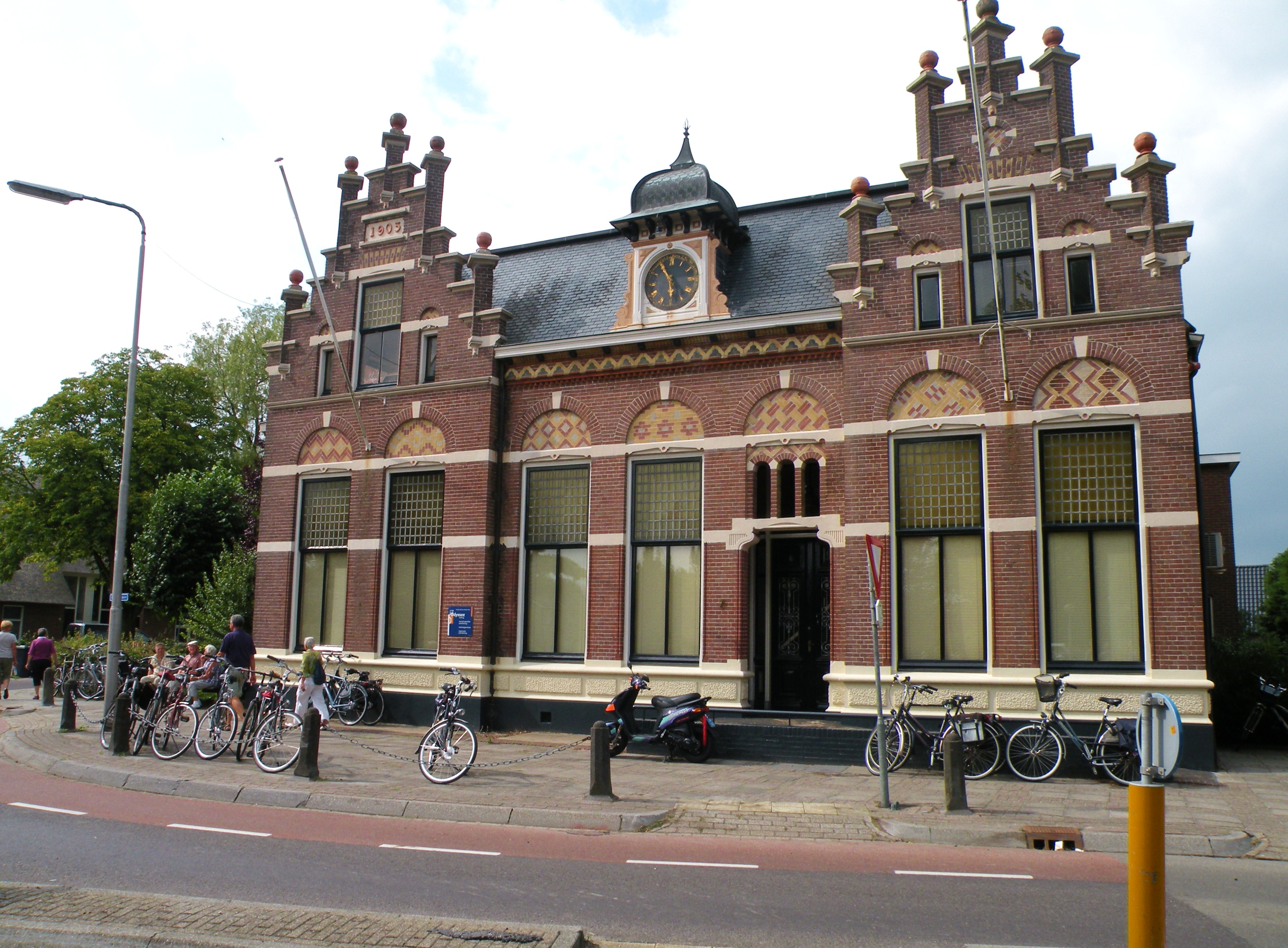
Former town hall

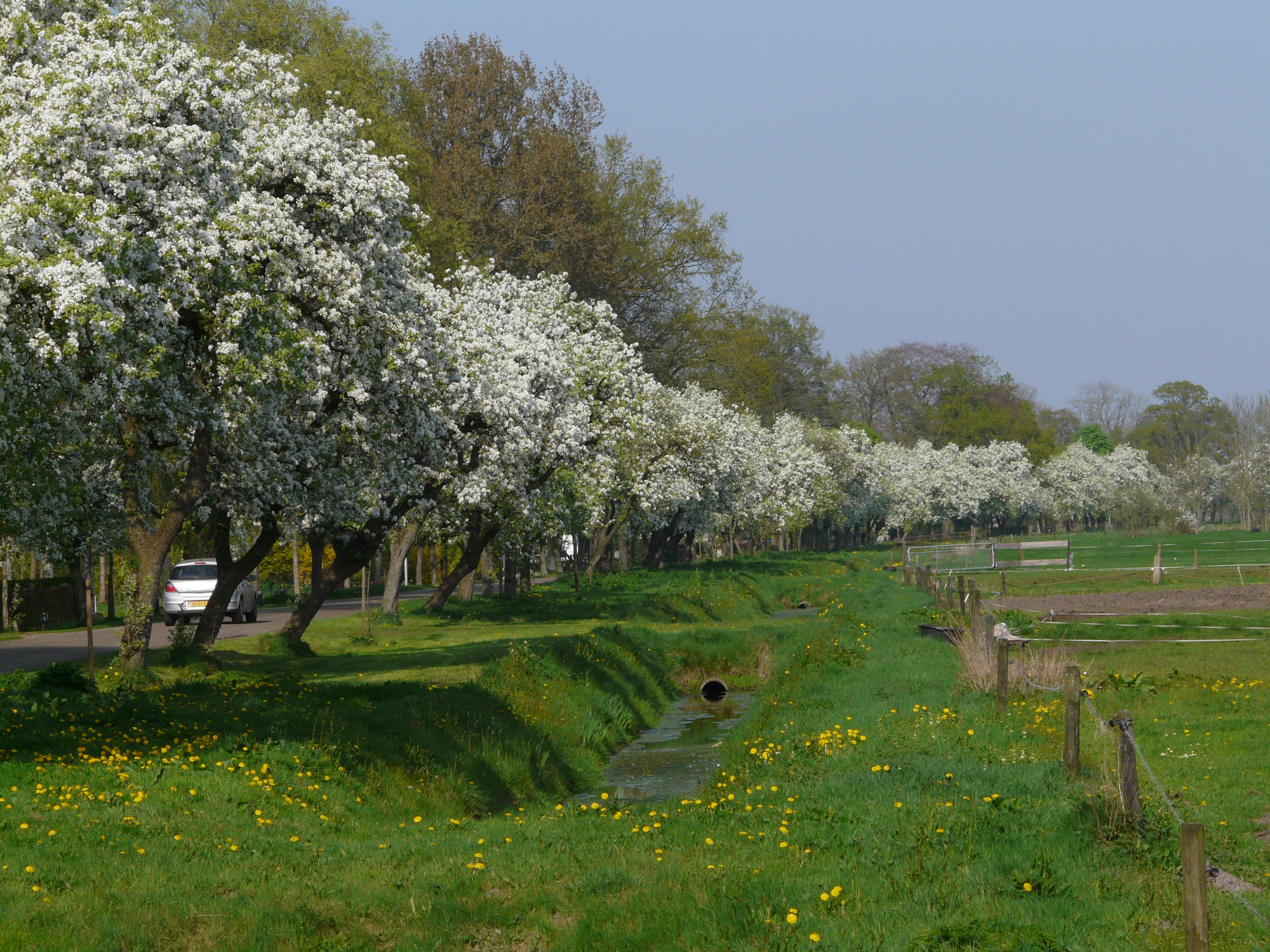
Trees along the road
