= De Wijk =

- Village
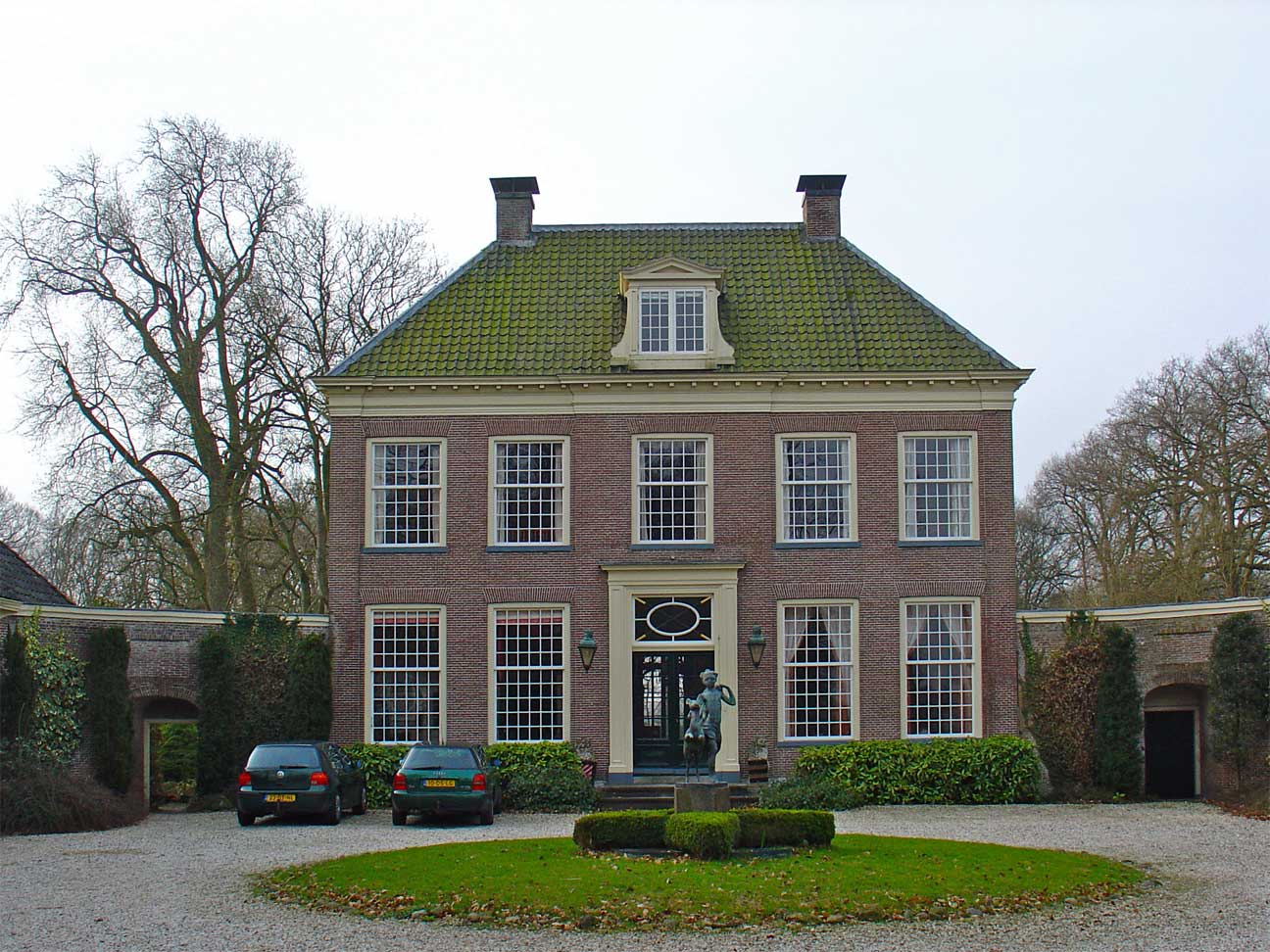
- Villa Voorwijk

- Flag Coat of arms

- Location of De Wijk in Drenthe De Wijk (Netherlands)
- Coordinates: 52°40′24″N 6°17′28″E
- Country: Netherlands
- Province: Drenthe
- Municipality: De Wolden

Area
  - Total: 10.90 km^{2} (4.21 sq mi)
- Elevation: 2.8 m (9.2 ft)

Population (2021)
  - Total: 2,965
  - Density: 272.0/km^{2} (704.5/sq mi)
- Time zone: UTC+1 (CET)
  - Summer (DST): UTC+2 (CEST)
- Postal code: 7957
- Dialing code: 0522

De Wijk (Dutch pronunciation: [də ˈʋɛik]) is a village in the Netherlands province of Drenthe. It is located in the municipality of De Wolden, and is about 7 km southeast of Meppel. It is home to Rijksmonument 39657, De Wieker Meule.

De Wijk was a separate municipality until 1998, when it became a part of De Wolden.

== History ==
De Wijk originated in the Middle Ages. In 1325, the monastery of Ruinen moved here, and this had a very strong impact on the development of the village. In 1672, marauding troops destroyed everything around de Havixhorst, including de Wijk. The monastery of Ruinen and mill of Dickninge also got destroyed. In 1811, the municipality of De Wijk was established. This municipality included de Wijk, Koekange, Oshaar, Rogat, de Schiphorst and de Stapel. After World War II the village was extended with new houses on the south side of the village. In 1998, the municipality of de Wijk became the new and current municipality 'De Wolden'.

== Notable people ==
- Jan Arend Godert de Vos van Steenwijk II (1818–1905), Dutch politician

== Gallery ==
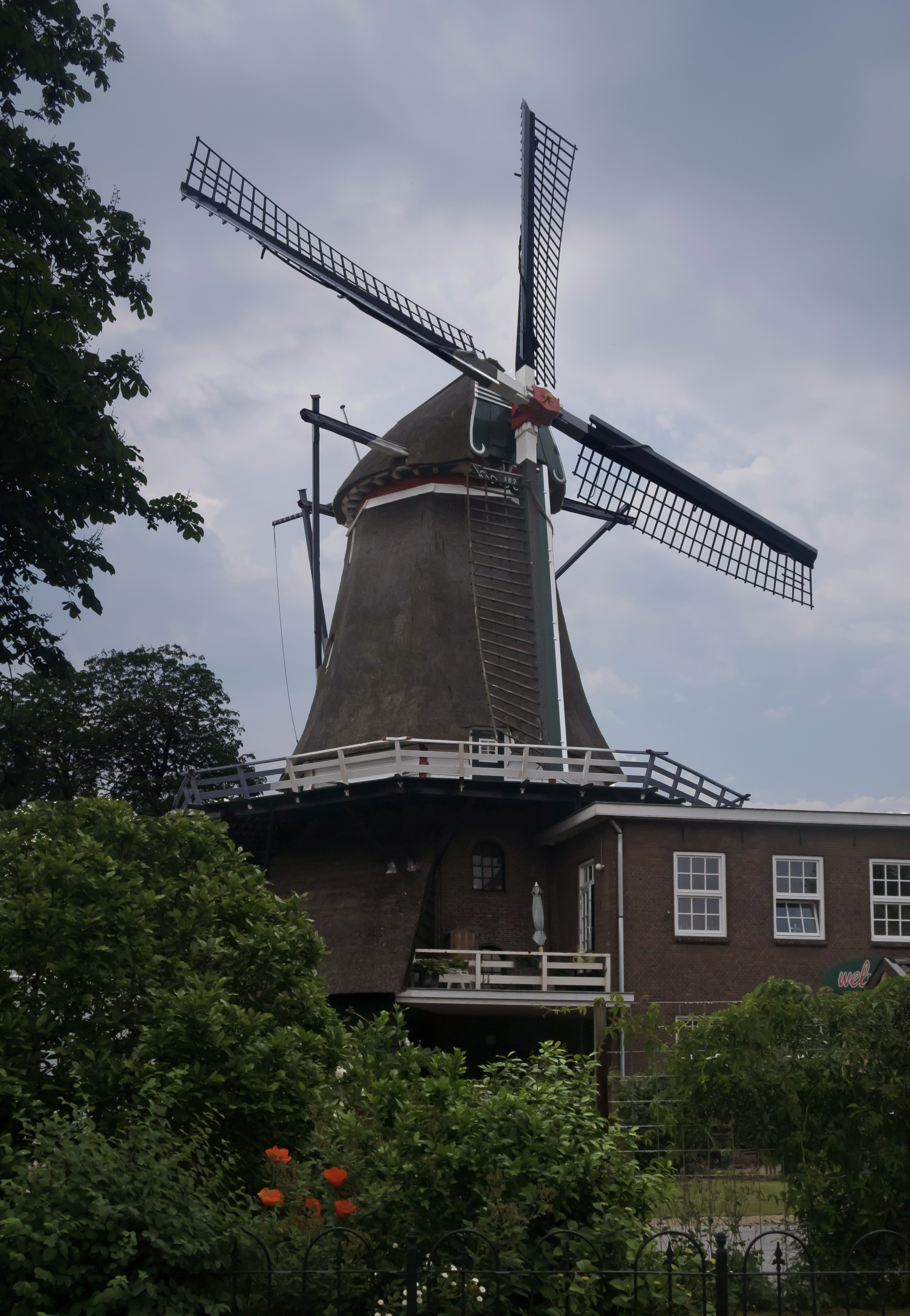
De Wijk, windmill de Wieker Meule

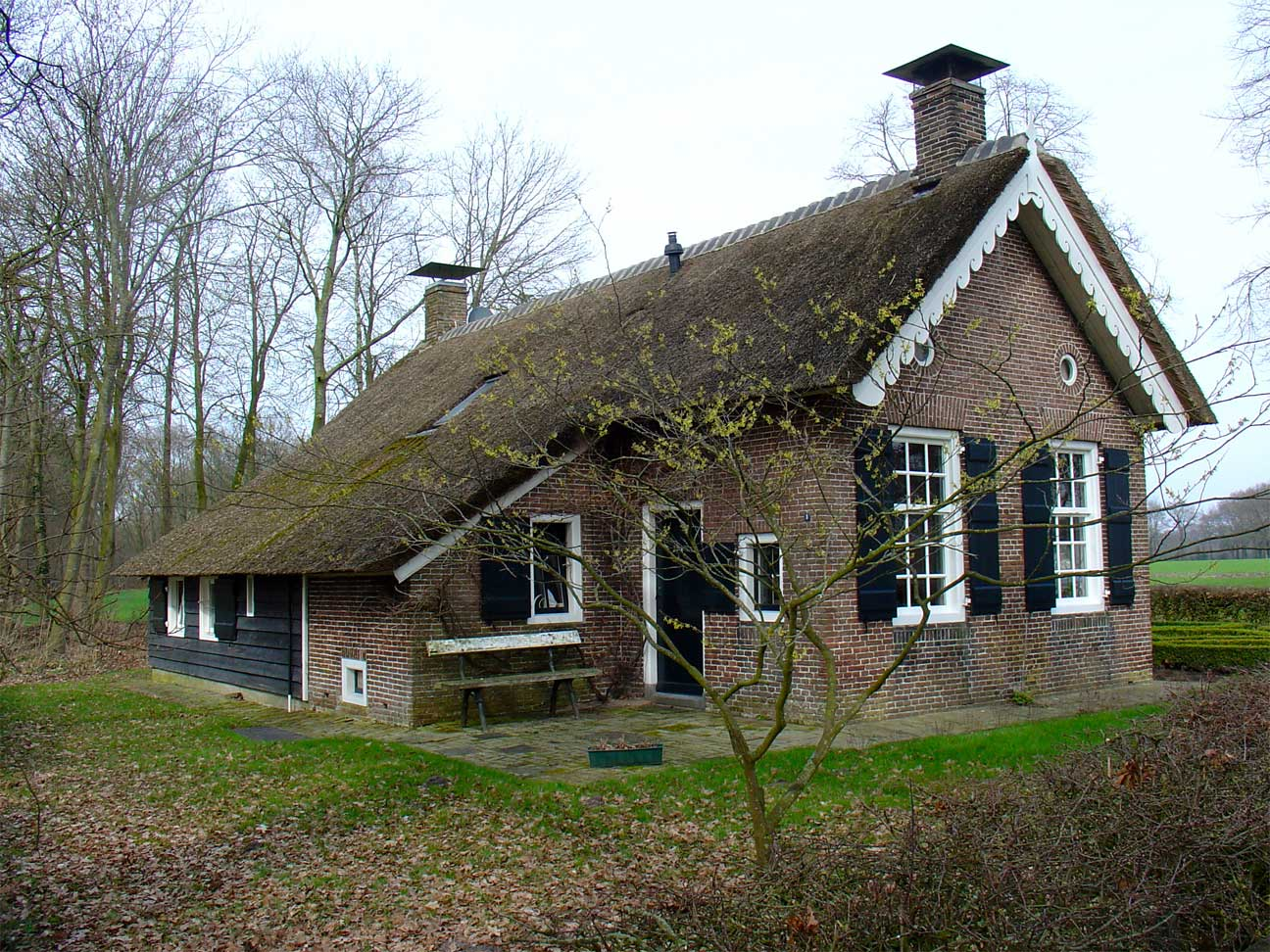
Former toll house annex farm

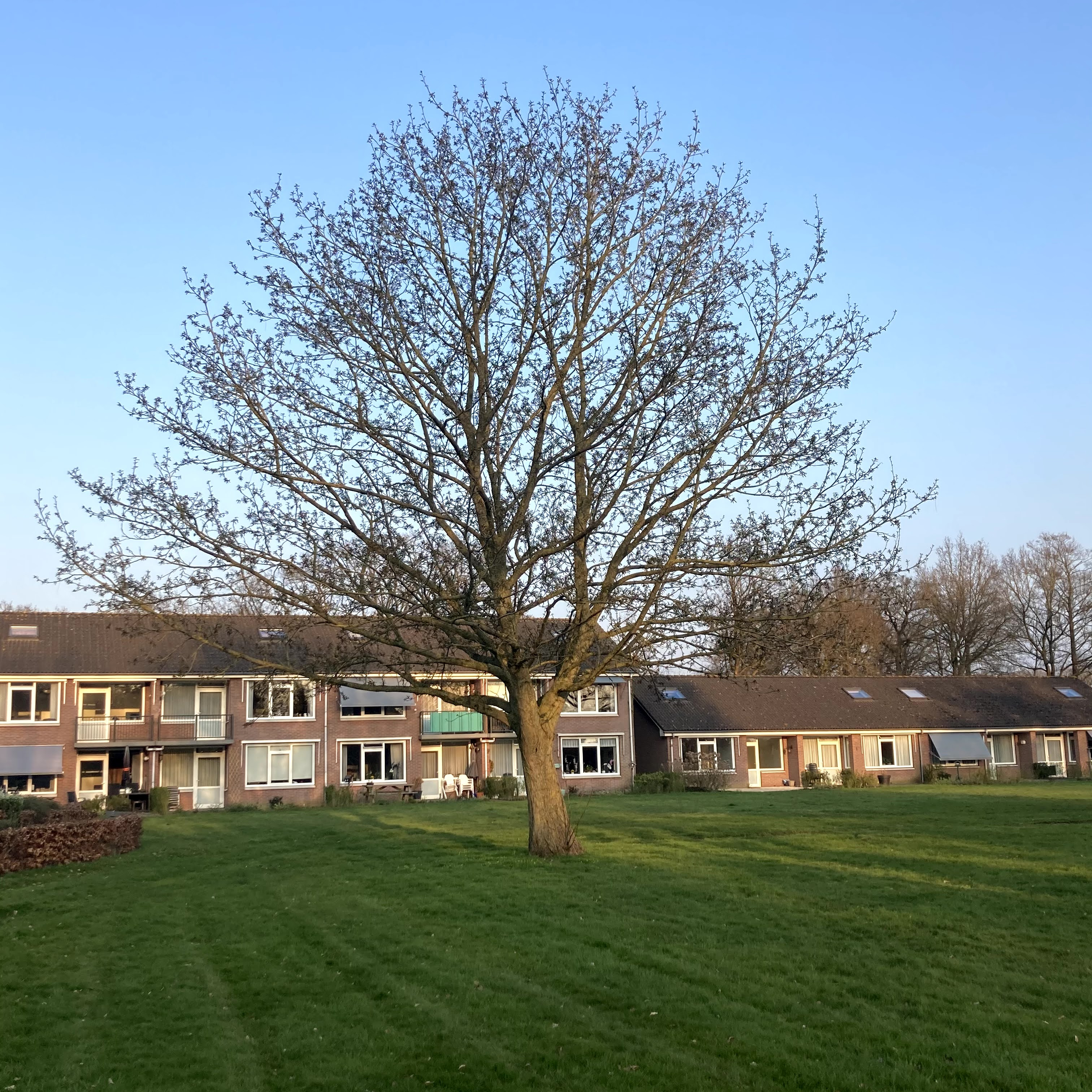
View on De Wijk

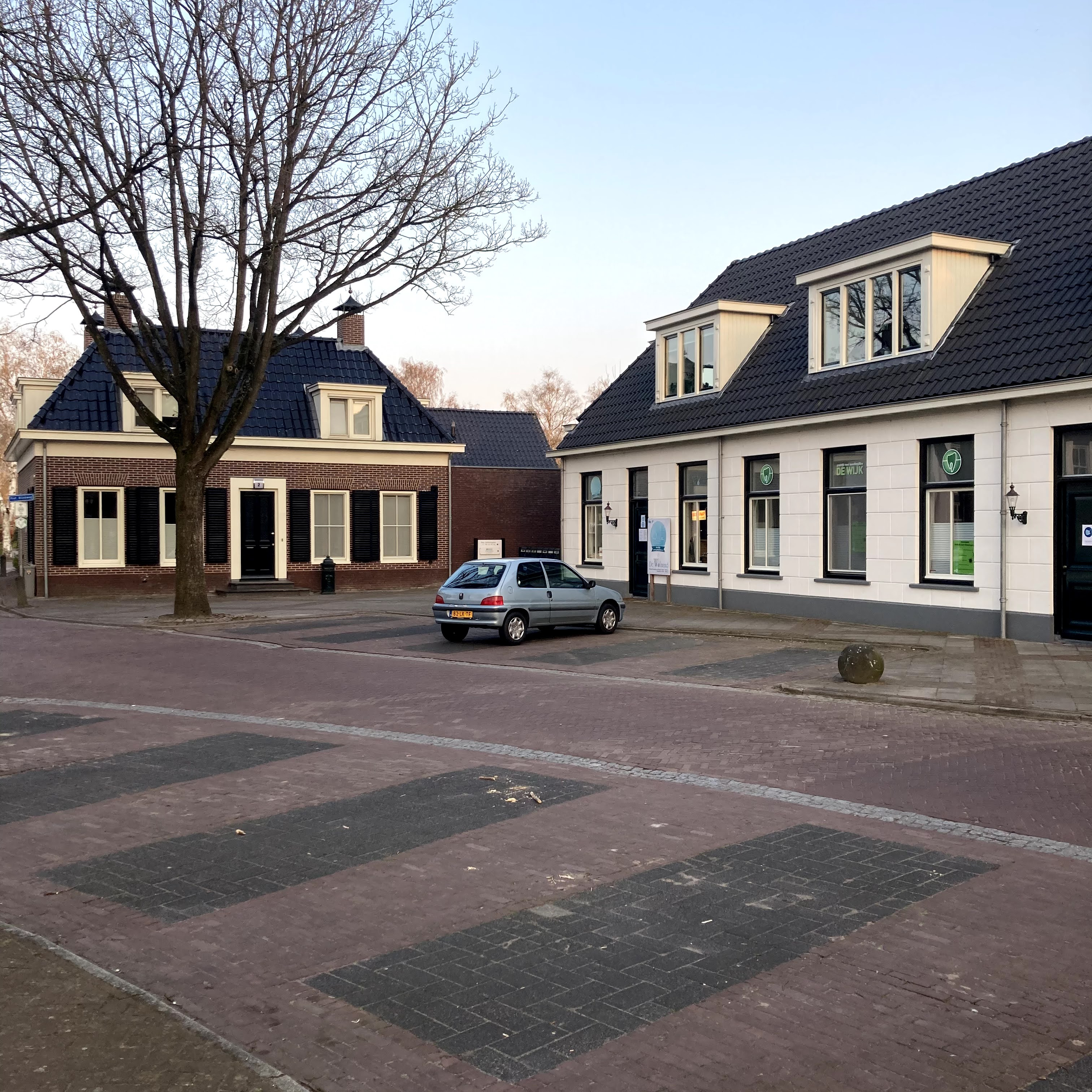
Street view
