= De Wieker Meule, De Wijk =

Windmill in De Wijk, Netherlands

De Wieker Meule
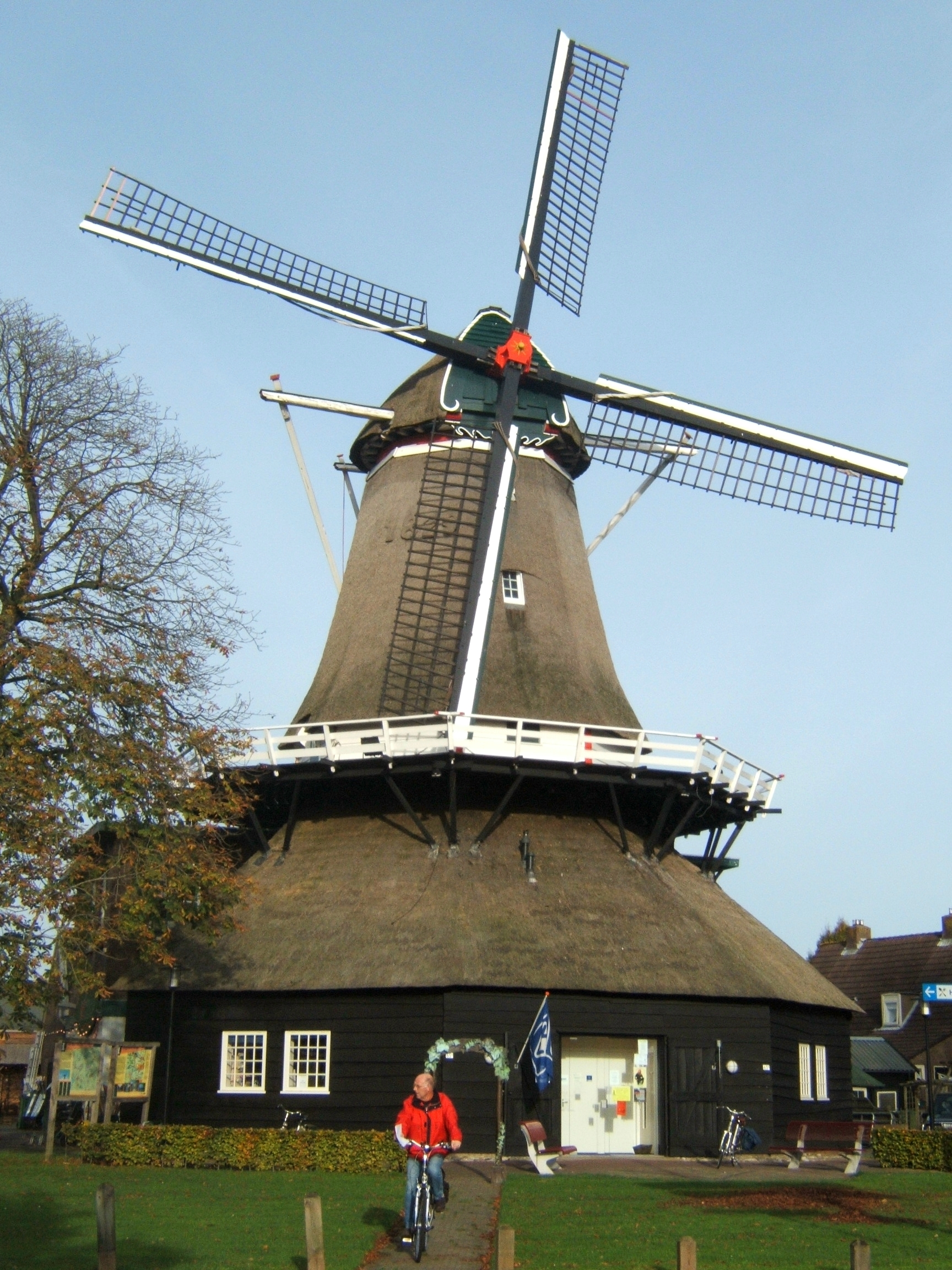
- Interactive map of De Wieker Meule

Origin
- Mill name: De Wieker Meule
- Mill location: Dorpsstraat 64, 7957 AS, De Wijk
- Coordinates: 52°40′20″N 6°17′13″E
- Operator: Stichting Wieker Meule
- Year built: 1829

Information
- Purpose: Corn mill
- Type: Smock mill
- Storeys: Three-storey smock
- Base storeys: Two-storey base
- Smock sides: Eight sides
- No. of sails: Four sails
- Type of sails: Common sails
- Windshaft: Cast iron
- Winding: Tailpole and winch
- No. of pairs of millstones: Two pairs of French Burrs
- Size of millstones: 1.50 metres (4 ft 11 in)

De Wieker Meule is a smock mill in De Wijk, Netherlands. It was built in 1829 and has been restored to working order. The mill is listed as a Rijksmonument, number 39657.

== History ==
De Wieker Meule was originally built in 1764 in De Leijen. In 1829, the mill was bought by Jacob Schiphorst Haalweide and moved to De Wijk. An extension was built against the base of the mill which housed two pairs of millstones driven by a diesel engine and later an electric motor. These were in addition to the two pairs of stones driven by the windmill. In 1926, the mill was bought by the Coöperative Landbouwbank. The ground floor was used at that time as a bank. In 1939, the sails of the mill were streamlined using the Dekker system. The mill ceased commercial operation in 1962. Restoration of the mill started in 1978, and was completed in 1980, with a new cap and sails. The Dekkerised sails were replaced with traditional common sails. The Vereniging voor Vreemdelingenverkeer established an office in the base of the mill. In 1996, the mill was bought by the Stichting Wieker Meule ("Wieker Mill Society").

== Description ==
De Wieker Meule what the Dutch describe as an achtkante stellingmolen – a smock mill with a stage. It is a three-storey smock mill on a two-storey base. The stage is at third-floor level, 8.70 metres (28 ft 7 in) above ground level. The smock and cap are thatched. The cap is winded by a tailpole and winch. The four common sails, which span 22.50 metres (73 ft 10 in), are carried on a cast-iron windshaft, cast by millwright Enthoven in 1863. The windshaft carries a clasp arm brake wheel with 59 cogs. This drives the wallower (29 cogs) at the top of the upright shaft. At the bottom of the upright shaft, the great spur wheel (105 cogs) drives two lantern pinion stone nuts, one having 34 staves and the other having 36 staves. These drive the two pairs of 1.50 metres (4 ft 11 in) diameter French Burr millstones.

== Public access ==
De Wieker Meule is open to the public from 13:00 to 18:00 on Saturdays.
