= Nolde =

Nolde may refer to:

People

- Emma Nolde (born 2000), Italian singer-songwriter and multi-instrumentalist
- Emil Nolde (1867–1956), German Danish painter
- Frederick Nolde (1899–1972), American human rights pioneer
- Jacob Nolde (1859–1916), American industrialist and environmentalist
- William Nolde (1929–1973), American military officer

Places

- Nolde, Denmark, a village in the Aabenraa Municipality
- Nolde, Netherlands, a hamlet in Drenthe province

Other

- 5698 Nolde, asteroid
