= Eursinge, De Wolden =

Eursinge
- Hamlet
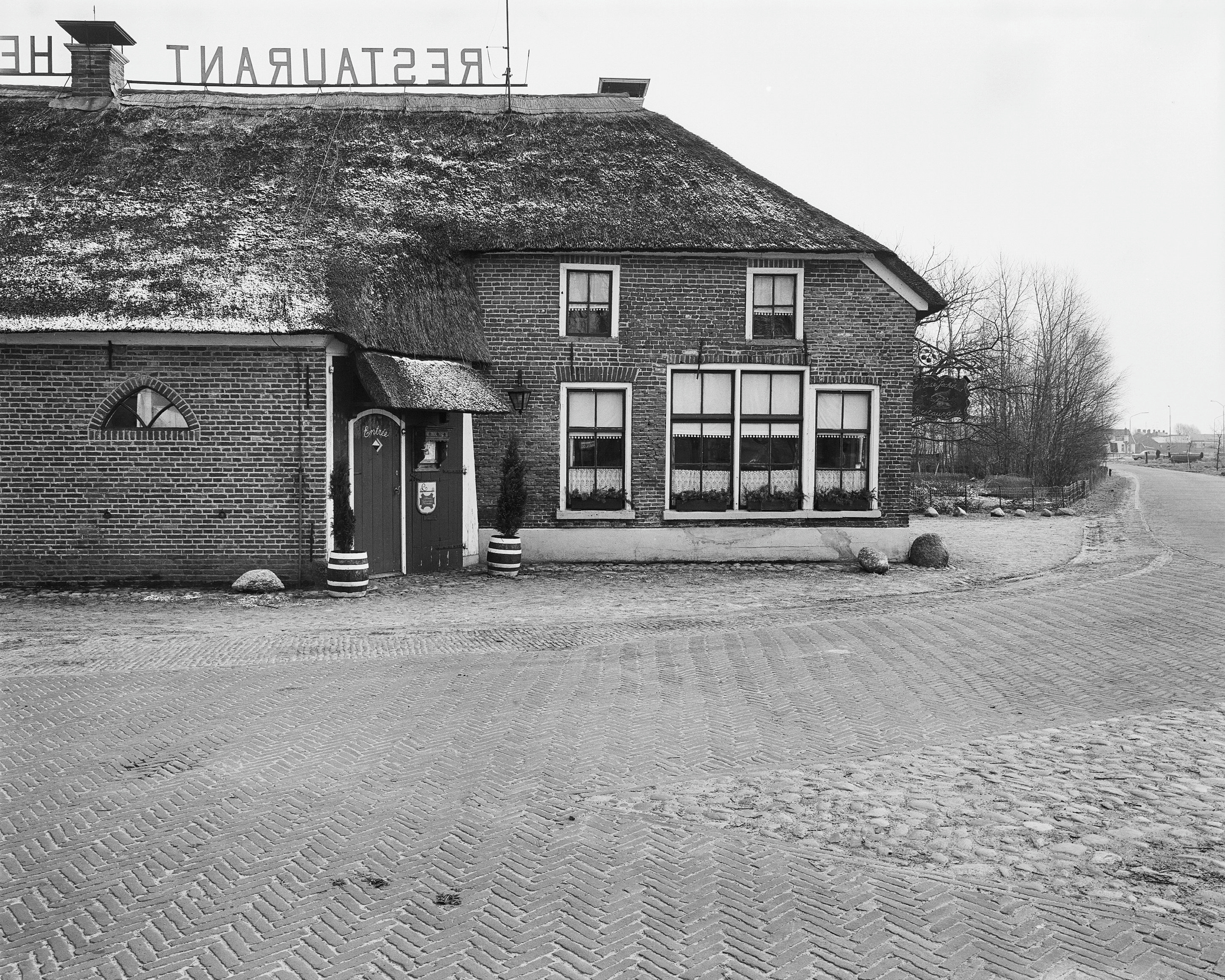
- Farm in use as restaurant

- Location in province of Drenthe in the Netherlands Eursinge (Netherlands)
- Coordinates: 52°46′37″N 6°26′41″E
- Country: Netherlands
- Province: Drenthe
- Municipality: De Wolden

Area
  - Total: 5.53 km^{2} (2.14 sq mi)
- Elevation: 11 m (36 ft)

Population (2021)
  - Total: 105
  - Density: 19.0/km^{2} (49.2/sq mi)
- Time zone: UTC+1 (CET)
  - Summer (DST): UTC+2 (CEST)
- Postal code: 7935
- Dialing code: 0528

Eursinge is a hamlet in the Dutch province of Drenthe. It is located in the municipality of De Wolden, less than 1 km northwest of the village of Pesse.
