= Ansen =

- Village
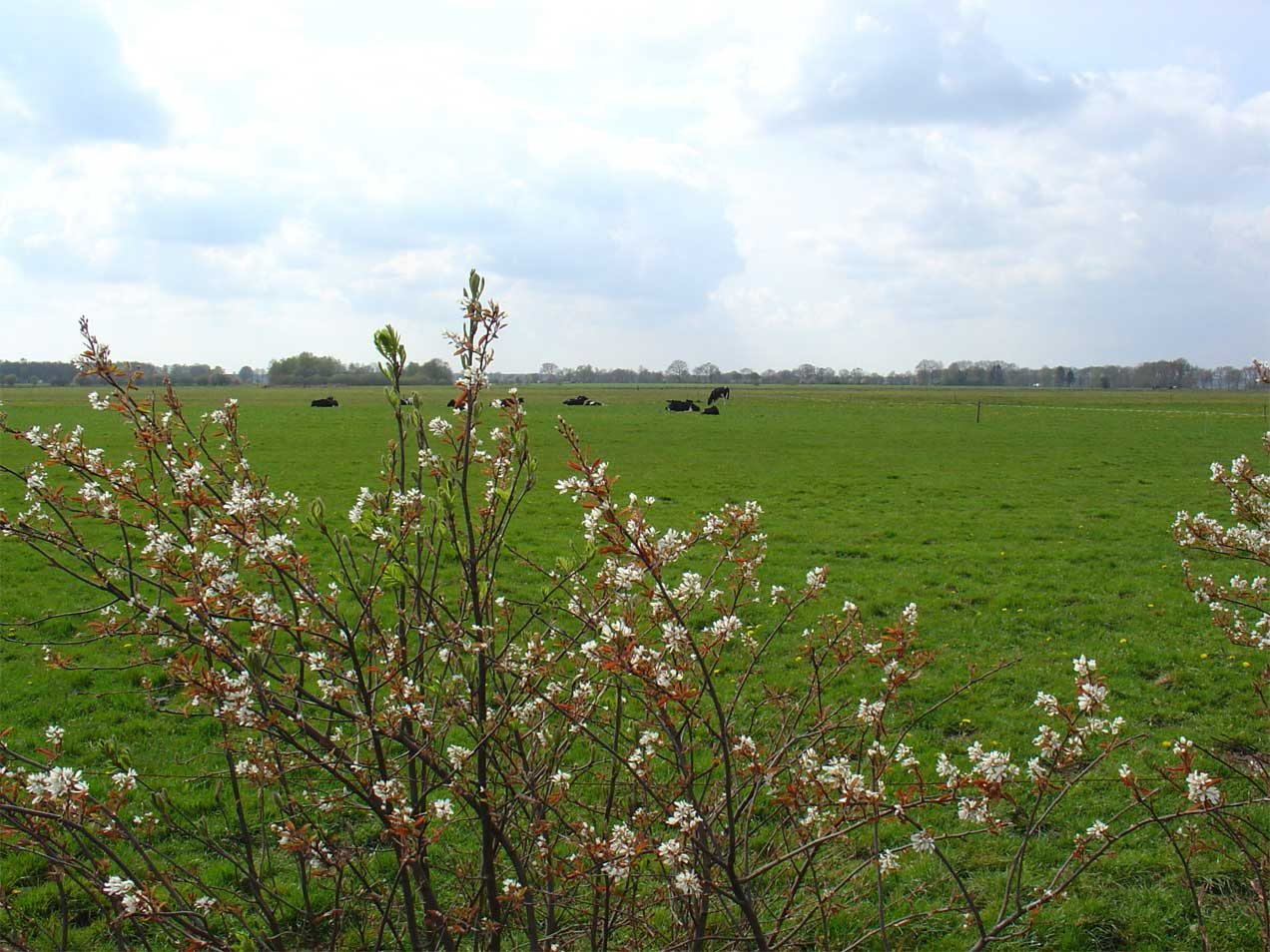
- Het Anserveld nabij Ansen

- Location in province of Drenthe in the Netherlands Ansen (Netherlands)
- Coordinates: 52°46′52″N 6°20′0″E
- Country: Netherlands
- Province: Drenthe
- Municipality: De Wolden

Area
  - Total: 8.87 km^{2} (3.42 sq mi)
- Elevation: 7 m (23 ft)

Population (2021)
  - Total: 350
  - Density: 39/km^{2} (100/sq mi)
- Time zone: UTC+1 (CET)
  - Summer (DST): UTC+2 (CEST)
- Postal code: 7964
- Dialing code: 0522

Ansen is a village in the Dutch province of Drenthe. It is in the municipality De Wolden, about 15 km northwest of the town of Hoogeveen. The music festival Vogelpop is hosted in Ansen.

== History ==
Ansen is an esdorp without a church which developed in the 12th century around a havezate which was demolished around 1800. It was first mentioned around 1232 as Anze. The etymology is unknown. In 1840, it was home to 167 people.

== Gallery ==
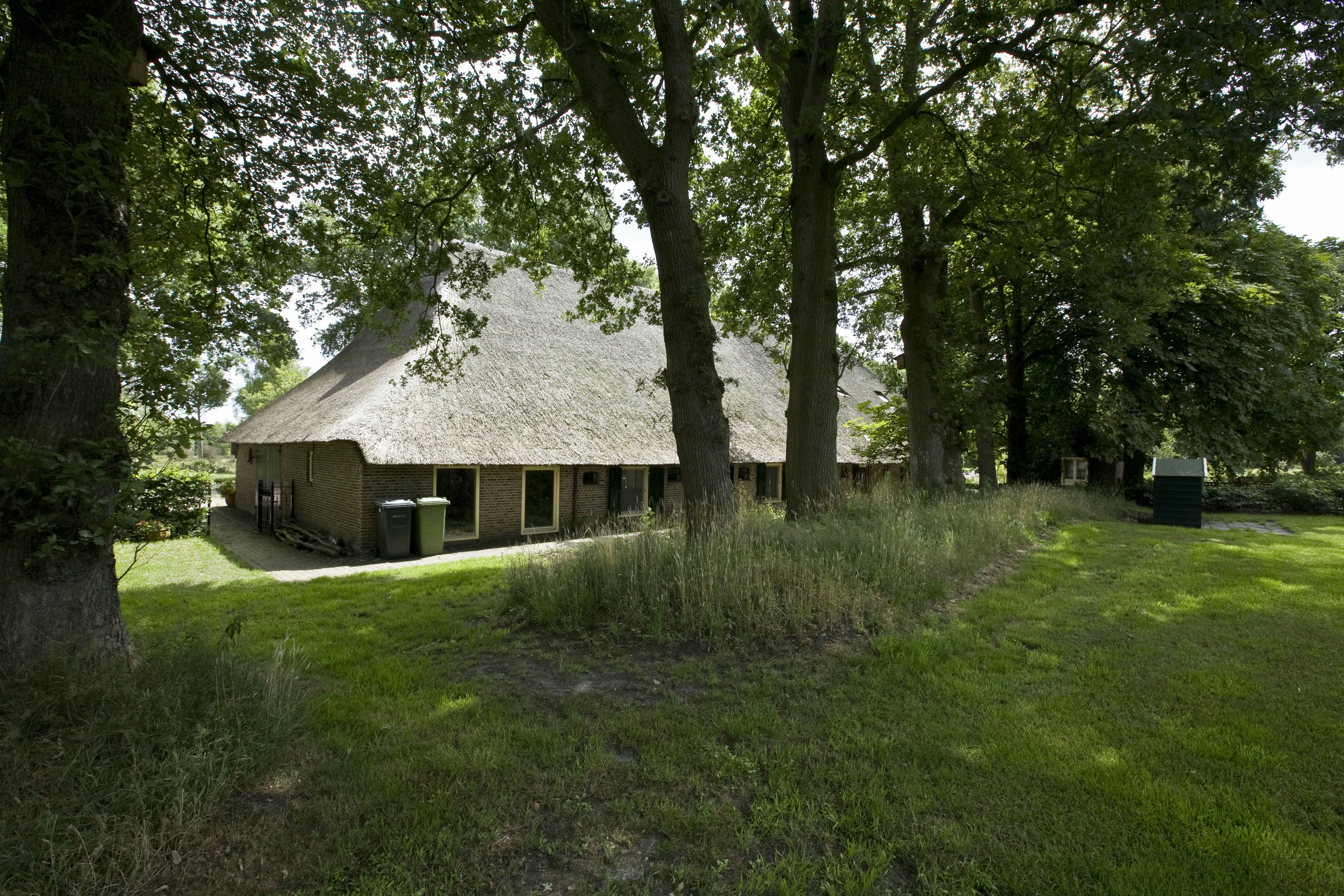
Farm in Ansen

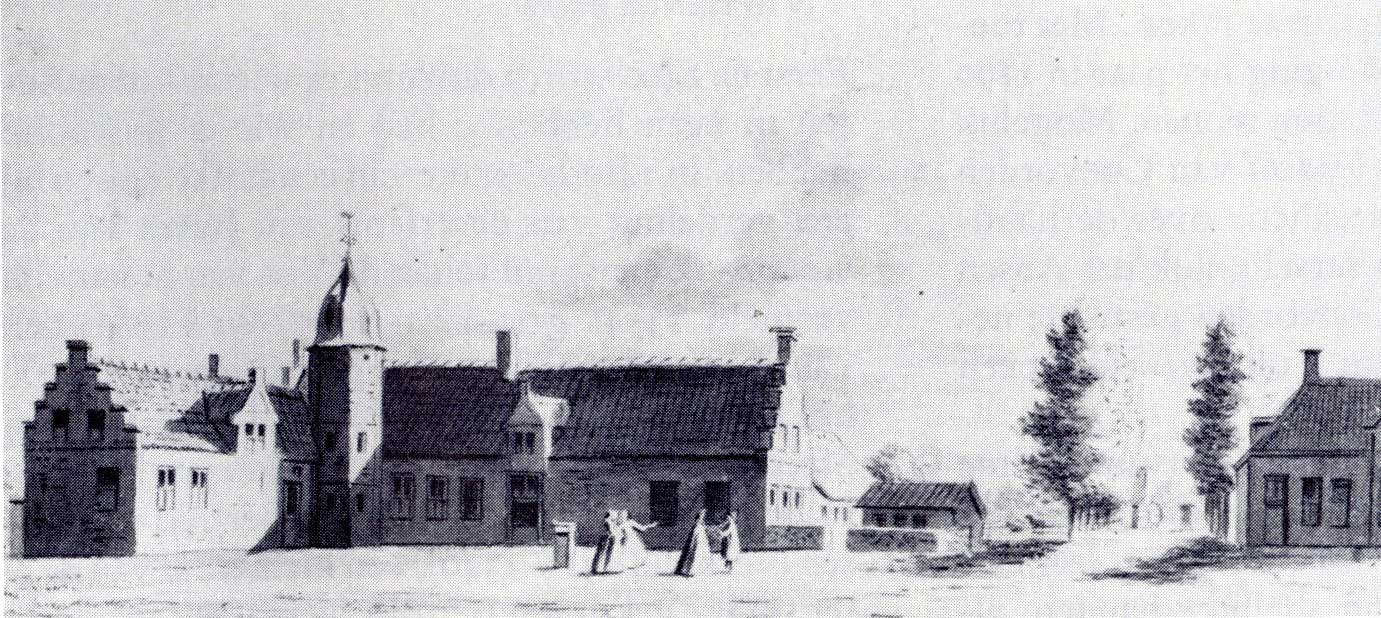
Drawing of the Ansen Estate (1732)
