= Anholt, Netherlands =

Anholt
- Hamlet
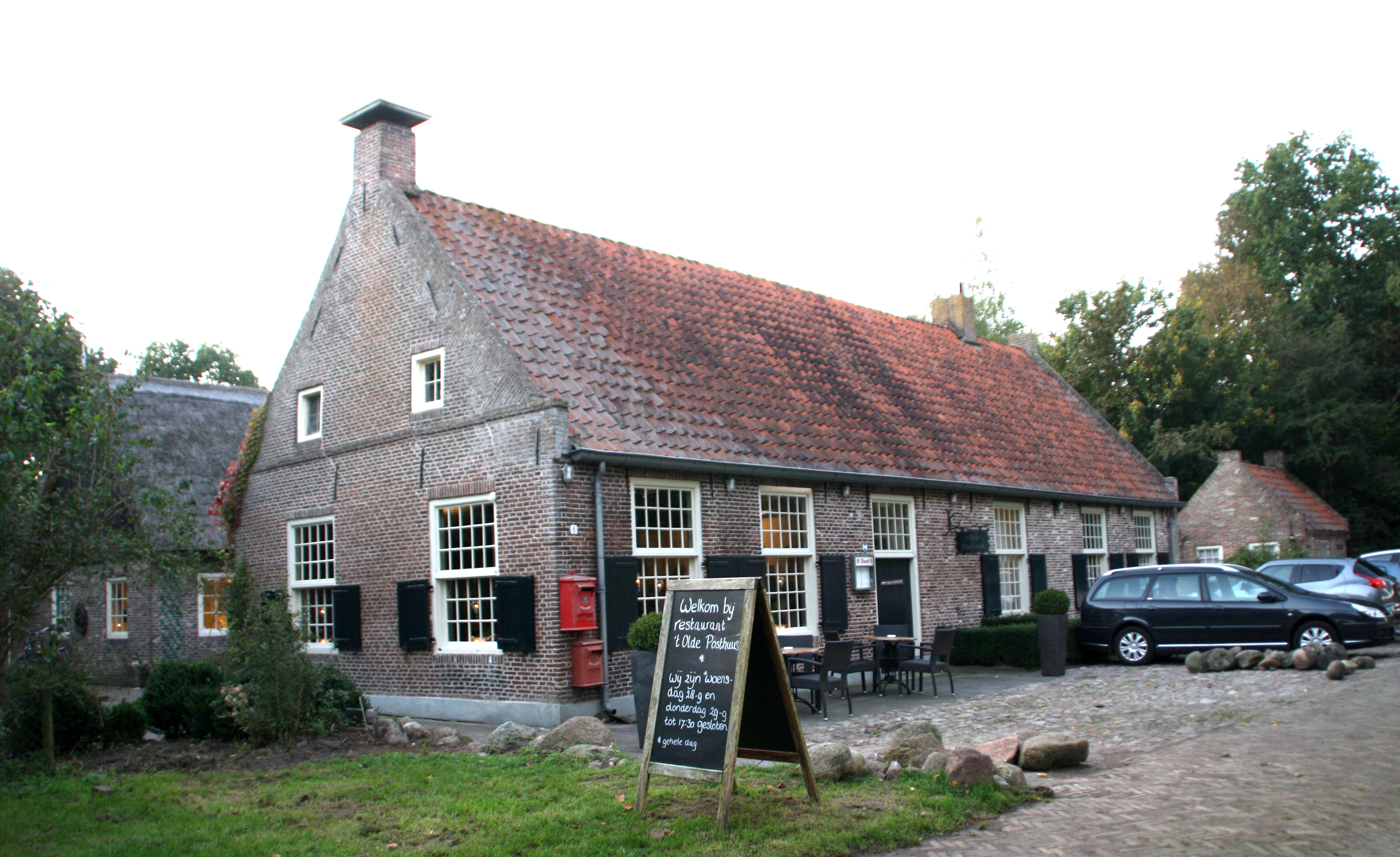
- Restaurant in Anholt

- Location in province of Drenthe in the Netherlands Anholt (Netherlands)
- Coordinates: 52°46′32″N 6°24′47″E
- Country: Netherlands
- Province: Drenthe
- Municipality: De Wolden
- Elevation: 13 m (43 ft)
- Time zone: UTC+1 (CET)
  - Summer (DST): UTC+2 (CEST)
- Postal code: 7933
- Dialing code: 0528

Anholt is a hamlet in northeast Netherlands. It is located in the municipality De Wolden, Drenthe, about 2 km west of Pesse.

According to the 19th-century historian A.J. van der Aa, it had about 20 inhabitants in the middle of the 19th century, and was also called "Anhalt". The postal authorities have placed it under Pesse. Nowadays, it has about 15 houses and 50 holiday homes.
