= Nolde, Netherlands =

Nolde
- Hamlet
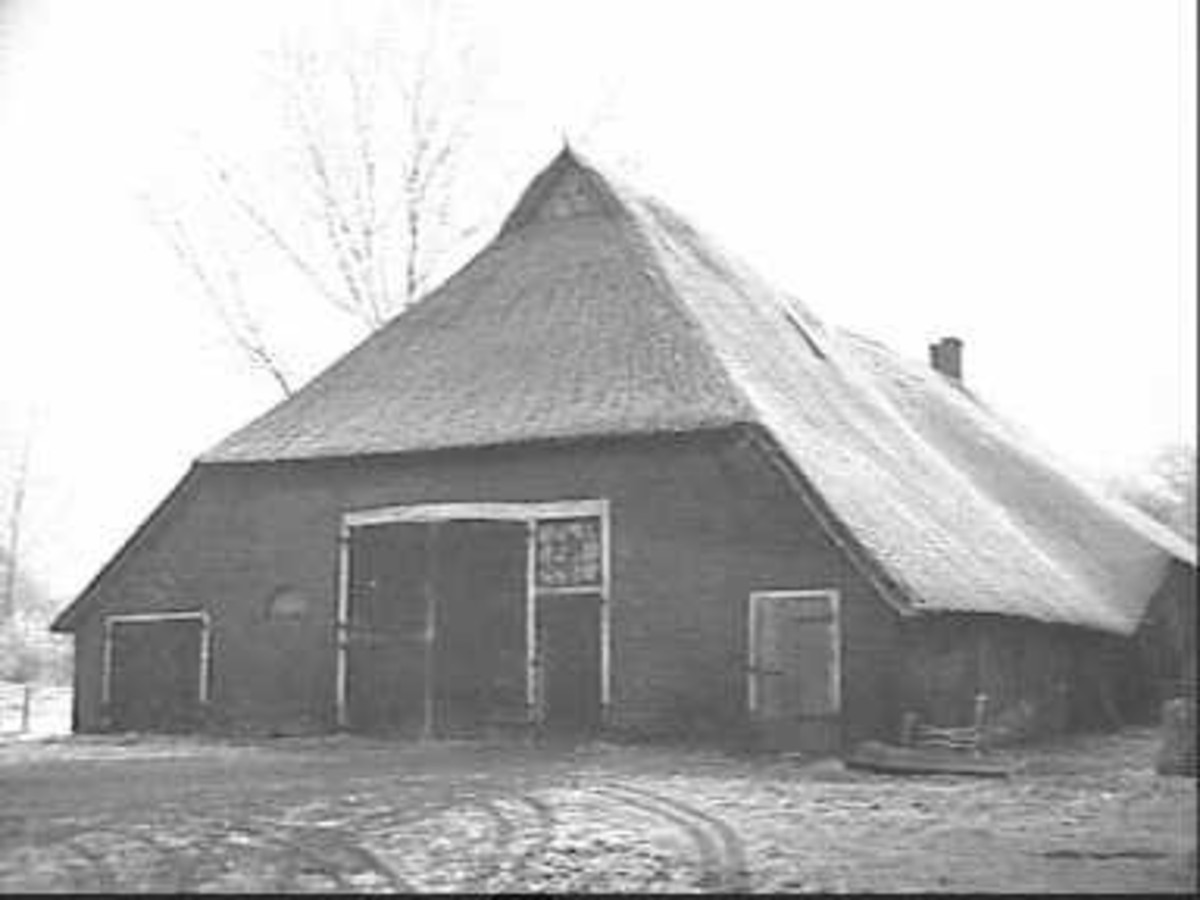
- Farm in Nolde

- Location in province of Drenthe in the Netherlands Nolde (Netherlands)
- Coordinates: 52°37′59″N 6°25′17″E
- Country: Netherlands
- Province: Drenthe
- Municipality: De Wolden
- Elevation: 8 m (26 ft)
- Time zone: UTC+1 (CET)
  - Summer (DST): UTC+2 (CEST)
- Postal code: 7925
- Dialing code: 0528

Nolde is a hamlet in the Dutch province of Drenthe. It is located in the municipality of De Wolden, about 4 km south of Zuidwolde. The postal authorities have placed it under Linde.
