= De Wolden =

- Municipality
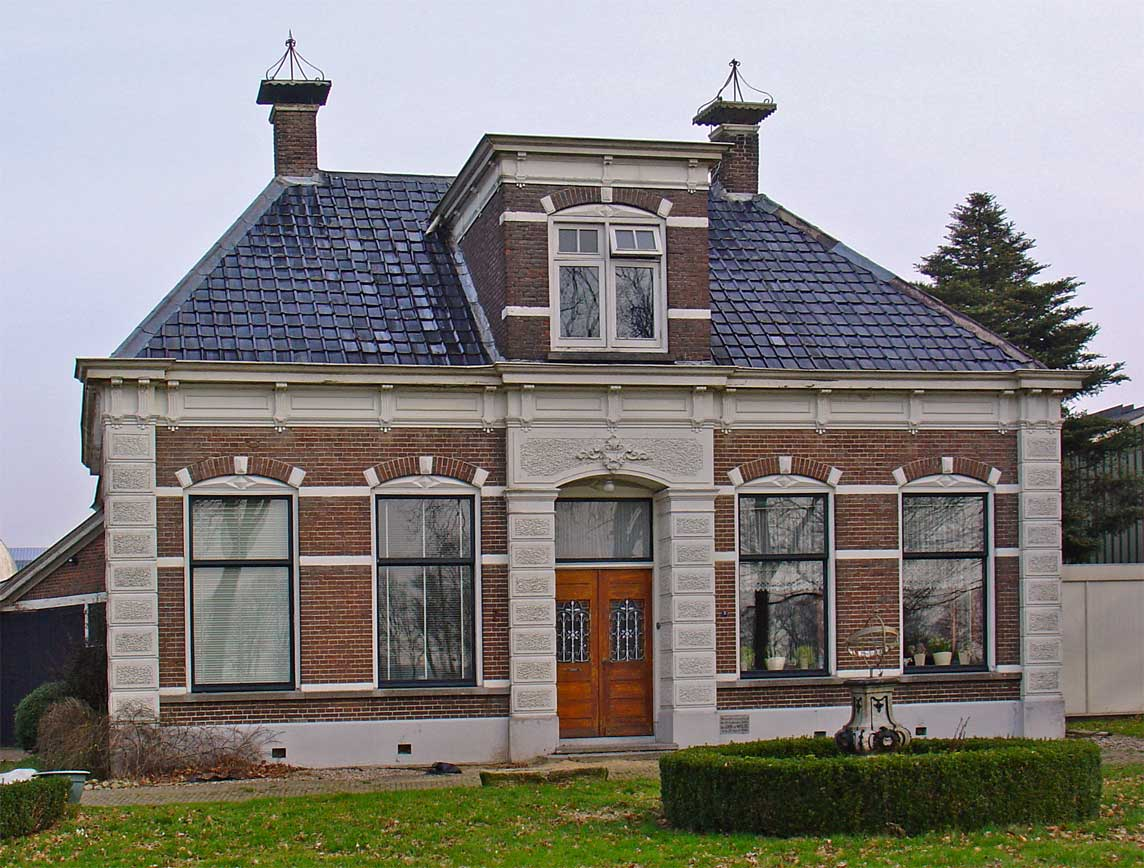
- Monumental farmhouse in De Wijk

- Flag Coat of arms

- Location in Drenthe
- Coordinates: 52°40′N 6°26′E
- Country: Netherlands
- Province: Drenthe
- Established: 1 January 1998

Government
  - Body: Municipal council
  - Mayor: Inge Nieuwenhuizen (VVD)

Area
  - Total: 226.35 km^{2} (87.39 sq mi)
  - Land: 224.55 km^{2} (86.70 sq mi)
  - Water: 1.80 km^{2} (0.69 sq mi)
- Elevation: 12 m (39 ft)

Population (January 2021)
  - Total: 24,374
  - Density: 109/km^{2} (280/sq mi)
- Time zone: UTC+1 (CET)
  - Summer (DST): UTC+2 (CEST)
- Postcode: Parts of 7900 range
- Area code: 0522, 0523, 0528
- Website: www.dewolden.nl

De Wolden (Dutch pronunciation: [də ˈʋɔldə(n)]) is a municipality in the northeastern Netherlands in the province of Drenthe.

== Population centres ==
- Alteveer
- Anholt
- Ansen
- Armweide
- Bazuin
- Benderse
- Berghuizen
- Blijdenstein
- Bloemberg
- Braamberg
- Buitenhuizen
- Bultinge
- Dijkhuizen
- Dickninge
- Drogt
- Drogteropslagen
- Dunnigen
- Echten
- Eemten
- Engeland
- Eursinge
- Fort
- Gijsselte
- Haakswold
- Haalweide
- Hees
- Hoge Linthorst
- Kerkenveld
- Koekange
- Koekangerveld
- Kraloo
- Leeuwte
- Linde
- Lubbinge
- Lunssloten
- Middelveen
- Nolde
- Oldenhave
- Oosteinde
- Oosterwijk
- Oshaar
- Oud Veeningen
- De Oude Tol
- Paardelanden
- Pieperij
- Rheebruggen
- Ruinen
- Ruinerweide
- Ruinerwold
- Schottershuizen
- Schrapveen
- De Stapel
- Steenbergen
- Struikberg
- De Stuw
- Ten Arlo
- De Tippe
- Veeningen
- Vuile Riete
- Weerwille
- Wemmenhove
- De Wijk
- Witteveen
- Zuidwolde

=== Topography ===
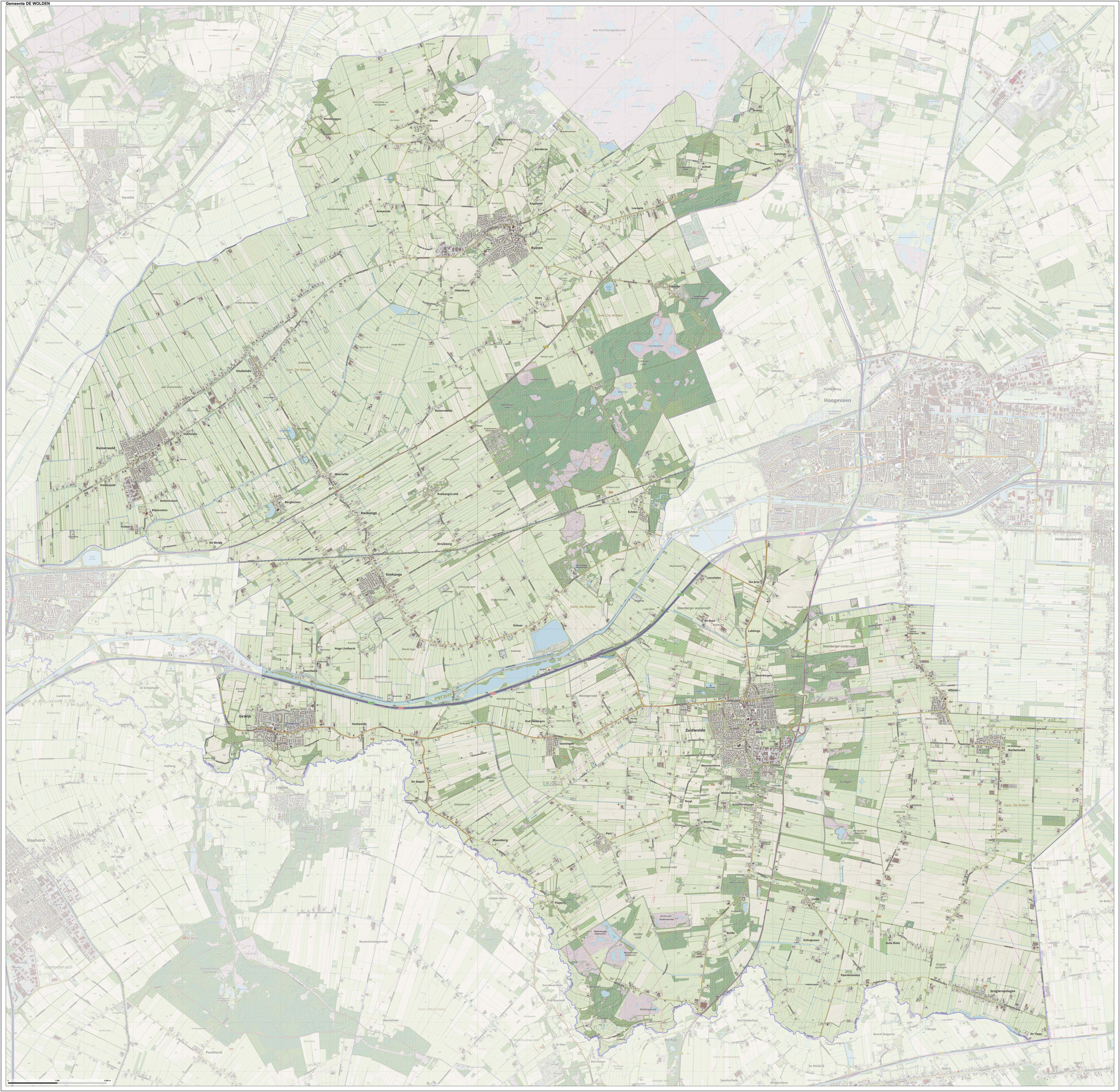

Dutch topographic map of the municipality of De Wolden, June 2015

== Notable people ==
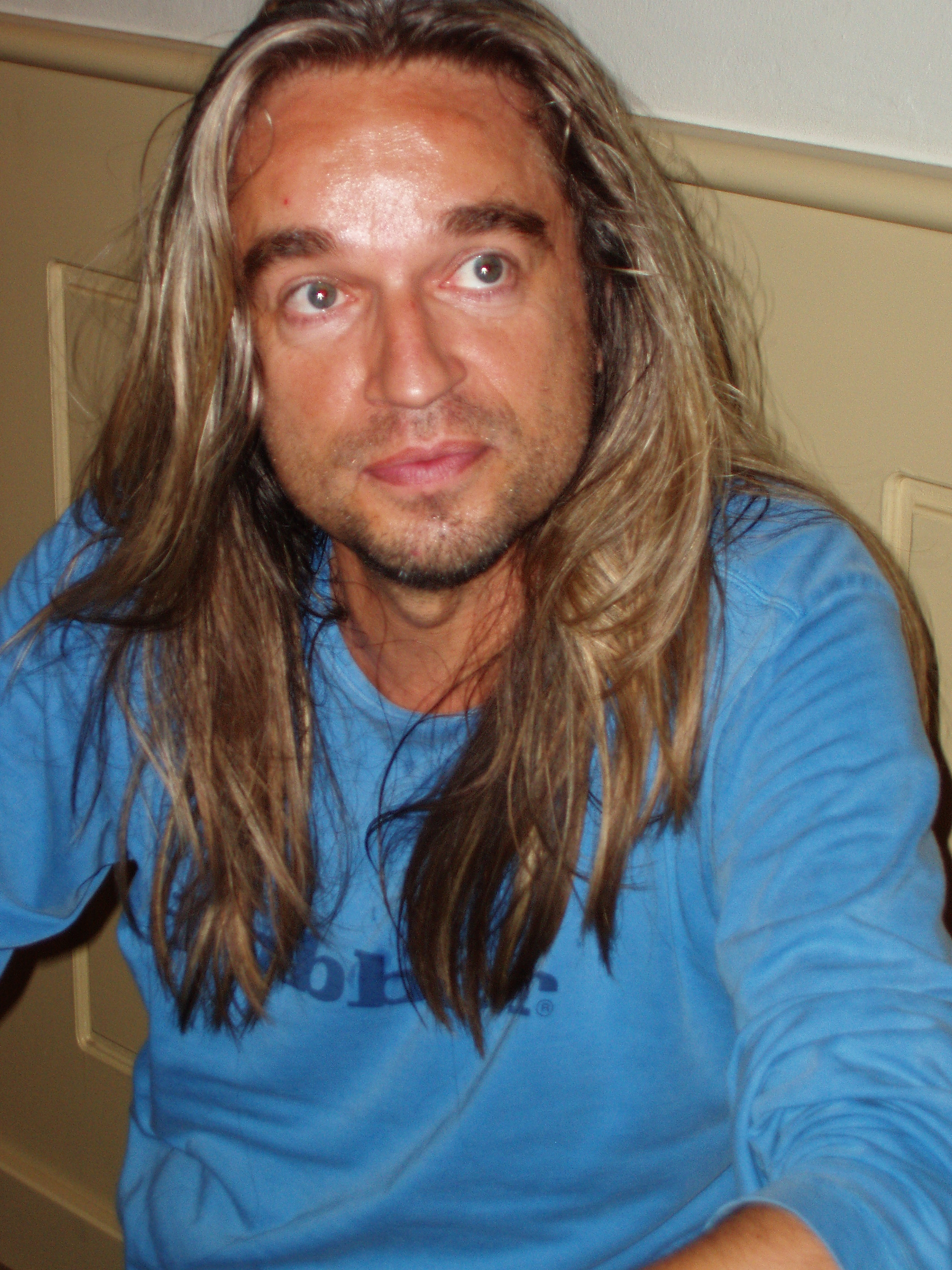
Jan Vayne, 2005

- Jan Evertsen Cloppenburgh (1571 in Ruinen – 1648) a Dutch publisher during the Dutch Golden Age
- Steven van Voorhees (1600 in Hees – 1684) an early Dutch settler in America
- Henrik Ruse, Baron of Rysensteen (1624 in Ruinen - 1679) a Dutch officer and fortification engineer
- Hendrikje Doelen (1784 in Oosterwijk – 1847) a Dutch serial killer
- Jan Arend Godert de Vos van Steenwijk II (1818 in De Wijk – 1905) a Dutch politician and president of the senate 1874/1880
- Jan Hendrik de Boer (1899 in Ruinen – 1971) a Dutch physicist and chemist
- Jan Vayne (1966 in Zuidwolde) a Dutch pianist
- Korie Homan (born 1986 in de Wijk) a Dutch former wheelchair tennis player and gold medallist at the 2008 Paralympics

== Gallery ==
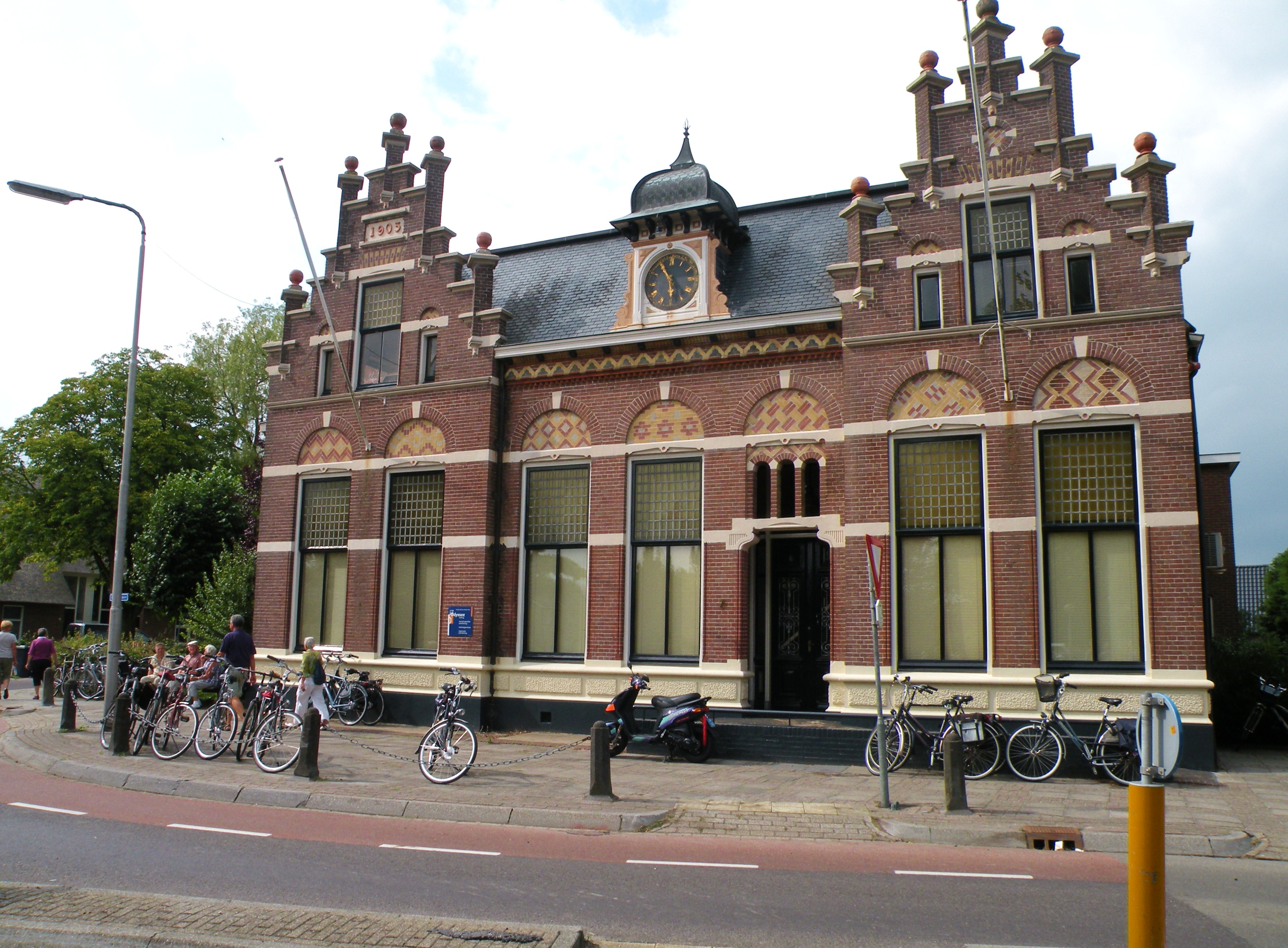
Oude gemeentehuis van Ruinerwold

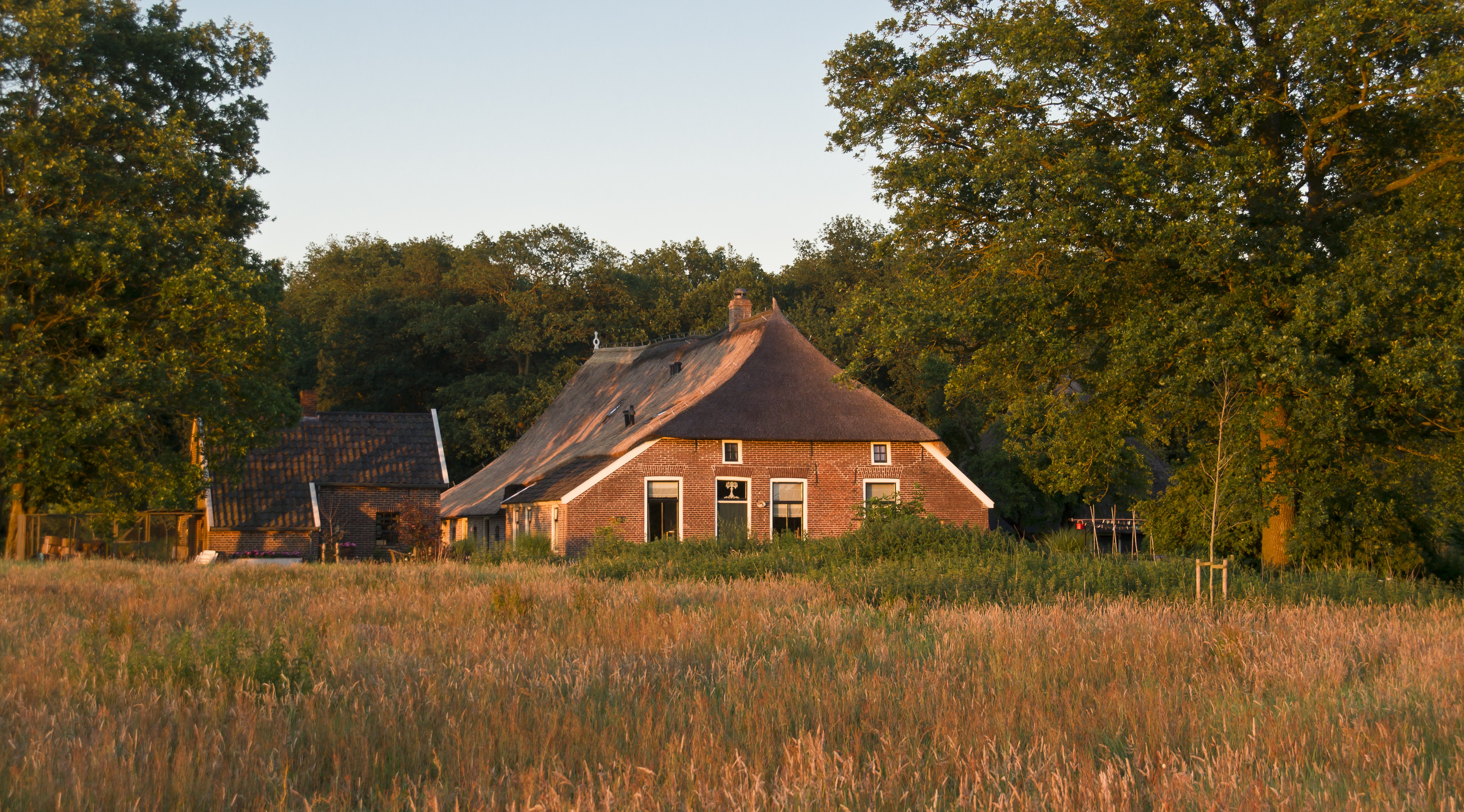
De Wildenberg at sunset, Zuidwolde

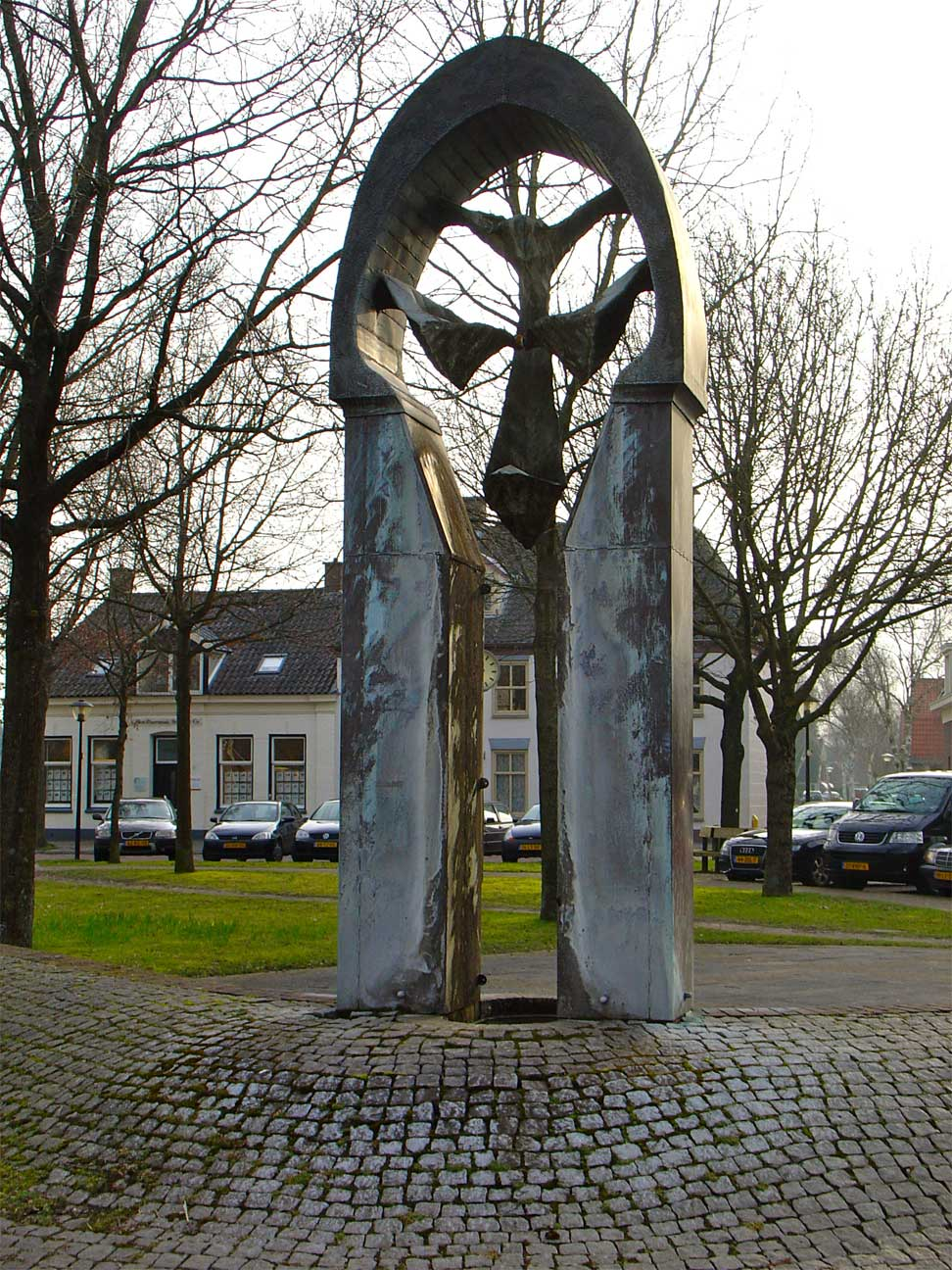
De Wieker Poort Onno de Ruijter

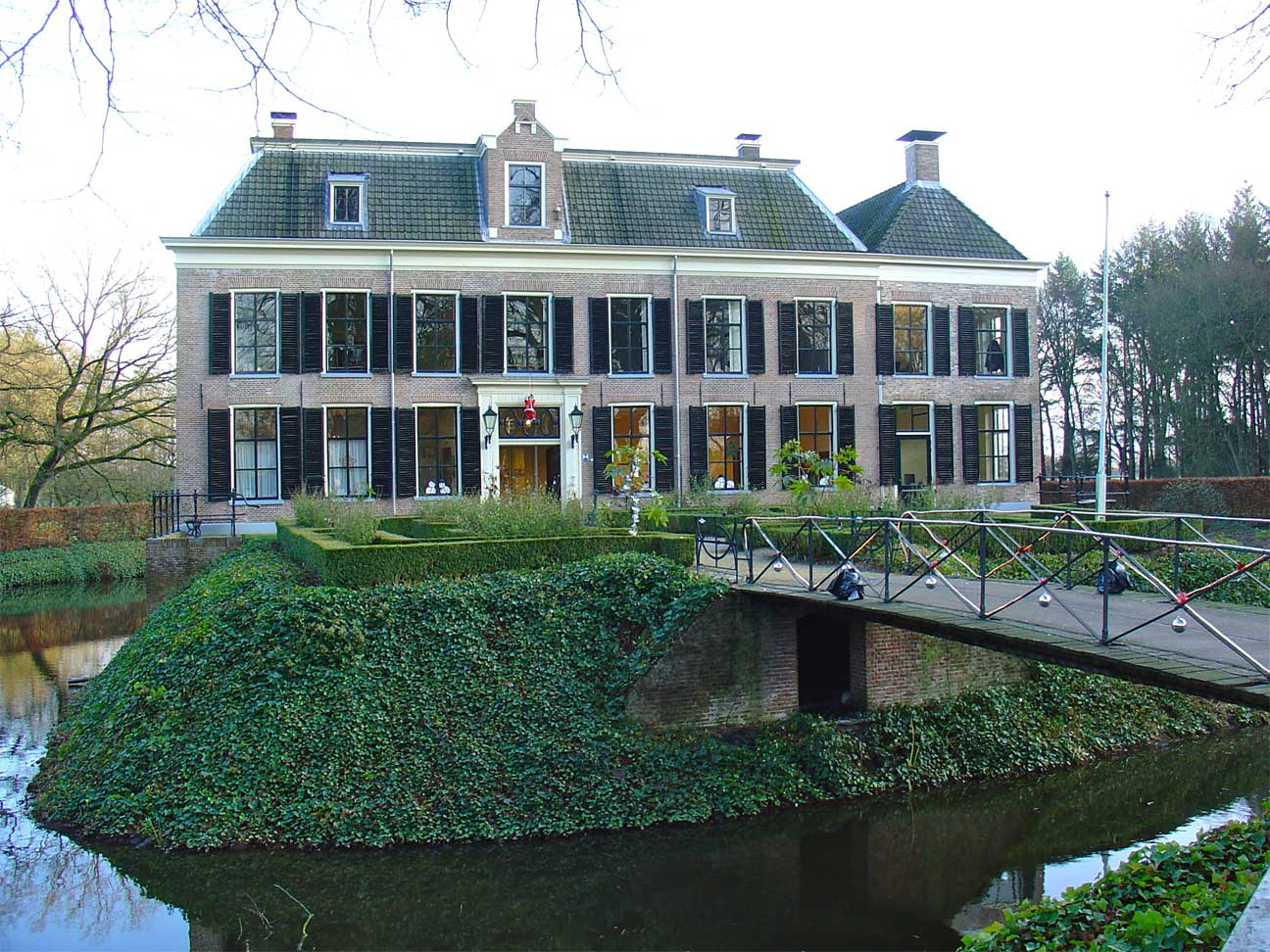
Huis te Echten
