= Alteveer, De Wolden =

Alteveer
- Village
- Location in province of Drenthe in the Netherlands Alteveer (Netherlands)
- Coordinates: 52°40′27″N 6°29′15″E
- Country: Netherlands
- Province: Drenthe
- Municipality: De Wolden

Area
  - Total: 5.73 km^{2} (2.21 sq mi)
- Elevation: 12 m (39 ft)

Population (2021)
  - Total: 810
  - Density: 140/km^{2} (370/sq mi)
- Time zone: UTC+1 (CET)
  - Summer (DST): UTC+2 (CEST)
- Postal code: 7927
- Dialing code: 0528

Alteveer is a village in the Dutch province of Drenthe. It is located in the municipality De Wolden, about 5 km south of the town of Hoogeveen.

It was first mentioned in 1656, and means "all too far", because of poor connections to the outside world. In 1840, it was home to 220 people. Nowadays Alteveer cooperates with nearby Kerkenveld. They have formed a twin village, but they are technically independent.

== External ==
- Joint website of Alteveer and Kerkenveld (in Dutch)
