= Ruinen =

- Village and former municipality
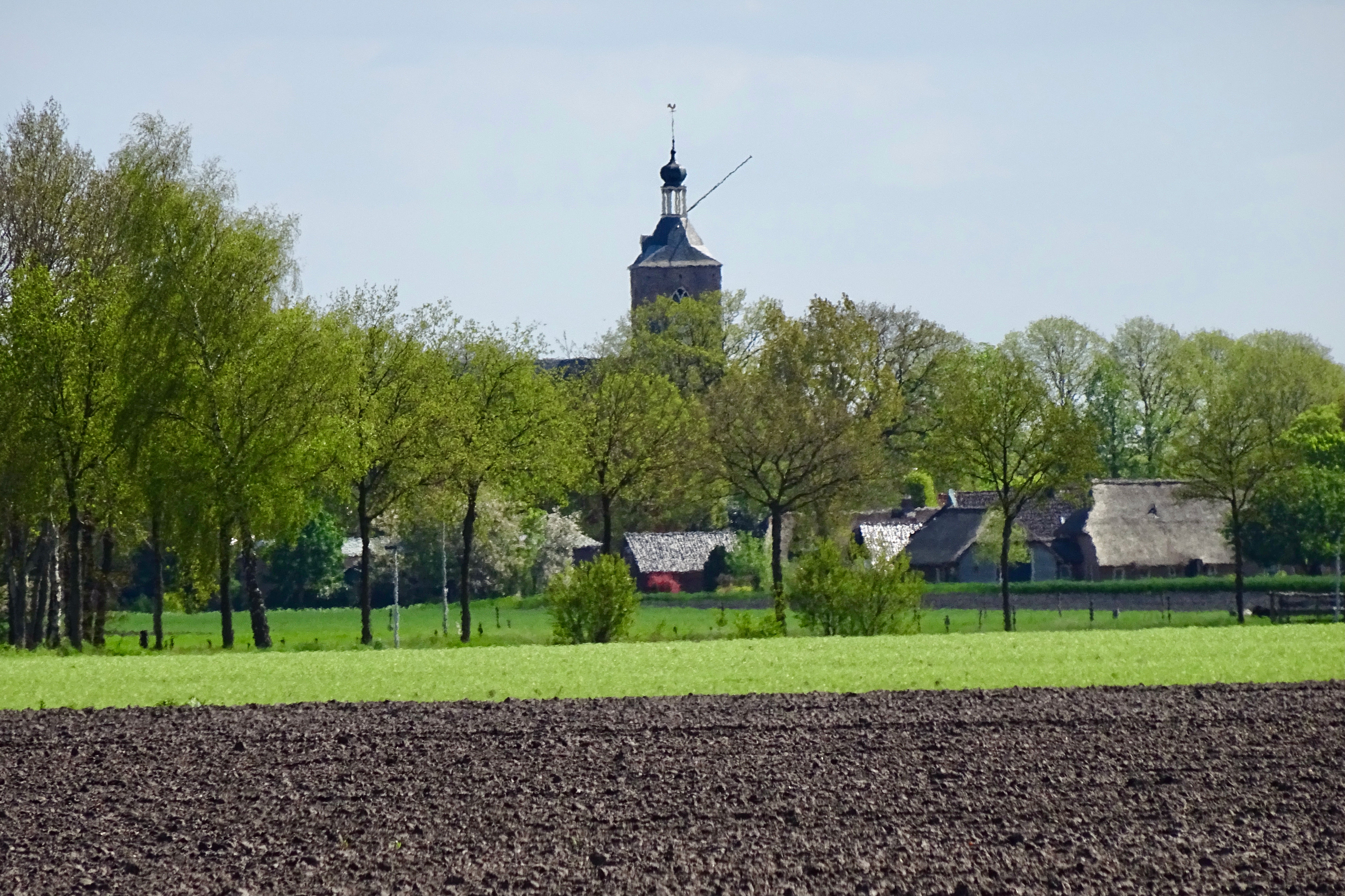
- View on Ruinen

- Flag Coat of arms
- Interactive map of Ruinen
- Coordinates: 52°45′48″N 6°21′23″E
- Country: Netherlands
- Province: Drenthe
- Municipality: De Wolden

Area
  - Total: 34.94 km^{2} (13.49 sq mi)
- Elevation: 8 m (26 ft)

Population (2021)
  - Total: 3,380
  - Density: 96.7/km^{2} (251/sq mi)
- Time zone: UTC+1 (CET)
  - Summer (DST): UTC+2 (CEST)
- Postal code: 7963
- Dialing code: 0522

Ruinen is a village in the Dutch province of Drenthe. It is located in the municipality of De Wolden, about 10 km northwest of Hoogeveen. The Dwingelderveld National Park is located near Ruinen.

== History ==
The village was first mentioned in 1139 as de Runa. The etymology is unknown. Ruinen is an esdorp from the Early Middle Ages. Around 1140, a double monastery of the Benedictines was founded in Ruinen, however they moved to De Wijk in 1325.

The Dutch Reformed church has been built in the 15th century replacing and reusing the monastery church of which dated from around 1140. The tower was built in 1423. The spire has been renewed in 1660 after it had been damaged by a storm, and the crown was replaced in 1952. Between 1972 and 1975, the church was restored to its original form before 1836.

Ruinen was home to 1,059 people in 1840. Ruinen was a separate municipality until 1998, when it became part of De Wolden. The windmill De Zaandplatte was rebuilt in 1964, and is open to the public.

== Notable residents ==
- Jan Hendrik de Boer (1899–1971), a physicist and chemist.
- Sione Jongstra (born 1976), a Dutch triathlete

== Gallery ==
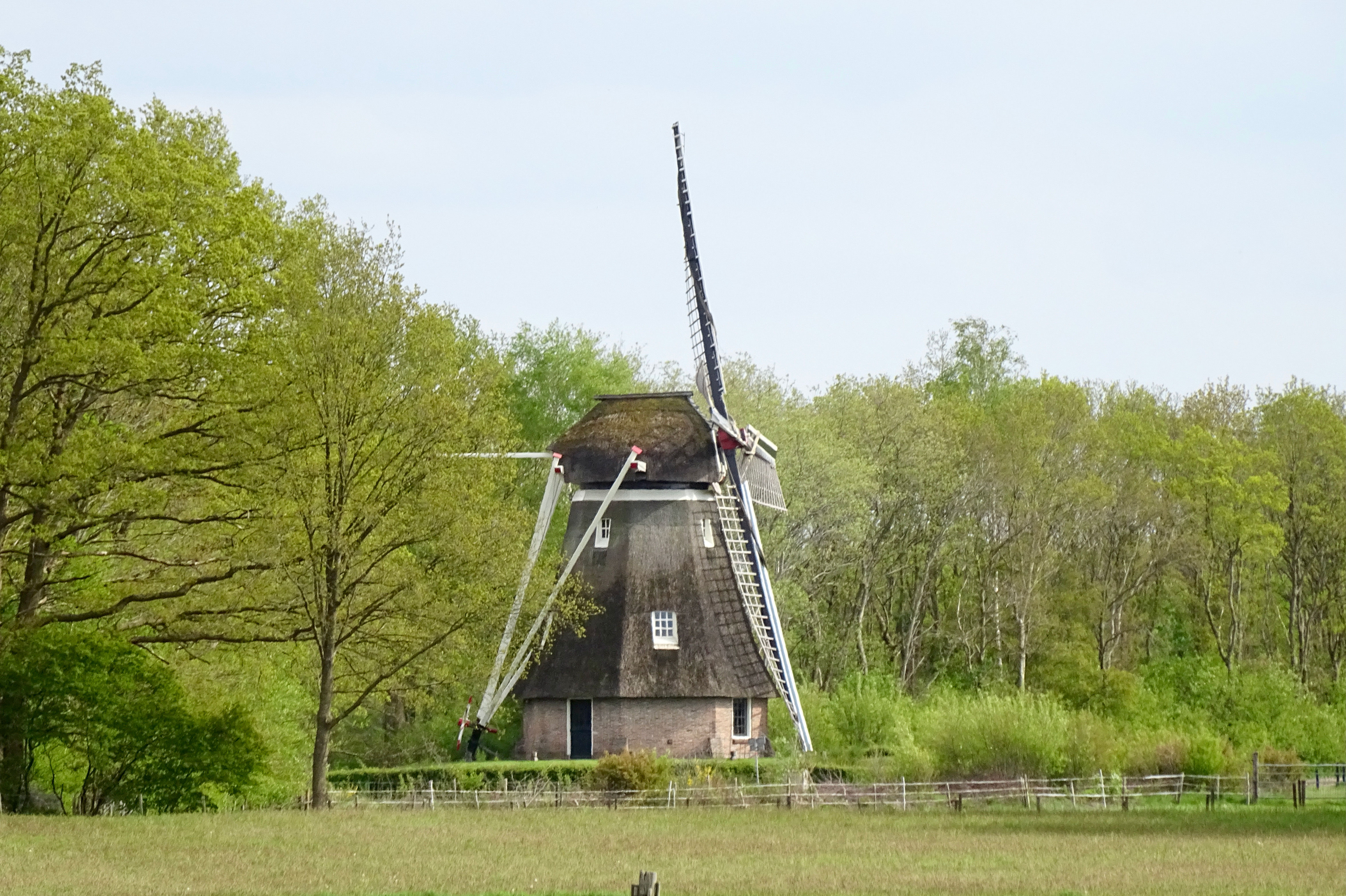
The Zaandplatte windmill

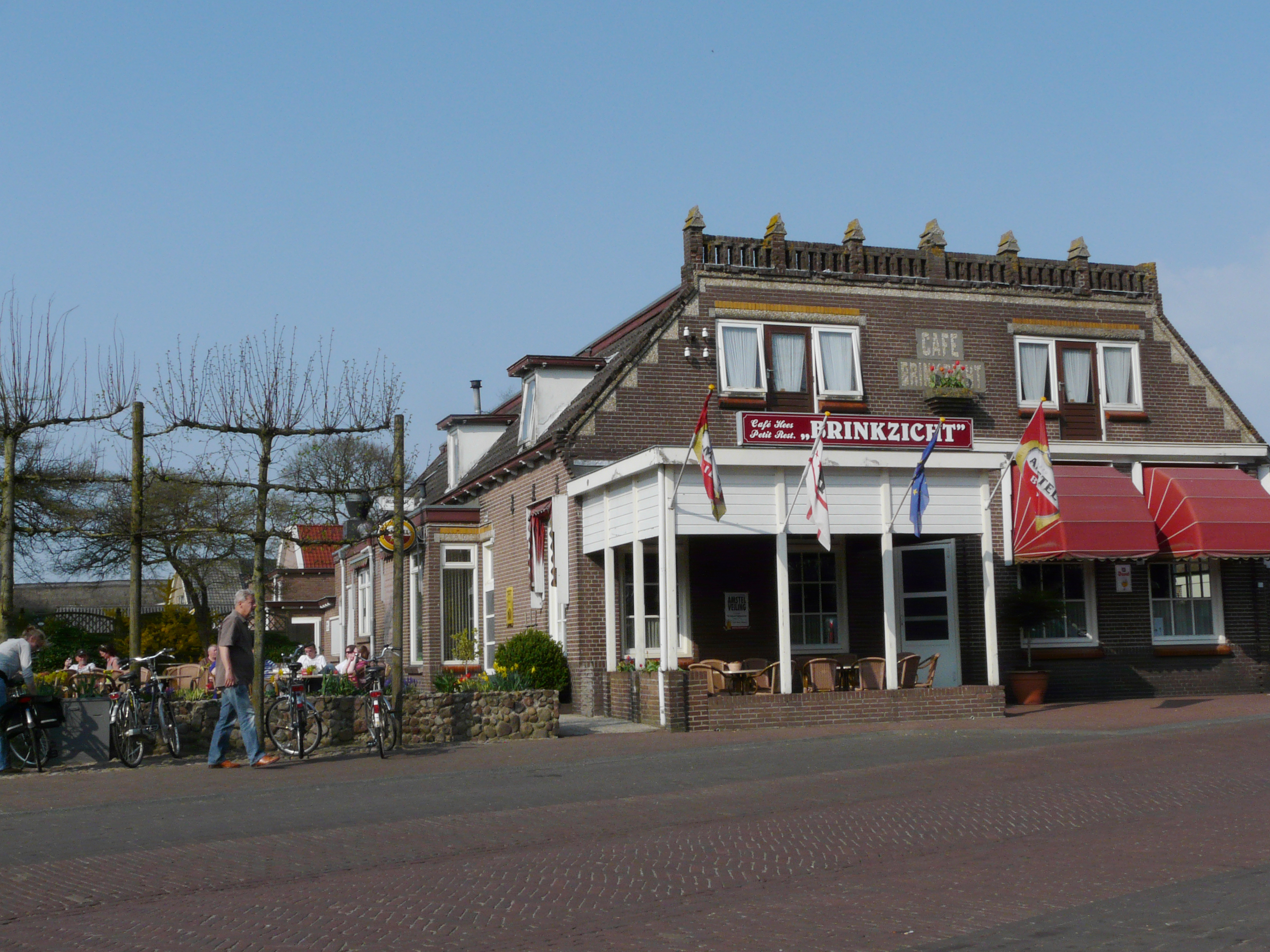
Bar Brinkzicht

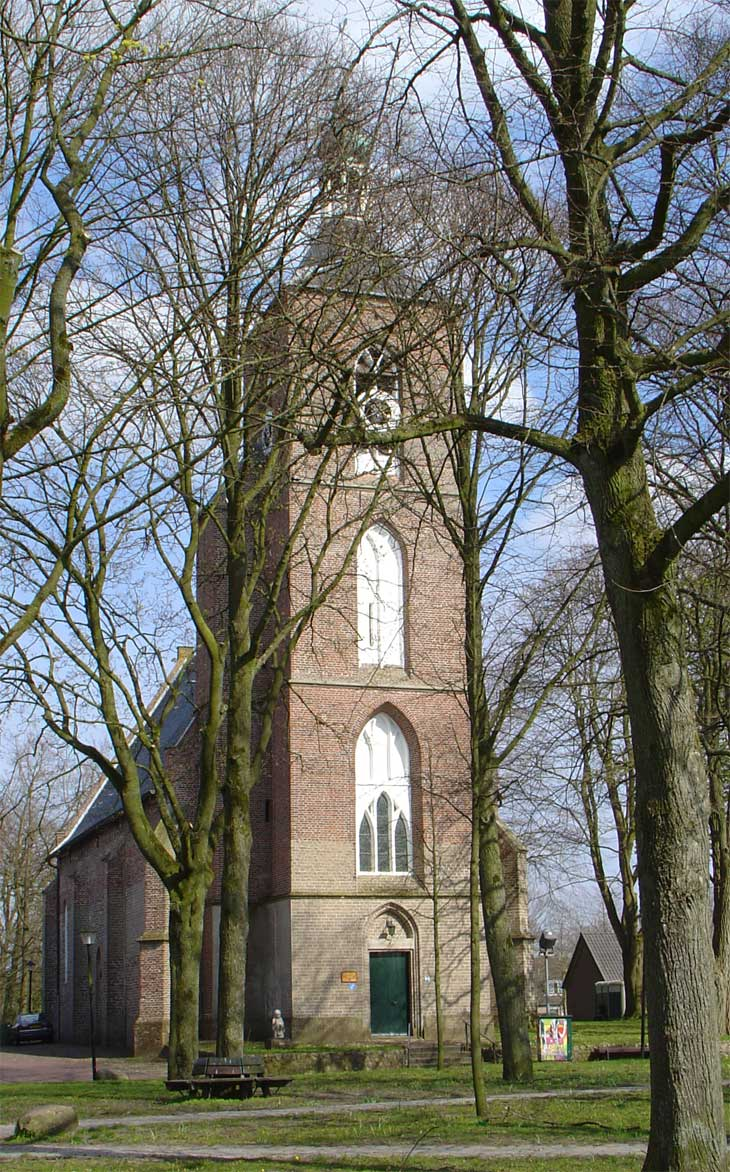
Church in Ruinen

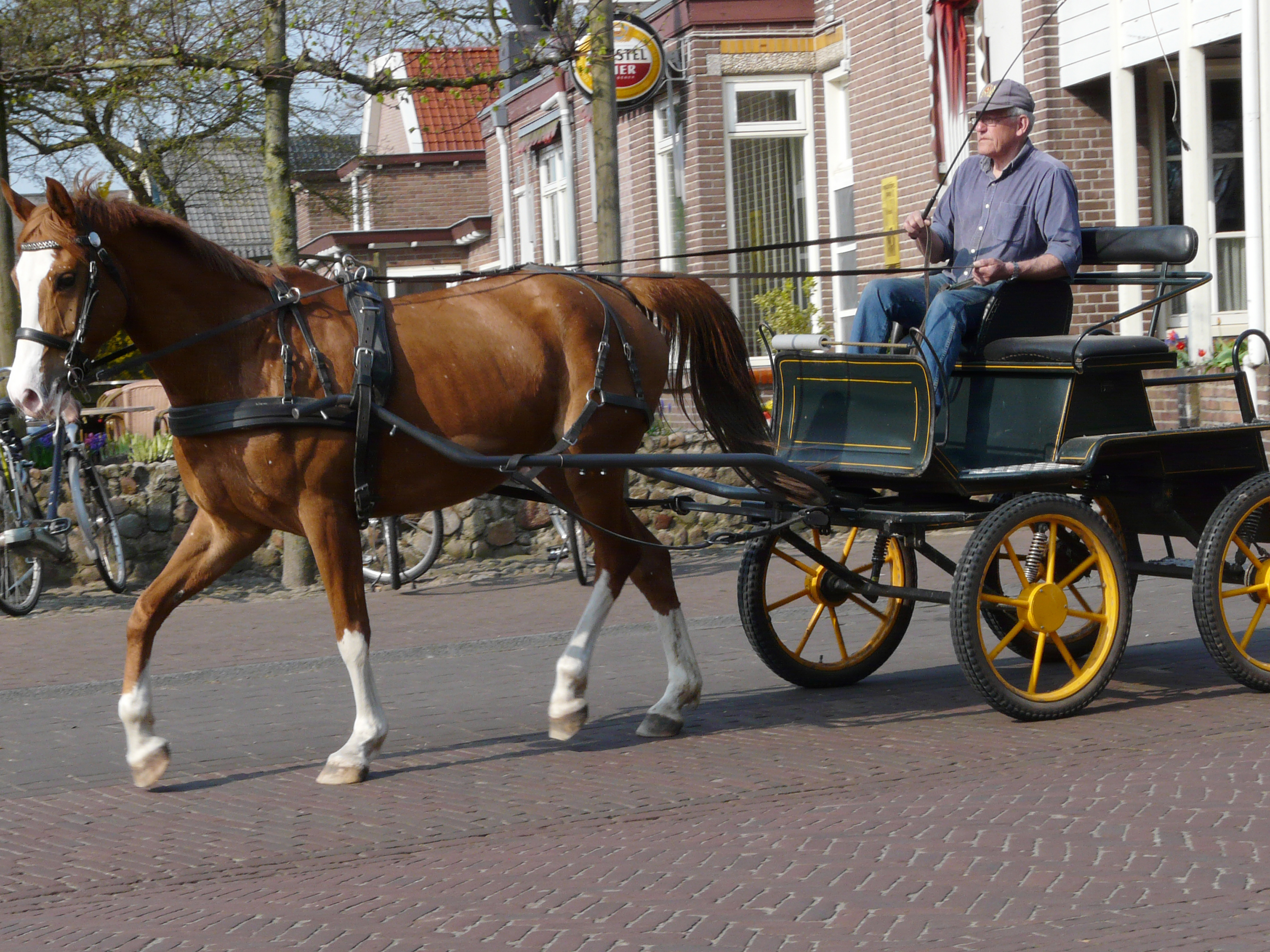
Horse and carriage
