= Koekange =

- Village
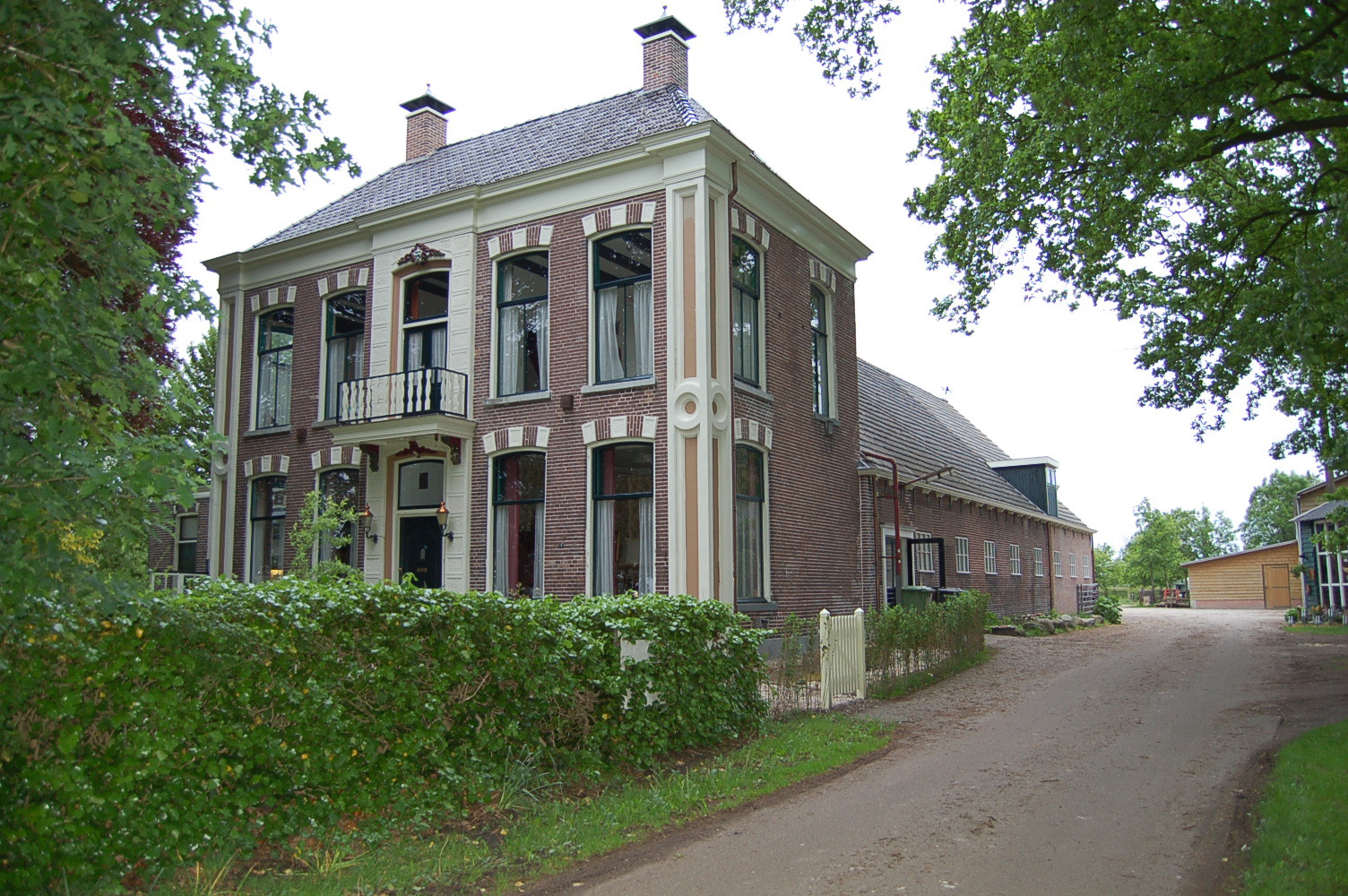
- Welgelegen in Koekange

- Location in province of Drenthe in the Netherlands Koekange (Netherlands)
- Coordinates: 52.6980°N 6.3151°E
- Country: Netherlands
- Province: Drenthe
- Municipality: De Wolden

Area
  - Total: 26.15 km^{2} (10.10 sq mi)
- Elevation: 3 m (9.8 ft)

Population (2021)
  - Total: 2,495
  - Density: 95.41/km^{2} (247.1/sq mi)
- Time zone: UTC+1 (CET)
  - Summer (DST): UTC+2 (CEST)
- Postal code: 7958
- Dialing code: 0522

Koekange is a village in the De Wolden municipality of the province of Drenthe, Netherlands.

== History ==
Koekange was founded by the heer of Echten to excavate the peat. It was first mentioned in 1290 as Kukange, and refers to Cockaigne, the mythical land of plenty. It was a road village on the dike along the Koekanger Aa. The first church was built in 1331, and was replaced by a new church in 1834. In 1840, there were 243 people living in the southern village and 263 in the northern village. The two parts merged into a single settlement. In 1870, it was once again split into two due to the construction of the Meppel–Groningen railway. A railway station was opened in 1870, but closed again in 1940.
