= List of Rijksmonuments in Drenthe =

This is a list of notable Rijksmonuments in Drenthe which have articles on the English Wikipedia. They are listed by municipality.

== Aa en Hunze ==
| Rijksmonument | Type | Location | Description | Photo |
|---|---|---|---|---|
| De Eendracht | Windmill | Gieterveen | A tower mill built in 1904, restored to working order. | |
| Molen van Rolde | Windmill | Rolde | A smock mill built in 1873, restored to working order. | |

== Coevorden ==
| Rijksmonument | Type | Location | Description | Photo |
|---|---|---|---|---|
| Albertdina | Windmill | Noord-Sleen | A smock mill built in 1906 and restored to working order. | |
| De Arend | Windmill | Coevorden | A smock mill built in 1894. | |
| De Bente | Windmill | Dalen | A smock mill built in 1814, restored to working order. | |
| De Hoop | Windmill | Sleen | A smock mill built in 1914, restored to working order. | |
| De Hoop | Windmill | Wachtum | A smock mill built in 1894, restored to working order. | |
| Jantina Hellingmolen | Windmill | Aalden | A smock mill built in 1891, restored to working order. | |
| Molen van Schoonoord | Windmill | Schoonoord | A smock mill built in 1903, converted to residential accommodation | |

== De Wolden ==
| Rijksmonument | Type | Location | Description | Photo |
|---|---|---|---|---|
| De Vlijt | Windmill | Zuidwolde | A smock mill built in 1878 | |
| De Wieker Meule | Windmill | De Wijk | A smock mill built in 1829, restored to working order. | |
| De Zaandplatte | Windmill | Ruinen | A smock mill built in 1964, restored to working order. | |

== Emmen ==
| Rijksmonument | Type | Location | Description | Photo |
|---|---|---|---|---|
| De Heidebloem | Windmill | Erica | A smock mill built in 1897. Restored to working order and used to train new millers. | |
| Grenzicht | Windmill | Emmer-Compascuum | A smock mill built in 1907. | |
| Nooitgedacht | Windmill | Veenoord | A smock mill built in 1916, restored to working order. | |
| Zeldenrust | Windmill | Zuidbarge | A corn mill built in 1857. Restored to working order. | |

== Hogeveen ==
| Rijksmonument | Type | Location | Description | Photo |
|---|---|---|---|---|
| De Zwaluw | Windmill | Hoogeveen | A smock mill built in 1834 which is working commercially. | |

== Meppel ==
| Rijksmonument | Type | Location | Description | Photo |
|---|---|---|---|---|
| De Sterrenberg | Windmill | Nijeveen | A smock mill built in 1977. In working order. | |
| De Weert | Windmill | Meppel | A smock mill built in 1998 on the base of a mill dating from 1807. Used to train new millers. | |

== Midden-Drenthe ==
| Rijksmonument | Type | Location | Description | Photo |
|---|---|---|---|---|
| Molen van Makkum | Windmill | Makkum | A smock mill built in 1906, restored to working order. | |

== Nordenveld ==
| Rijksmonument | Type | Location | Description | Photo |
|---|---|---|---|---|
| De Hoop | Windmill | Norg | A smock mill built in 1857. Restored to working order. The only windmill in the Netherlands equipped with Bilau sails. | |
| Noordenveld | Windmill | Norg | A smock mill built in 1878, restored to working order. | |
| Woldzigt | Windmill | Roderwolde | A corn and oil mill built in 1852. Restored to working order. | |

== Tynaarlo ==
| Rijksmonument | Type | Location | Description | Photo |
|---|---|---|---|---|
| De Boezemvriend | Windmill | De Groeve | A smock mill built in 1871, restored to working order. | |
| De Wachter | Windmill | Zuidlaren | A smock mill built in 1851, restored to working order. | |
| De Zwaluw | Windmill | Oudemolen | A smock mill built in 1837 which has been restored to working order. | |
| Tjasker Meestersveen | Tjasker | Zeijen | A Tjasker rebuilt in 1983. | |

== Westerveld ==
| Rijksmonument | Type | Location | Description | Photo |
|---|---|---|---|---|
| De Vlijt | Windmill | Diever | A smock mill built in 1882. | |
| Havelter Molen | Windmill | Havelte | A smock mill built in 1914, restored to working order. | |
| Molen van Vledder | Windmill | Vledder | A smock mill built in 1968, used as a holiday home | |
