= De Boezemvriend =

De Boezemvriend may refer to:

- De Boezemvriend (windmill)
- De Boezemvriend (film) -a 1982 Dutch film
