= Noordenveld, Norg =

Windmill in Norg, Netherlands

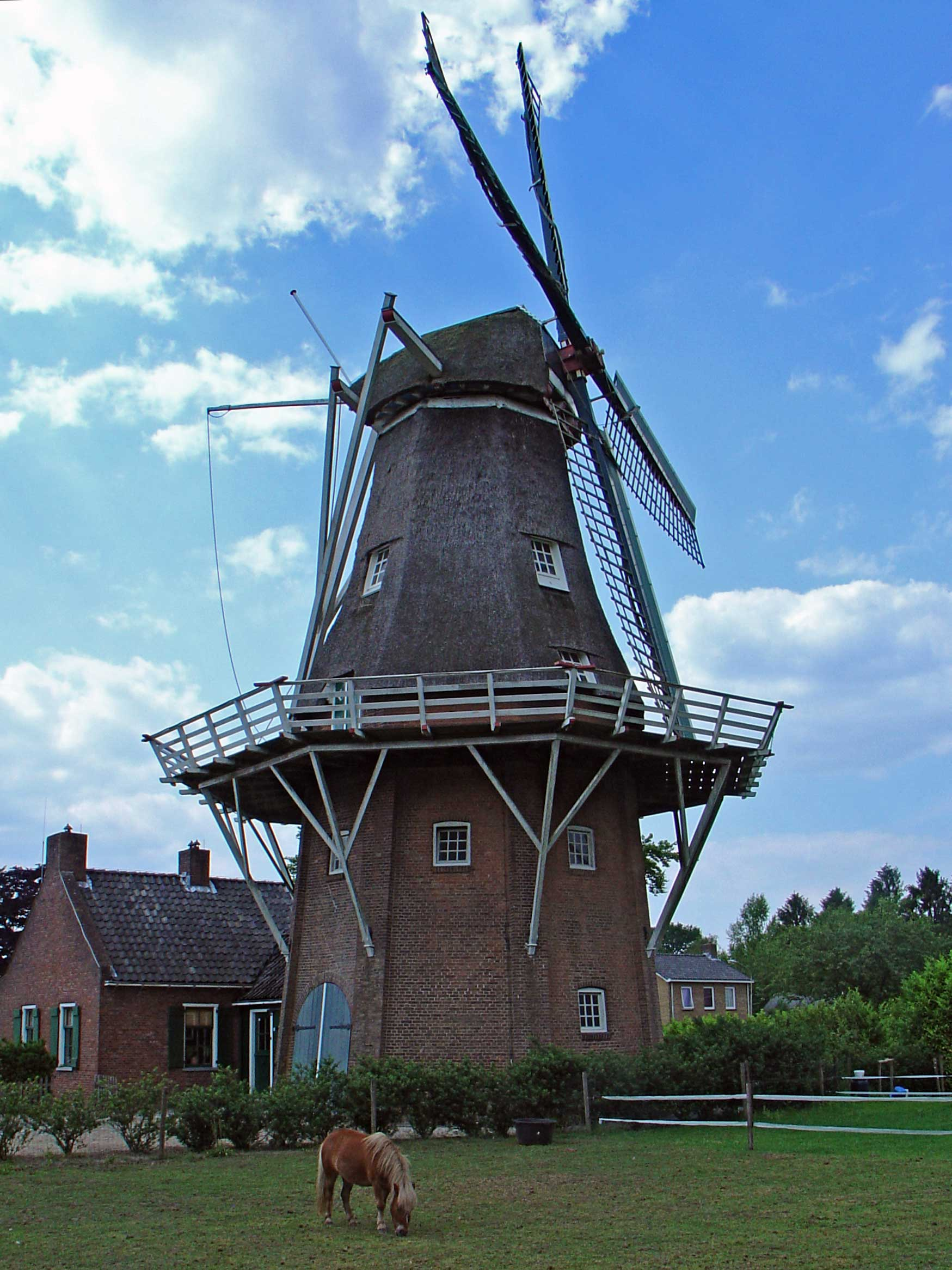
- Noordenveld, June 2008
- Interactive map of Noordenveld, Norg

Origin
- Mill name: Noordenveld
- Mill location: Westeind 16, 9331 CB, Norg
- Coordinates: 53°03′44″N 6°27′32″E
- Operator: Private
- Year built: 1878

Information
- Purpose: Corn mill
- Type: Smock mill
- Storeys: Two-storey smock
- Base storeys: Three-storey base
- Smock sides: Eight sides
- No. of sails: Four sails
- Type of sails: Common sails
- Windshaft: Cast iron
- Winding: Tailpole and winch
- No. of pairs of millstones: Two pairs
- Size of millstones: One pair Cullen stone 1.40 metres (4 ft 7 in) diameter

Noordenveld is a smock mill in Norg, Drenthe, the Netherlands. It was built in 1878 and is listed as a Rijksmonument, number 30785.

== History ==
Noordenveld was built in 1878 for Willem Stevens. The millwright was J Rietsma of Zeijerveld. In 1899, the mill came into the possession of Geert Stevens, brother of Willem. It passed to his nephew Jannes Stevens in 1930. He hired the mill out, firstly to Roelof Bosman, then Jente Venema, the Enting brothers and finally to a Co-operative Society. In 1946, four new sails were fitted by millwright Dijk of Leek. The mill had been reduced to working on two sails by this date. Photographs show that the mill was equipped with Patent sails at one time.

In 1962, the Nijhof family of Haren, Groningen bought the mill and restored it. The base was used as a living accommodation until 1973, when a new house was built adjoining the mill. During this time, the condition of the mill deteriorated, and it was no longer in working order. The mill was restored in 1990, but by then, nearby trees were robbing the mill of wind. They were cut down in 1998. In that year, the mill was sold to Jan Doorenbos. A new entrance was made to the mill so that visitors did not have to enter through the house. In 2002 the mill was equipped with two pairs of millstones, restoring it to its pre-1962 condition.

== Description ==
Noordenveld is what the Dutch describe as an "achtkante stellingmolen". It is a two-storey smock mill on a three-storey brick base. The stage is at second-floor level, 7.00 metres (23 ft 0 in) above ground level. The smock and cap are thatched. The mill is winded by a tailpole and winch. The four Common sails have a span of 19.20 metres (63 ft 0 in) are carried in a cast-iron windshaft, which was cast by Fabrikaat Muinck-Keizer of Martenshoek, Groningen in 1904. The windshaft was originally cast solid and had to be bored through to take Patent sails at a later date; this was probably the work of a millwright called Rolde. The windshaft also carries the brake wheel, which has 55 cogs. The brake wheel drives the wallower (30 cogs) at the top of the upright shaft. At the bottom of the upright shaft the great spur wheel, which has 86 cogs, drives the 1.40 metres (4 ft 7 in) diameter Cullen millstones and the French Burr millstones via lantern pinion stone nuts which have 27 staves each.

== Millers ==
- Willem Stevens 1878-99
- Geert Stevens 1899-1930
- Roelof Bosman 1930-
- Jente Veenma
- Enting brothers
- Co-operative Society

Reference for above:-

== Public access ==
Noordenveld is open on Saturdays from 11:00 to 16:00, alternating with De Hoop, the other windmill in Norg.
