= Jan Britstra =

Dutch hurdler

Personal information
- Nationality: Dutch
- Born: 10 April 1905 Norg, Netherlands
- Died: 7 March 1987 (aged 81)

Sport
- Sport: Track and field
- Event: 110 metres hurdles

Jan Britstra (10 April 1905 – 7 March 1987) was a Dutch hurdler. He competed in the men's 110 metres hurdles at the 1928 Summer Olympics.
