= De Zwaluw, Oudemolen =

Dutch windmill

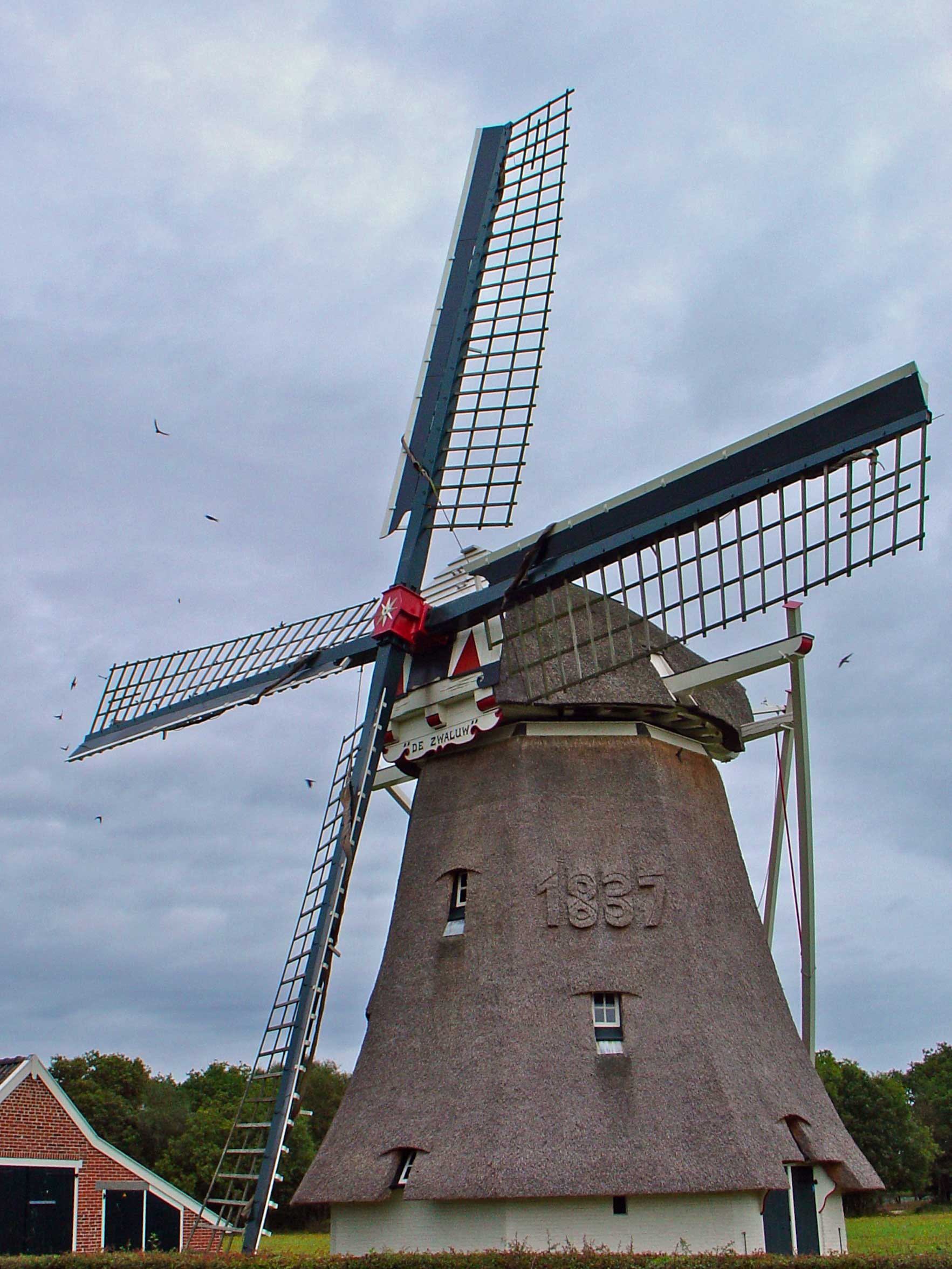
- Noordenveld, September 2009

Origin
- Mill name: De Zwaluw
- Mill location: Molensteeg 8, 9484 TE, Oudemolen
- Coordinates: 53°03′13.39″N 6°38′41.51″E
- Operator: Gemeente Tynaarlo
- Year built: 1837

Information
- Purpose: Corn mill
- Type: Smock mill
- Storeys: Three-storey smock
- Base storeys: One-storey base
- Smock sides: Eight sides
- No. of sails: Four sails
- Type of sails: Common sails
- Windshaft: Cast iron
- Winding: Tailpole and winch
- No. of pairs of millstones: Two pairs
- Size of millstones: One pair Cullen stone 1.40 metres (4 ft 7 in) diameter

De Zwaluw (English: The Swallow) is a smock mill in Oudemolen, Drenthe, the Netherlands. It was built in 1837 and is listed as a Rijksmonument, number 38148.

== History ==
De Zwaluw was built in 1837 by millwrights L Reinds of Beilen and B Sluter of De Groeve. The mill incorporated parts from a windmill at Schipborg which had been demolished. It replaced a post mill which itself had replaced a watermill on the Drentsche Aa river. The mill came into the ownership of the Greving family in 1876. It was worked by successive generations of the Greving family until 1947 when a sailstock broke.

In 1951, millwright Christiaan Bremer of Adorp, Groningen fitted a new cast-iron windshaft to replace the previous wooden one. This came from a windmill at Termunten, Groningen which had burnt down in 1944. A new pair of Patent sails was fitted at this time. The restored mill was officially opened on 27 September 1951. The mill was out of use from 1970 and in 1980 was purchased from the Greving family by the Gemeente Vries. A further restoration was undertaken in 1982. In 2008-09, further restoration work was carried out at the mill at a cost of €36,524.

== Description ==
De Zwaluw is what the Dutch describe as an "achtkante grondzeiler". It is a three-storey smock mill on a single-storey brick base. There is no stage, the sails reaching almost to the ground. The smock and cap are thatched. The mill is winded by a tailpole and winch. The four Common sails have a span of 20.00 metres (65 ft 7 in) are carried in a cast-iron windshaft, which was cast by Fabrikaat Prins van Oranje of The Hague, South Holland in 1893. It has been lengthened by about 1 metre (39 in) for use in De Zwaluw. The windshaft also carries the brake wheel, which has 60 cogs. The brake wheel drives the wallower (31 cogs) at the top of the upright shaft. At the bottom of the upright shaft the great spur wheel, which has 79 cogs, drives the 1.40 metres (4 ft 7 in) diameter Cullen millstones via a lantern pinion stone nut which has 25 staves each. The millstones are driven overdrift. As of October 2009, the inner sail stock is the oldest surviving example made by Christiaan Bremer.

== Public access ==
De Zwaluw is open on Saturdays from 11:00 to 16:00. During the summer months it is also open on Wednesdays from 14:00 to 16:00.
