= J. P. Kuiper =

Professor of social medicine

Jan Pieter Kuiper (29 May 1922, Norg – 13 September 1985, Haarzuilens) was a professor of social medicine at the Protestant Free University of Amsterdam. He worked from 1948 to 1958 as a mission doctor on Sumba, Indonesia, for the Dutch Reformed Church. In 1968 he investigated the level of satisfaction at social medicine workers. Some years before that he promoted on the subject company doctors and working humans. He became professor in 1972. In 1975, Kuiper played a major role in the promotion of the idea of unconditional basic income in the Netherlands, after a conference where he gave a passionate and controversial speech. Later on he gave a series of lecture on the need to ‘disconnect productive labour and income’.

His ideas influenced Christian-leftists and the ecologist movement.
