= Norg =

- Village
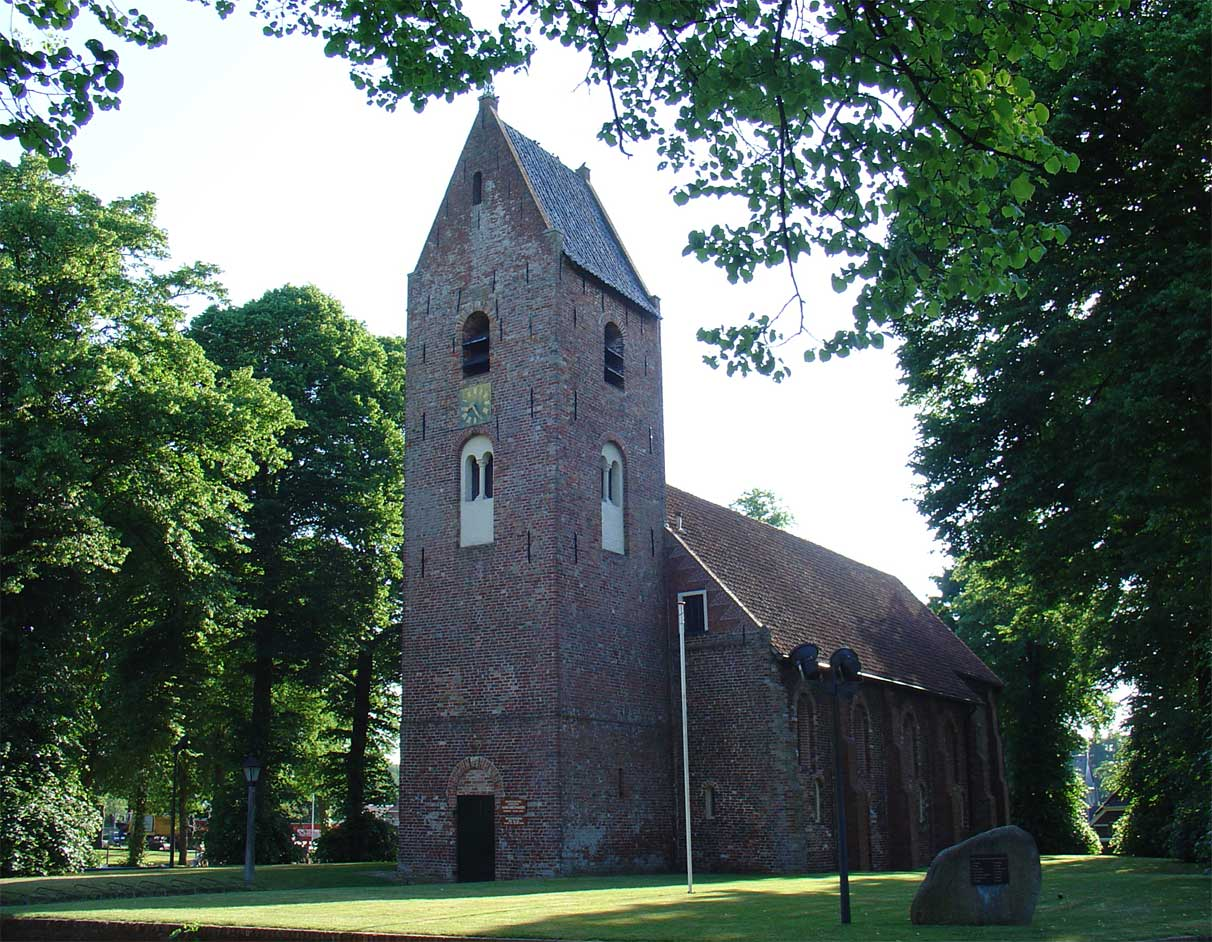
- St Margareta Church

- Flag

- Location in province of Drenthe in the Netherlands Norg (Netherlands)
- Coordinates: 53°3′58″N 6°27′34″E
- Country: Netherlands
- Province: Drenthe
- Municipality: Noordenveld

Area
  - Total: 18.84 km^{2} (7.27 sq mi)
- Elevation: 9 m (30 ft)

Population (2021)
  - Total: 3,745
  - Density: 198.8/km^{2} (514.8/sq mi)
- Time zone: UTC+1 (CET)
  - Summer (DST): UTC+2 (CEST)
- Postal code: 9331
- Dialing code: 0592

Norg is a village in the northeastern Netherlands. It is located in the municipality of Noordenveld, Drenthe. It used to be an independent municipality until 1998. Norg is home to two windmills.

== History ==
Norg is an esdorp which developed in the Middle Ages on higher grounds. It was first mentioned in 1149 as Nurch. The etymology of the name is unknown. Norg contains six communal pastures around which houses were built. The Dutch Reformed Church is a 13th-century Romanesque church on the Church Brink, which has a saddle-roof tower.

Norg developed during the peat exploitation in the area. In 1931, "Vacantie en Rustoord Den en Duin" planned to build a large holiday resort in the forest near the village. Even though their plans did not come to fruition, several smaller resorts have been established in Norg.

On 8 April 1945, just before the liberation of Drenthe, eight members of the resistance were executed in the forest Oosterduinen near Norg. Ten others were executed in Bonhagen near Norg. In 1985, memorials were placed at the execution sites.

In the later part of the 20th century, the village started grow and became a suburb for the city of Groningen and Assen. Until 1 January 1998, Norg was an independent municipality. Since the municipal reorganisation of the province Drenthe, Norg is a part of the Noordenveld municipality.

== Windmills ==
In Norg there are two windmills. One of these, Noordenveld, is a corn mill and was built in 1878. The other, De Hoop, is the only windmill in the Netherlands with Bilau sails.

== Sports ==
In 1912, a motocross circuit was laid out in the forests around Norg. The Grand Prix of Norg became an international motocross. In 1982, Norg organised its last Grand Prix.

== Notable people ==
- Andrea Bosman (born 1979), cyclist
- Jan Britstra (1905–1987), hurdler who competed at the 1928 Summer Olympics
- Jan Pieter Kuiper (1922–1985), professor social medicine

== Gallery ==
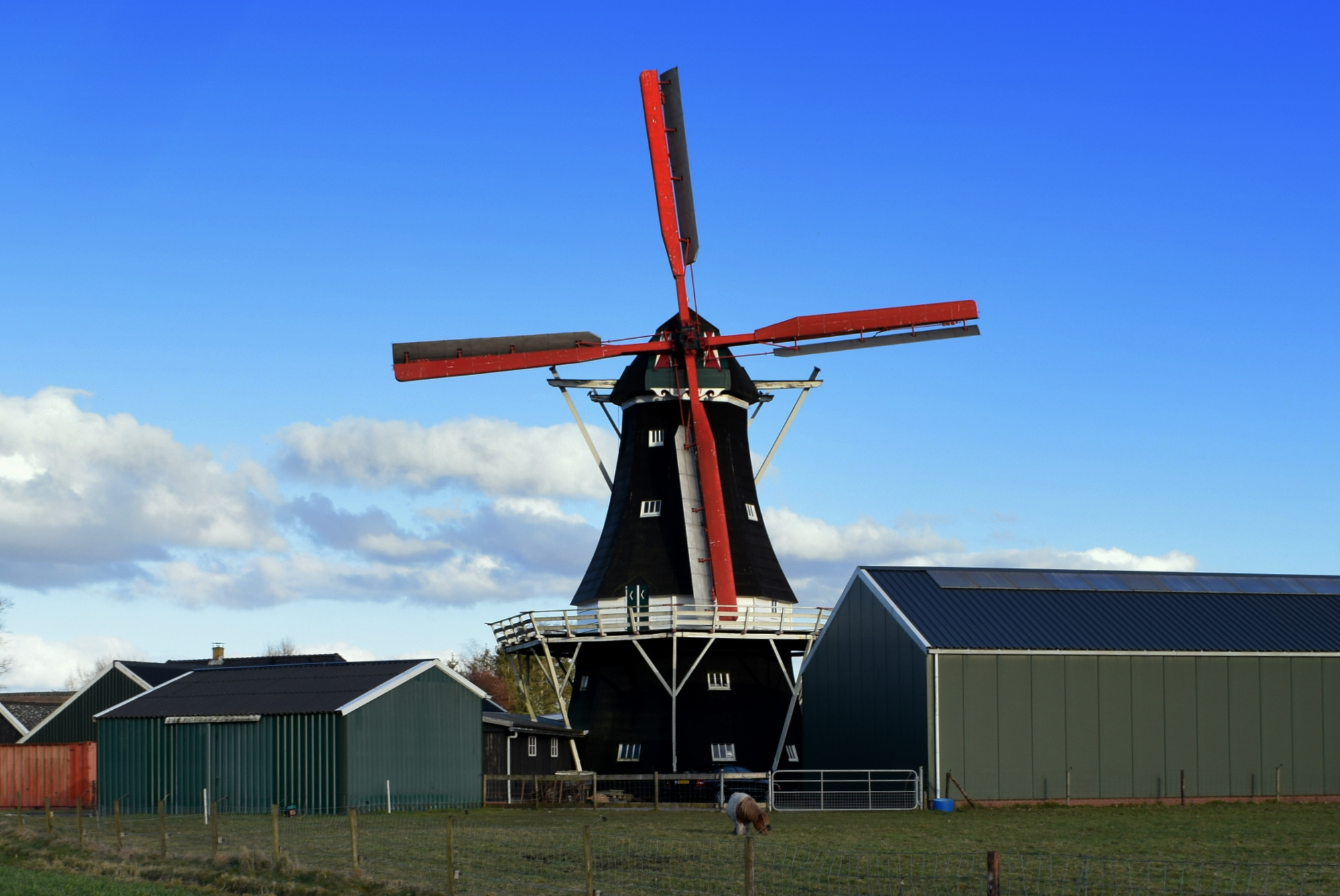
Windmill De Hoop

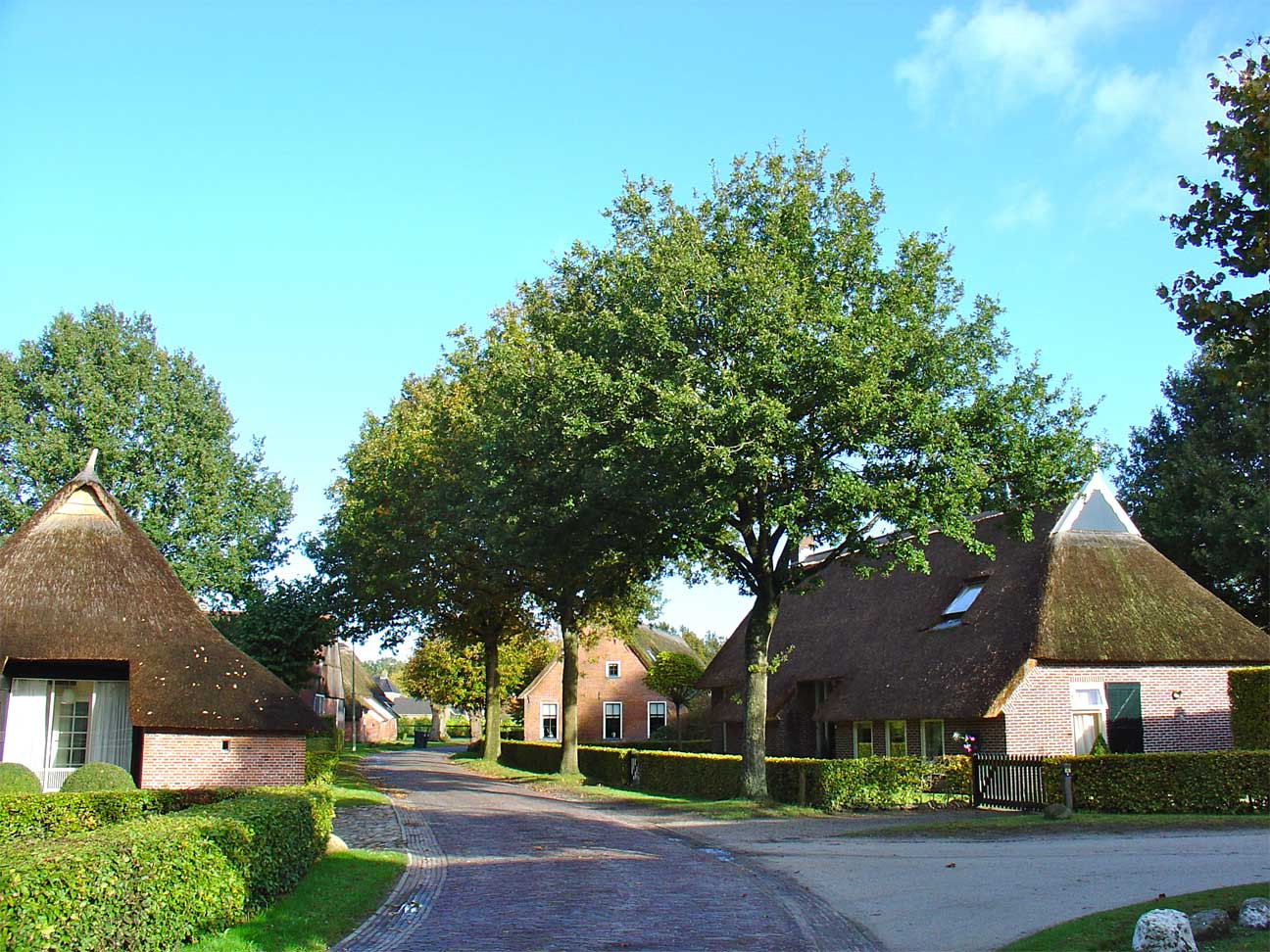
Village street

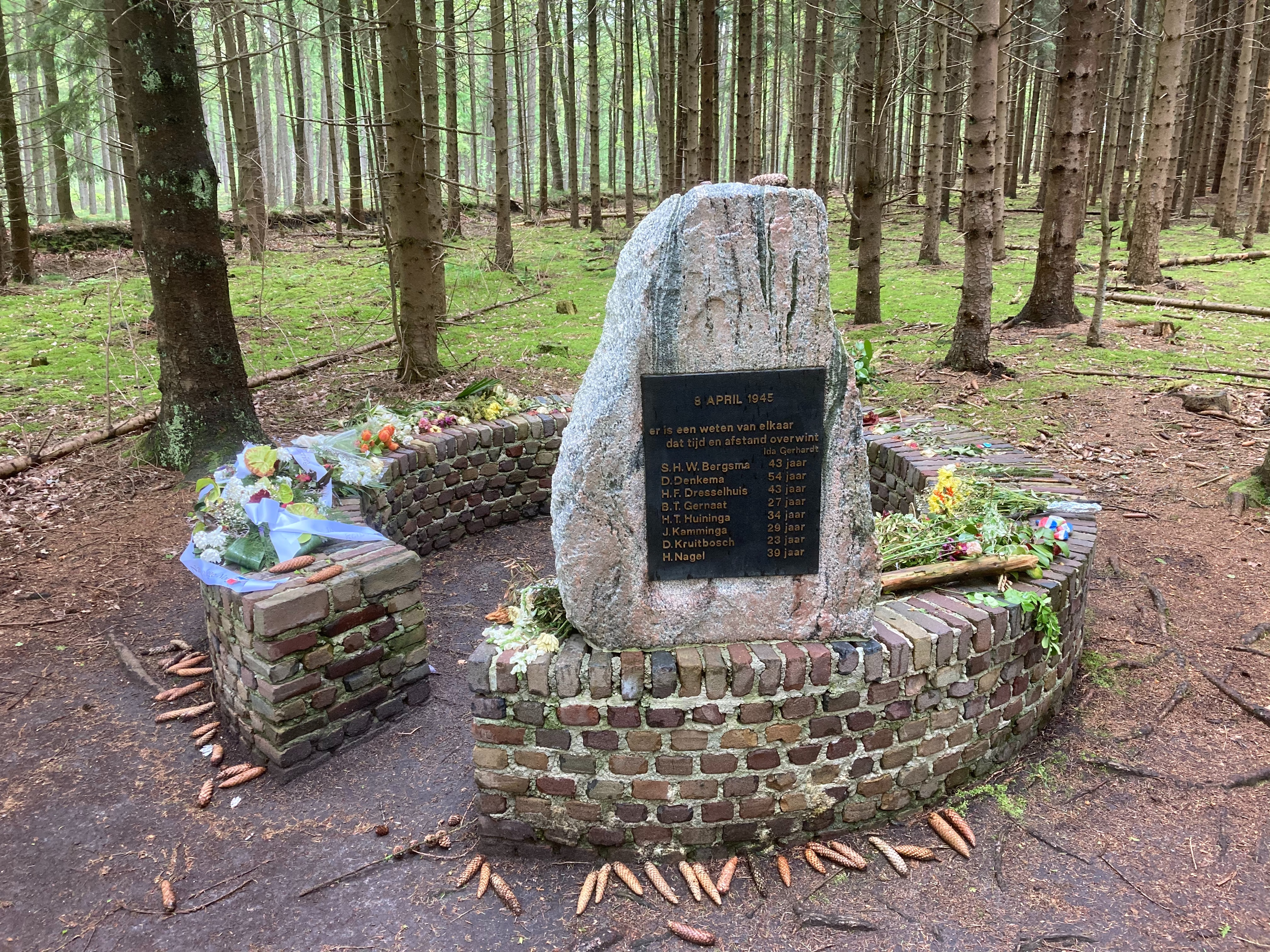
Oosterduinen monument

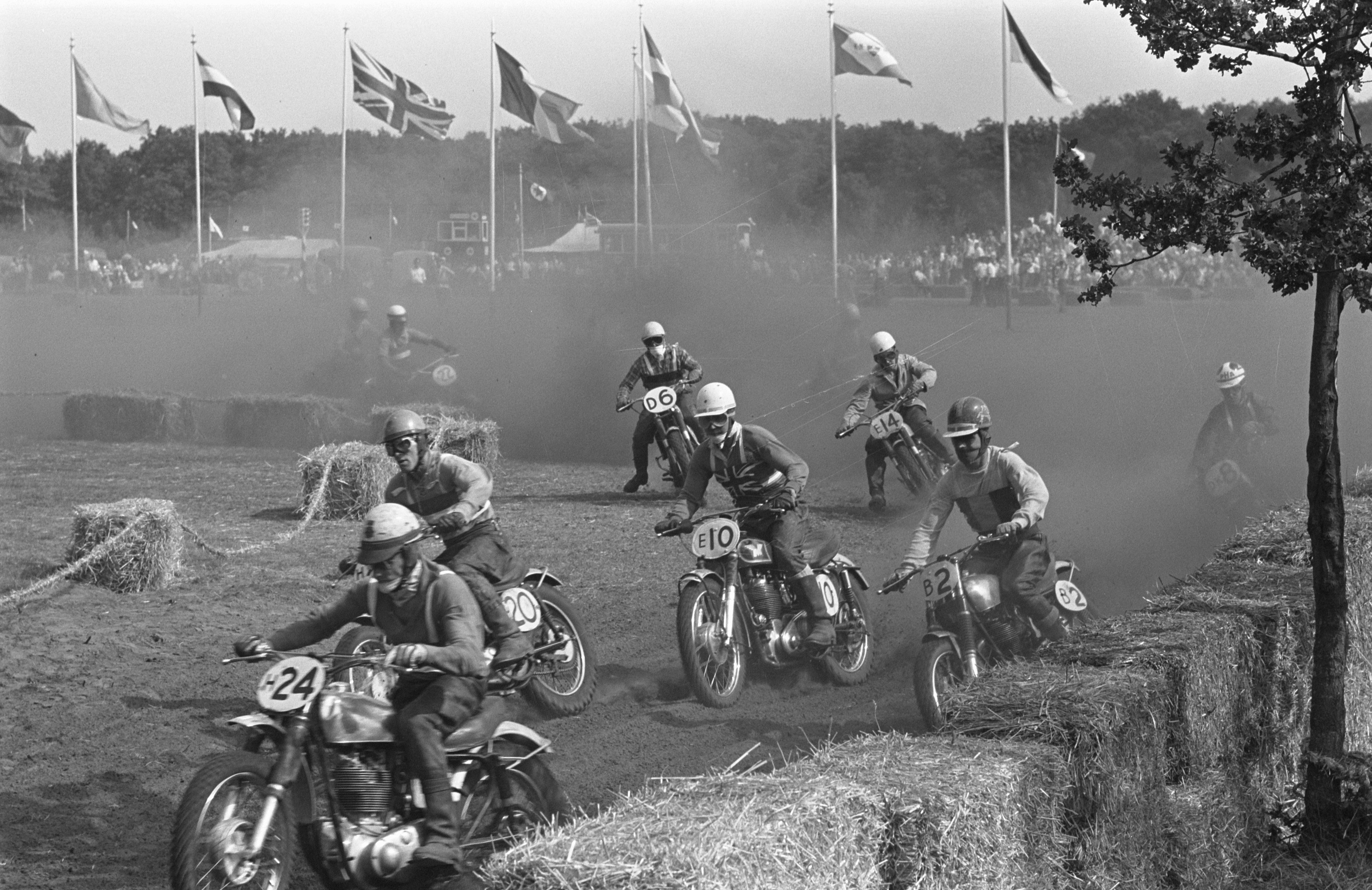
Norg motocross (1959)
