= Woldzigt, Roderwolde =

Windmill in Roderwolde, Netherlands

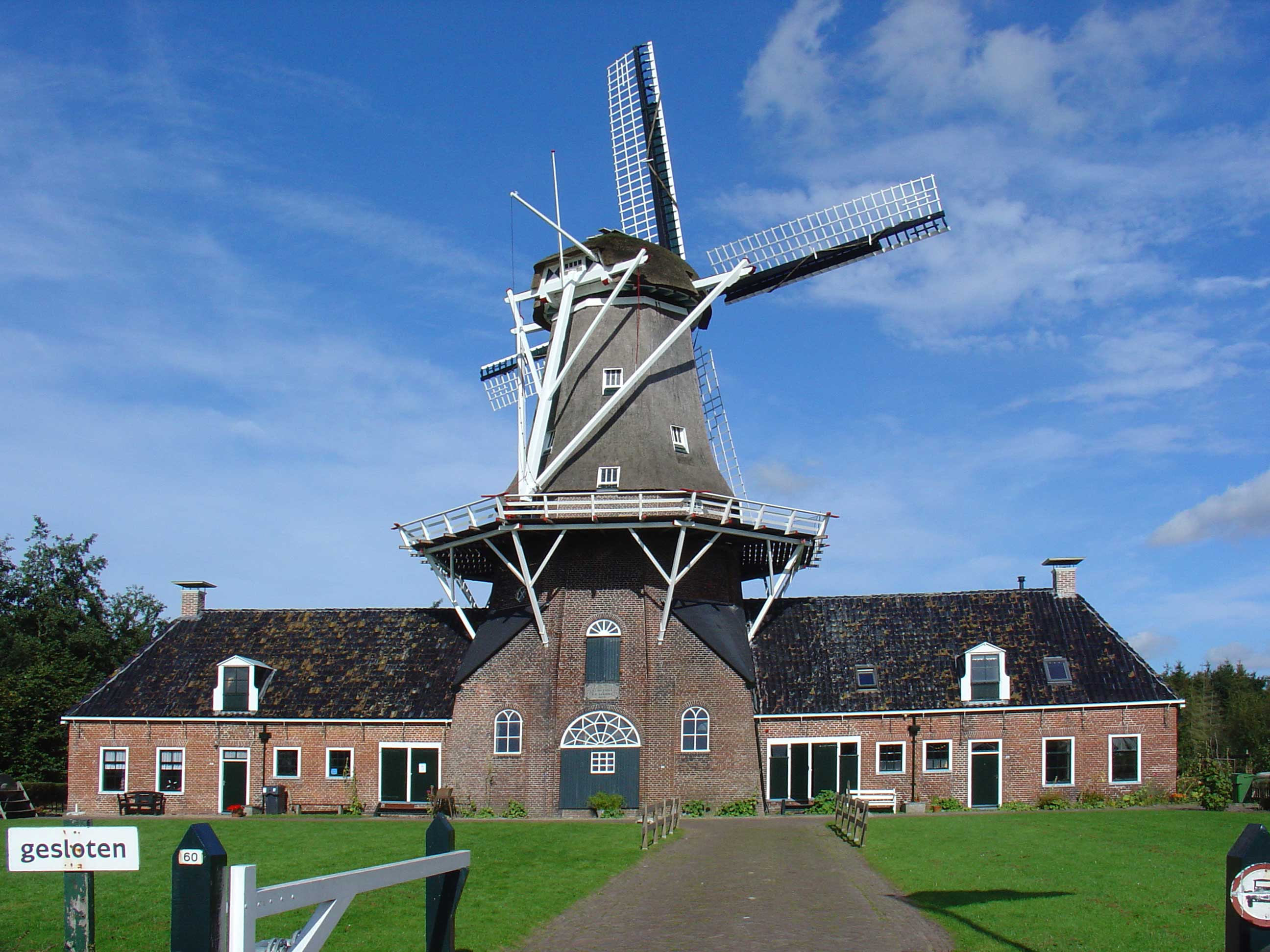
- Woldzigt, September 2009

Origin
- Mill name: Woldzigt
- Mill location: Hoofdstraat 38, 9315 PC, Roderwolde
- Coordinates: 53°10′14″N 6°28′46″E
- Operator(s): Gemeente Noordenveld
- Year built: 1852

Information
- Purpose: Grain mill and oil mill
- Type: Smock mill
- Storeys: Three-storey smock
- Base storeys: Four-storey base
- Smock sides: Eight sides
- No. of sails: Four sails
- Type of sails: Common sails
- Windshaft: Cast iron
- Winding: Tailpole and winch
- Auxiliary power: Petrol engine, later a steam engine
- No. of pairs of millstones: Two pairs
- Size of millstones: 1.60 metres (5 ft 3 in) diameter. also a pair of edge runner stones 1.80 metres (5 ft 11 in) diameter

Woldzigt (Drèents for 'view of the woods') is a smock mill in Roderwolde, Drenthe, the Netherlands. The mill has two functions; a grain mill and an oil mill. It was built in 1852 and is listed as a Rijksmonument, number 32541.

== History ==
Woldzigt was built in 1852 for S J Datema and E F Aukema. It was built as a grain mill and oil mill combined. The oil mill was used to crush linseed to produce linseed oil and rapeseed to produce rapeseed oil. The season for oil milling ran from September until May. Throughout the year the mill also functioned as a grain mill.

In 1902, the mill was sold to Jan Rietema of Leens. A Deutz petrol engine was installed in that year as auxiliary power. In 1906, the petrol engine was replaced by a steam engine. Rietema worked the mill until 1919 when he left to take the oil mill Tjamsweer at Appingedam, Groningen. The steam engine was removed at that date. The mill was then sold to the coöperatieve olieslagerij en korenmalerij Woldzigt G.A. It was worked by Jan Faber who had been employed at the mill since 1912. During this time the mill was used to produce cattle food and artificial fertiliser. In 1941, the mill ceased to produce oil. The mill was sold to the Coöperatieve Zuivelfabriek Roden-Zevenhuizen in 1945. Jan Faber died in 1946. The mill was then worked by Frederick van der Velde, who had been employed at the mill since 1925. The mill was producing 5,600 kilograms (880 st) of wheatflour per day. Grain milling ended in 1951.

In 1970, the mill was sold to the Gemeente Roden. The Stichting olie- en korenmolen Woldzigt (English: Oil and grain mill Woldzigt Society) was formed. The mill was completely restored in 1976.

== Description ==
Woldzigt is what the Dutch describe as an "achtkante stellingmolen". It is a three-storey smock mill on a four-storey brick base. The stage is at third-floor level, 10.00 metres (32 ft 10 in) above ground level. The smock and cap are thatched. The mill is winded by a tailpole and winch. The four Common sails, which have a span of 22.00 metres (72 ft 2 in), are carried in a cast-iron windshaft, which was cast by Koning in 1904. The windshaft also carries the brake wheel, which has 72 cogs. The brake wheel drives the wallower (48 cogs) at the top of the upright shaft. At the bottom of the upright shaft the great spur wheel, which has 103 cogs, drives the 1.60 metres (5 ft 3 in) diameter French Burr millstones via a lantern pinion stone nut which has 24 staves. The 1.80 metres (5 ft 11 in) diameter edge runner stones and the stamp mills are driven by lantern pinion stone nuts of 26 and 27 staves.

== Millers ==
- S J Datema 1852-1902
- E F Aukema 1852-1902
- Jan Rietema 1902-19
- Jan Faber 1912-46
- Frederick van der Velde 1925-51

== Public access ==
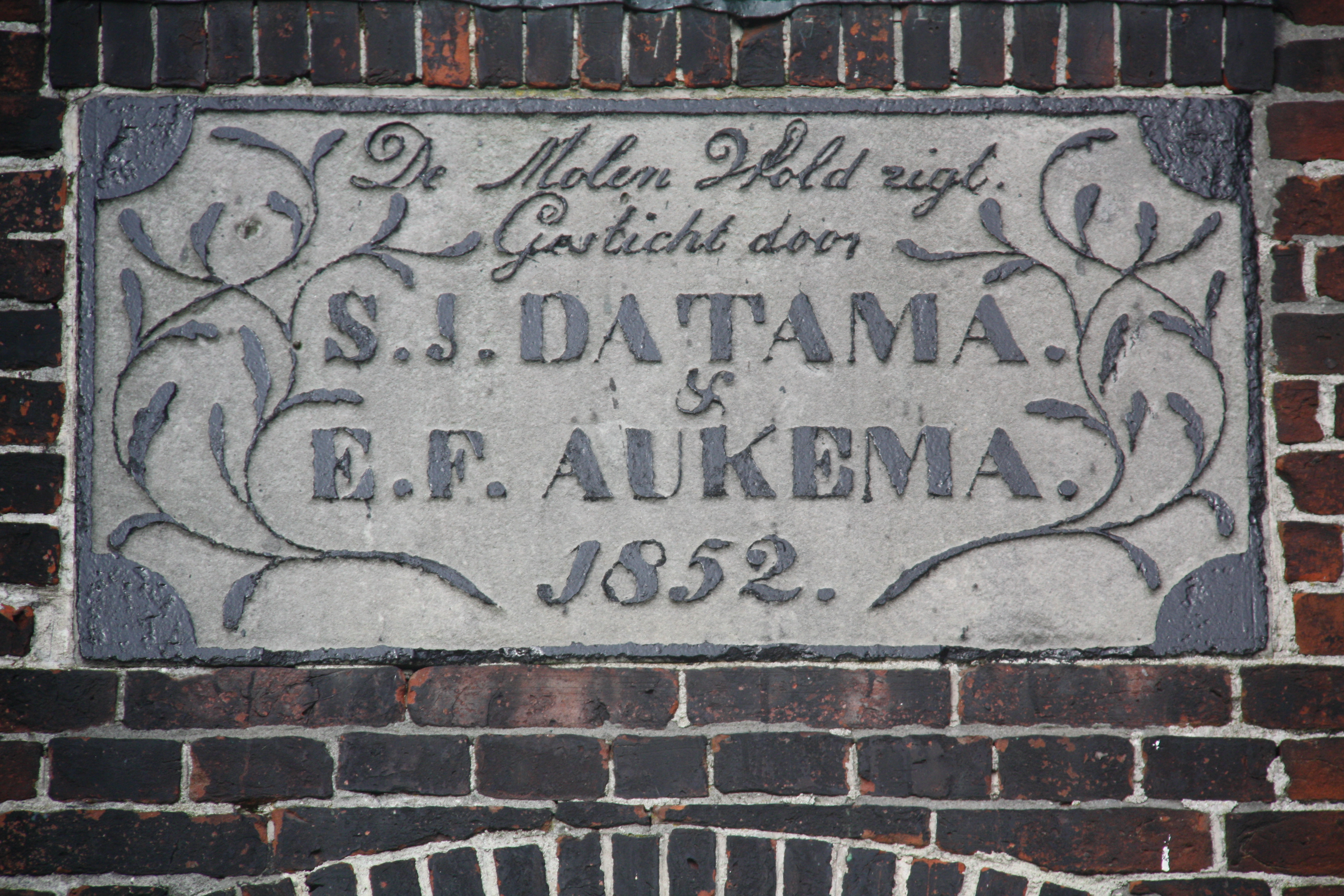
Foundation stone

Woldzigt is open all year round on the first Saturday in the month from 13:30 to 17:00. From May to September, the mill is open Wednesdays to Saturdays from 13:30 to 17:00.
