= Jantina Hellingmolen =

Windmill in Aalden, Netherlands

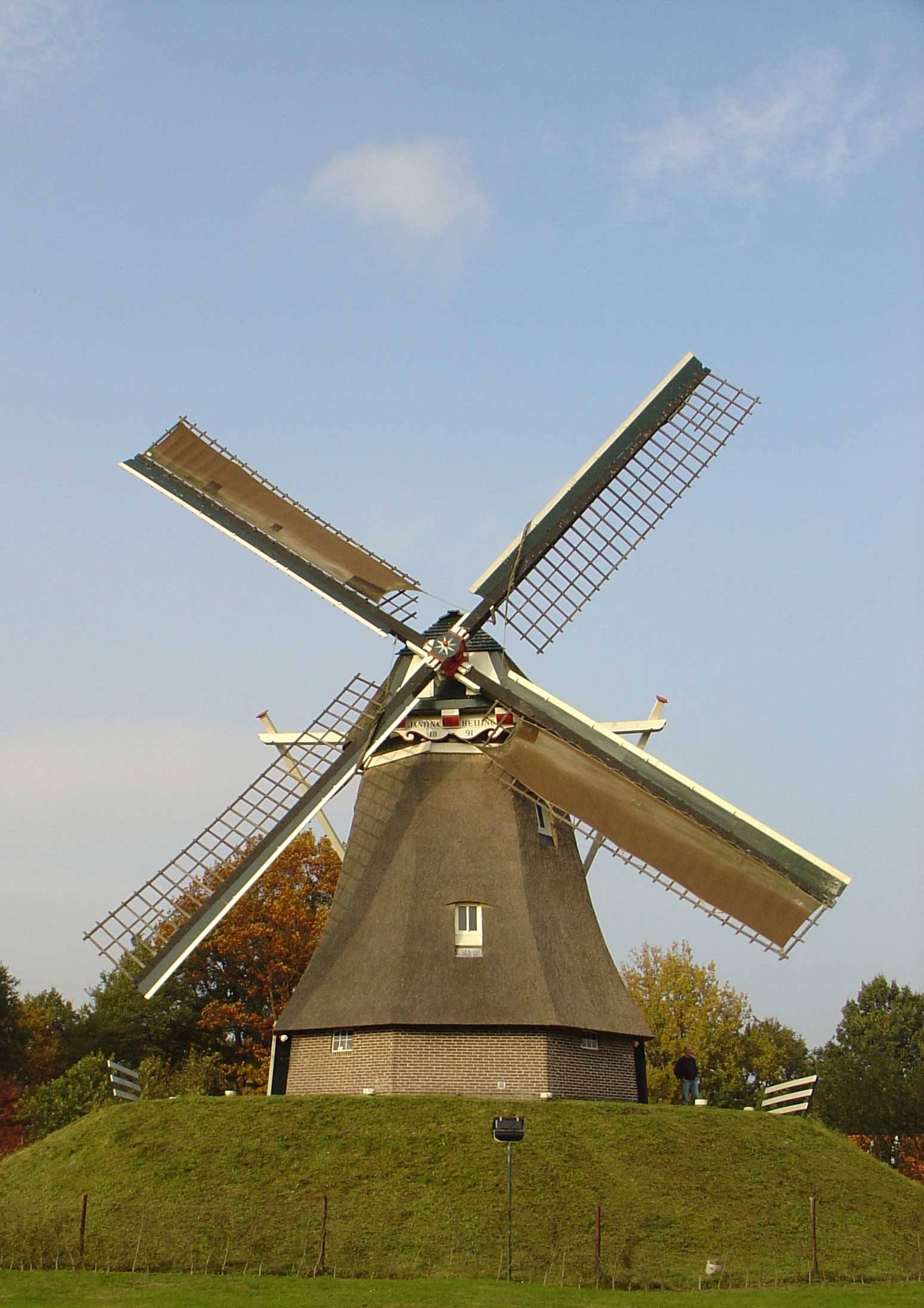

Origin
- Mill name: Jantina Hellingmolen; Aeldermeul; Aalder Molen
- Mill location: Molenwijk 13, 7854 PV, Aalden
- Coordinates: 52°47′18″N 6°42′50″E
- Operator(s): Gemeente Coevorden
- Year built: 1891

Information
- Purpose: Corn mill
- Type: Smock mill
- Storeys: Two-storey smock
- Base storeys: Two-storey base
- Smock sides: Eight sides
- No. of sails: Four Sails
- Type of sails: Common sails
- Windshaft: Cast iron
- Winding: Tailpole and winch
- No. of pairs of millstones: Two pairs of Cullens
- Size of millstones: 1.40 metres (4 ft 7 in)

Jantina Hellingmolen (English Jantina Helling's Mill, formerly called Aeldermeul or Aalder Molen) is a smock mill in Aalden, Netherlands. The mill is listed as a Rijksmonument, number 41518.

== History ==
There has been a windmill on this site since 1652. This first mill was a post mill, which from 1740, when it was bought by Willem Helling, was owned by the Helling family. In 1835, a new smock mill was built by Willem Helling's grandson, also named Willem Helling. This was a corn and barley mill, and much larger than the original mill. Willem Helling died in 1863 and the mill passed to his son Klaas, whose wife gave birth in 1863 to a daughter, Jantiena. Klaas died in 1865 and Jantiena's mother remarried. In 1890, the mill burnt down during a thunderstorm.

The new mill was built by millwright L Reinds of Beilen. It was called the Aeldermeul. Jantiena came to possess the mill in 1899 and rented it out until 1919 when the mill ceased working for trade. Jantiena Helling died in 1949 and her heirs sold the mill, for a nominal sum, for preservation with the condition that the mill be named for Jantiena. The mill was restored in 1952 by millwright A Romeling of Eexta, using parts from the drainage mill De Bolderij, Noordbroeksterhamrijk, Gelderland, which had been demolished in 1950. The mill was closed in 1978 when it needed further restoration. This was completed in 1981 and since 1983 the mill has been kept in working order. Further restoration work was done in 1991. The mill was again restored in April 2006, with new thatch to the cap and smock.

== Description ==
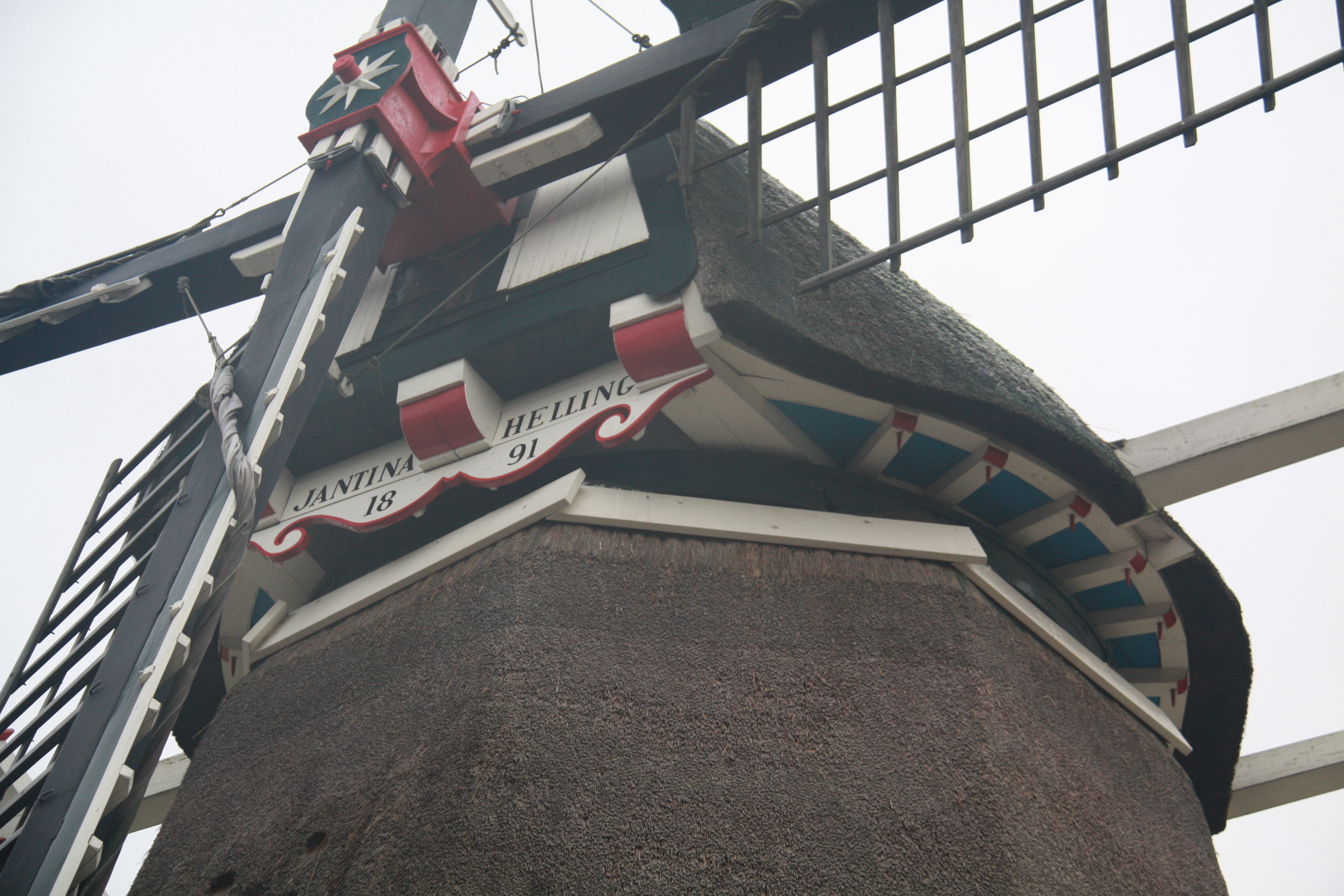
Close up

Jantina Hellingmolen is what the Dutch describe as an "achtkante beltmolen," an eight-sided smock mill which is built into a mound providing access to the sails. The mound is 3.10 metres (10 ft 2 in) high. The mill is a two-storey smock mill on a two-storey base. The cap and smock are thatched. The mill has four Common sails of 20.75 metres (68 ft 1 in) span and is winded by a tailpole and winch. The sails are carried on a cast-iron windshaft, cast by millwright Sterkman in 1865. The brake wheel has 59 cogs and drives a wallower with 29 cogs. This drives the great spur wheel (which has 67 cogs) driving the lantern pinion stone nuts, which have 23 staves each. Each stone nut drives a pair of 1.40 metres (4 ft 7 in) diameter blue or Cullen millstones. The millstones are driven overdrift.

== Public access ==
The mill is open to the public on Saturdays from 13:00 to 17:00 or by appointment. Flour produced at the mill is for sale.
