= Oudemolen, Drenthe =

Oudemolen
- Hamlet
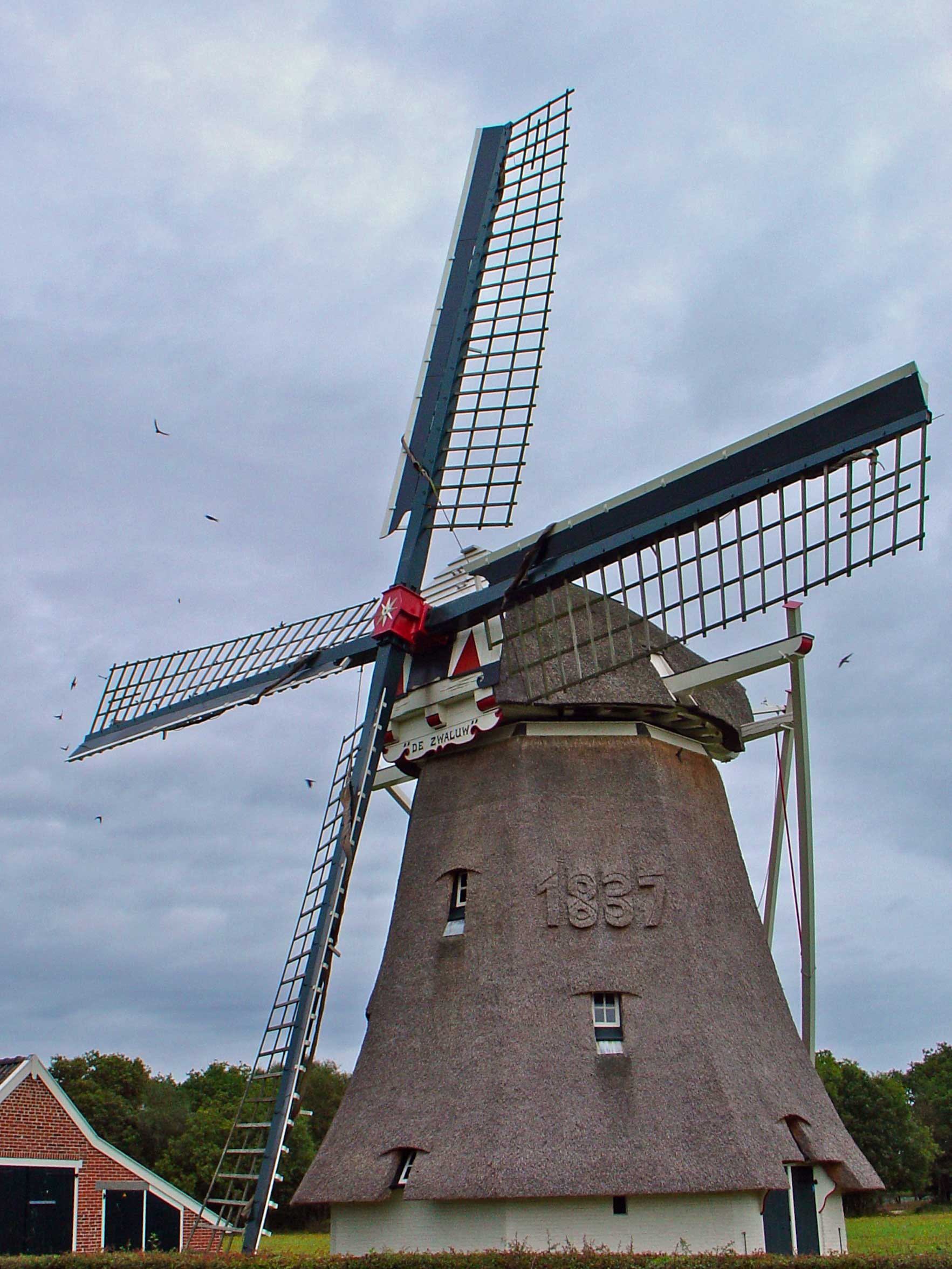
- Windmill De Zwaluw, Oudemolen

- Location in province of Drenthe in the Netherlands Oudemolen (Netherlands)
- Coordinates: 53°02′57″N 6°38′19″E
- Country: Netherlands
- Province: Drenthe
- Municipality: Tynaarlo

Area
  - Total: 2.63 km^{2} (1.02 sq mi)
- Elevation: 7 m (23 ft)

Population (2021)
  - Total: 65
  - Density: 25/km^{2} (64/sq mi)
- Time zone: UTC+1 (CET)
  - Summer (DST): UTC+2 (CEST)
- Postal code: 9484
- Dialing code: 0592

Oudemolen is a hamlet in the Dutch province of Drenthe. It is a part of the municipality of Tynaarlo. Historically, the hamlet of Oude Molen was almost solely owned by the Linthorst Homan family, who have always held close ties with the towns population. The Linthorst Homan family rebuilt the windmill in the 19th century.

The village was first mentioned in 1498 as "de molner ter Oldenmolen", and means old wind mill. Oudemolen was home to 24 people in 1840.
