= Molen van Rolde =

Windmill in Rolde, Netherlands

Rolde Molen, Rolde
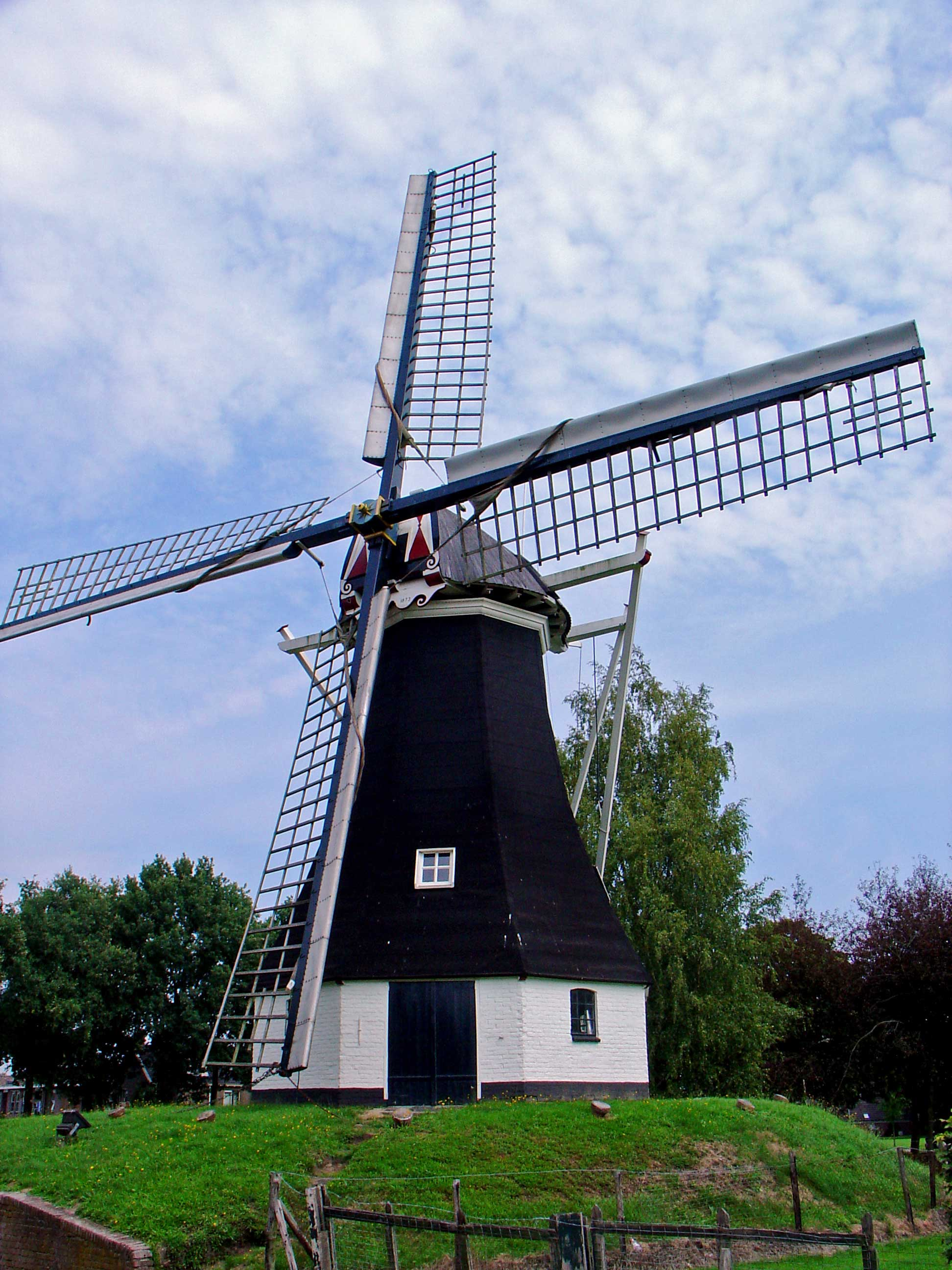
- Woldzigt, August 2008
- Interactive map of Rolde Molen, Rolde

Origin
- Mill name: Rolde Molen
- Mill location: Grote Brink 24, 9451 BR, Rolde
- Coordinates: 52°59′04″N 6°38′52″E
- Operator: Gemeente Aa en Hunze
- Year built: 1873

Information
- Purpose: Corn mill
- Type: Smock mill
- Storeys: Three-storey smock
- Base storeys: One-storey base
- Smock sides: Eight sides
- No. of sails: Four sails
- Type of sails: Common sails
- Windshaft: Cast iron
- Winding: Tailpole and winch
- No. of pairs of millstones: Two pairs
- Size of millstones: 1.30 metres (4 ft 3 in) diameter Cullen stones, 1.40 metres (4 ft 7 in) diameter French Burr stones

The Molen van Rolde is a smock mill in Rolde, Drenthe, the Netherlands. The mill was built in 1873 and is listed as a Rijksmonument, number 32698.

== History ==
A corn and barley mill which stood on this site was burnt down on 26 August 1872. The Molen van Rolde was built to replace it by millwright Hunse of Assen for Mr Smit. The mill has no formal name, taking its name from the town of Rolde. The mill passed through a number of owners and came into the ownership of the Schuiling family in 1892. The windshaft was replaced in 1911. Miller Schuiling advertised for an iron windshaft in De Molenaar of 16 April 1911. A 4.80 metres (15 ft 9 in) long windshaft cast by Zallandia of Zwolle was obtained and fitted. In October 1928 a sailstock broke in a storm. A replacement was not obtained until 1947 when a second hand pair of sails was obtained from the Krangeweersterpoldermolen at Stedum, Groningen. The mill was put into full repair at a cost of ƒ2,047. The work was financed by the Schuiling brothers, the State of the Netherlands, De Hollandsche Molen, the Algemene Nederlandse Wielrijders-Bond and the Bond Heemschut. In 1955, a further restoration at a cost of ƒ4,125 was financed in the same way, with the province of Drenthe and the Coöperatieve stoomzuivelfabriek en korenmalerij te Rolde also contributing. In 1955, a pair of sails needed replacement. This work was done by millwright Christiaan Bremer of Adorp, Groningen. The woodwork of the winding mechanism was identified as needing replacement in 1961 but the work was not done until 1963. In 1967 the cost of repairs to the mill was estimated at ƒ3,125. On 11 April 1968 the mill was sold to the Gemeente Rolde for ƒ4,900. A new pair of sails were fitted in 1974 by Christiaan Bremer. A restoration of the mill took place in 2000. In 2008, the sails were removed and the windshaft was also removed and examined for defects. A new 3.80 metres (12 ft 6 in) long windshaft cast by firm Geraedts was fitted. New sails were fitted, but retaining the sailstock made by Bremer in 1953 and fitted in 1955, one of the oldest remaining on a Dutch windmill.

== Description ==
The Molen van Rolde is what the Dutch describe as an "achtkante grondzeiler". It is a three-storey smock mill on a single-storey brick base. There is no stage, the sails reaching down almost to ground level. The smock and cap are thatched. The mill is winded by a tailpole and winch. The four Common sails, which have a span of 19.10 metres (62 ft 8 in), are carried in a cast-iron windshaft. The windshaft also carries the brake wheel, which has 47 cogs. The brake wheel drives the wallower (26 cogs) at the top of the upright shaft. At the bottom of the upright shaft the great spur wheel, which has 78 cogs, drives the 1.30 metres (4 ft 3 in) diameter Cullen millstones and 1.40 metres (4 ft 7 in) diameter French Burr millstones via lantern pinion stone nuts which has 24 staves each.

== Millers ==
- Smit 1873
- Koops
- Johannes Rijkens 1875-92
- J Schuiling 1892-44
- G and H Schuiling 1944-68

References for above:-

== Public access ==
The Molen van Rolde is open to the public on saturdays and by appointment.
