= Roderwolde =

- Village
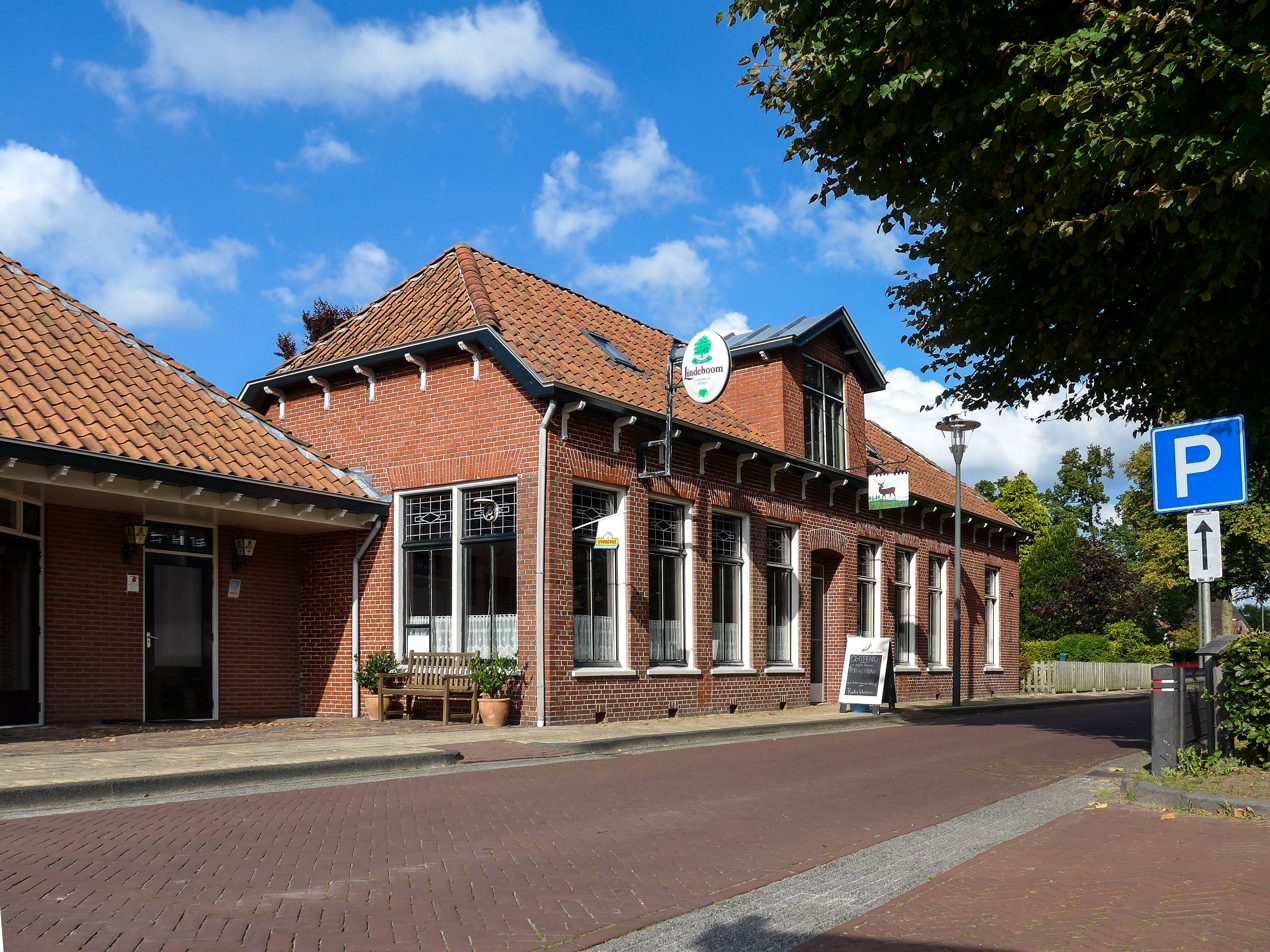
- Main street of Roderwolde

- Location in province of Drenthe in the Netherlands Roderwolde (Netherlands)
- Coordinates: 53°10′6″N 6°28′11″E
- Country: Netherlands
- Province: Drenthe
- Municipality: Noordenveld

Area
  - Total: 0.67 km^{2} (0.26 sq mi)
- Elevation: 1 m (3.3 ft)

Population (2021)
  - Total: 305
  - Density: 460/km^{2} (1,200/sq mi)
- Time zone: UTC+1 (CET)
  - Summer (DST): UTC+2 (CEST)
- Postal code: 9315
- Dialing code: 050

Roderwolde is a village in the Netherlands and is part of the Noordenveld municipality in Drenthe.

== History ==
Roderwolde is a road village which was established during the early middle ages for the excavation of peat. It was first mentioned in 1139 as Roterwolde and means "forest near Roden". Due to settling of the soil, most of the village was relocated to higher grounds in the south. Sandebuur is a remnant of the earliest settlement. The first church was built in the 12th century. The current church dates from 1831. In 1840, Roderwolde was home 142 people.

In 1852, Woldzigt, a corn and oil windmill, was built in Roderwolde. It was restored to working order in 1973–74.

Roderwolde used to have a little harbour which was removed in the 1960s. In 2016, Schippershoaven, a new harbour, opened for recreational boating.

== Gallery ==
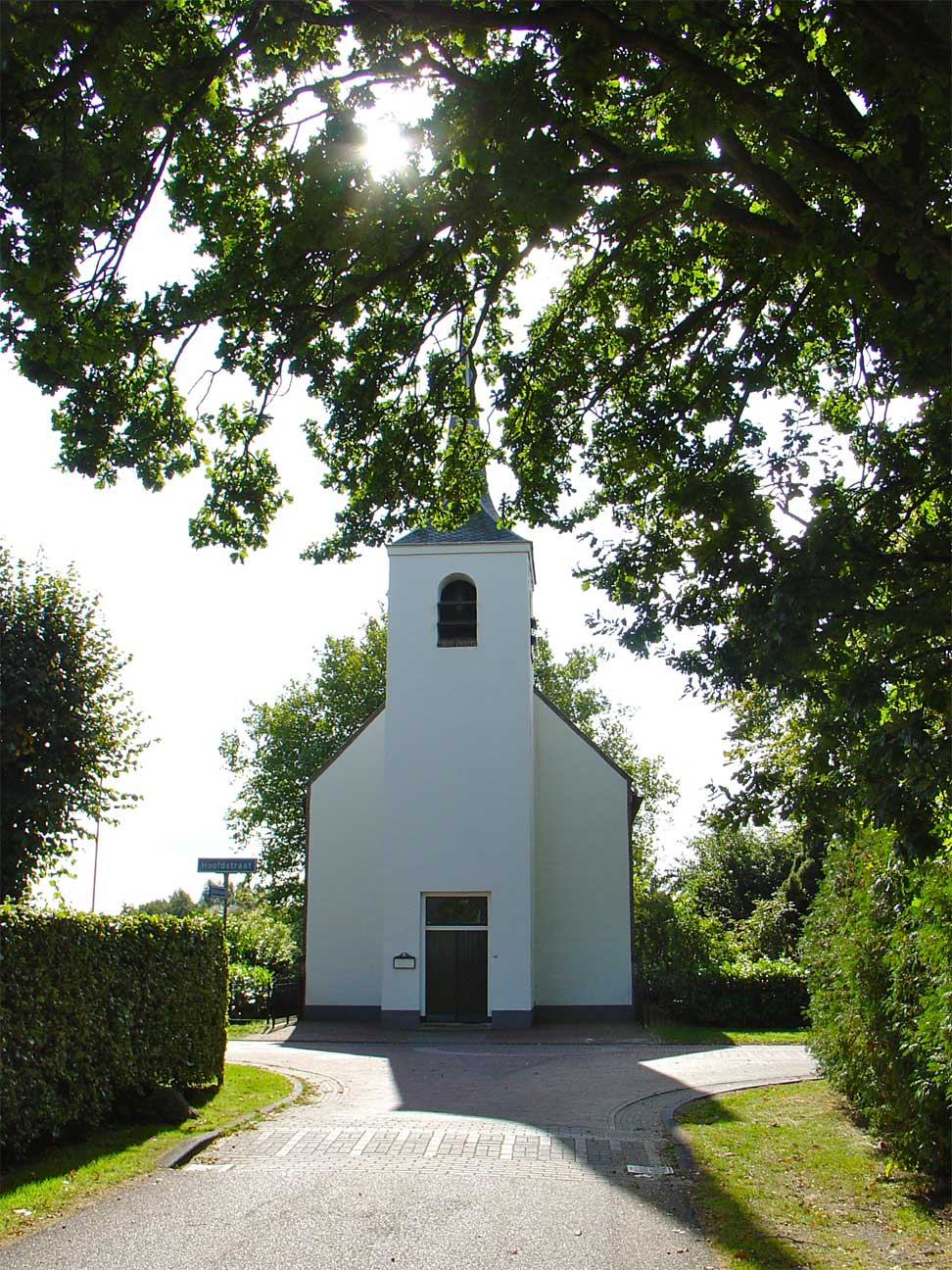
The Jacobskerk of Roderwilde

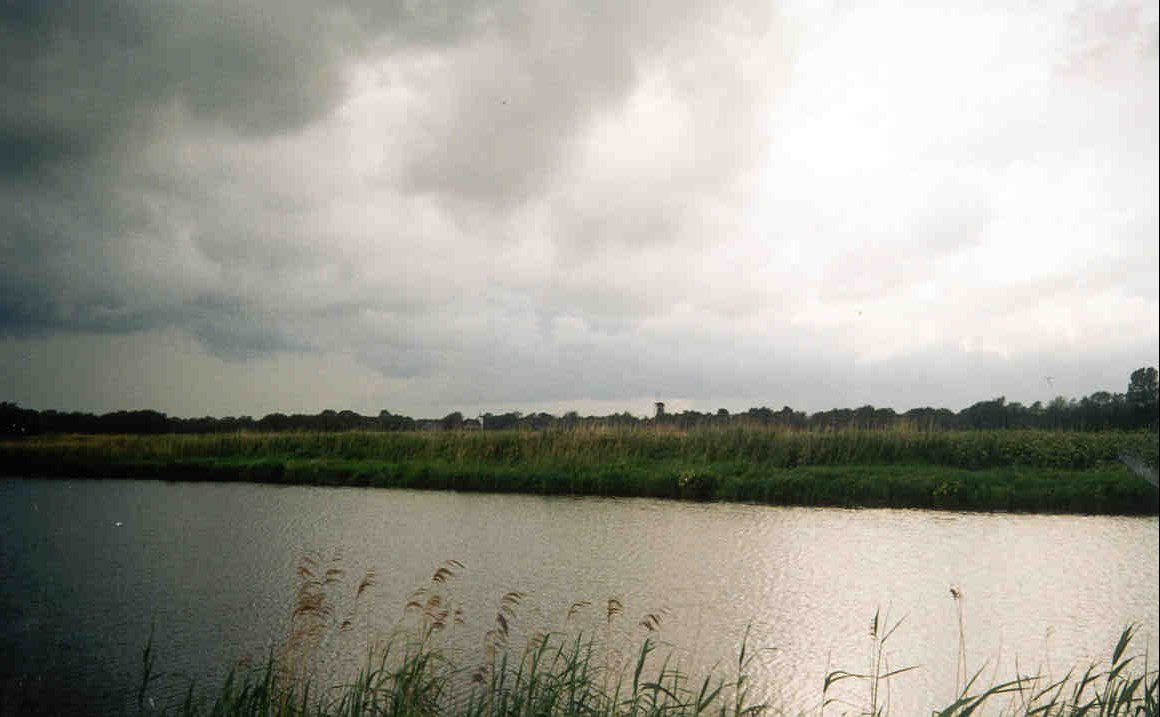
Nature near Roderwolde

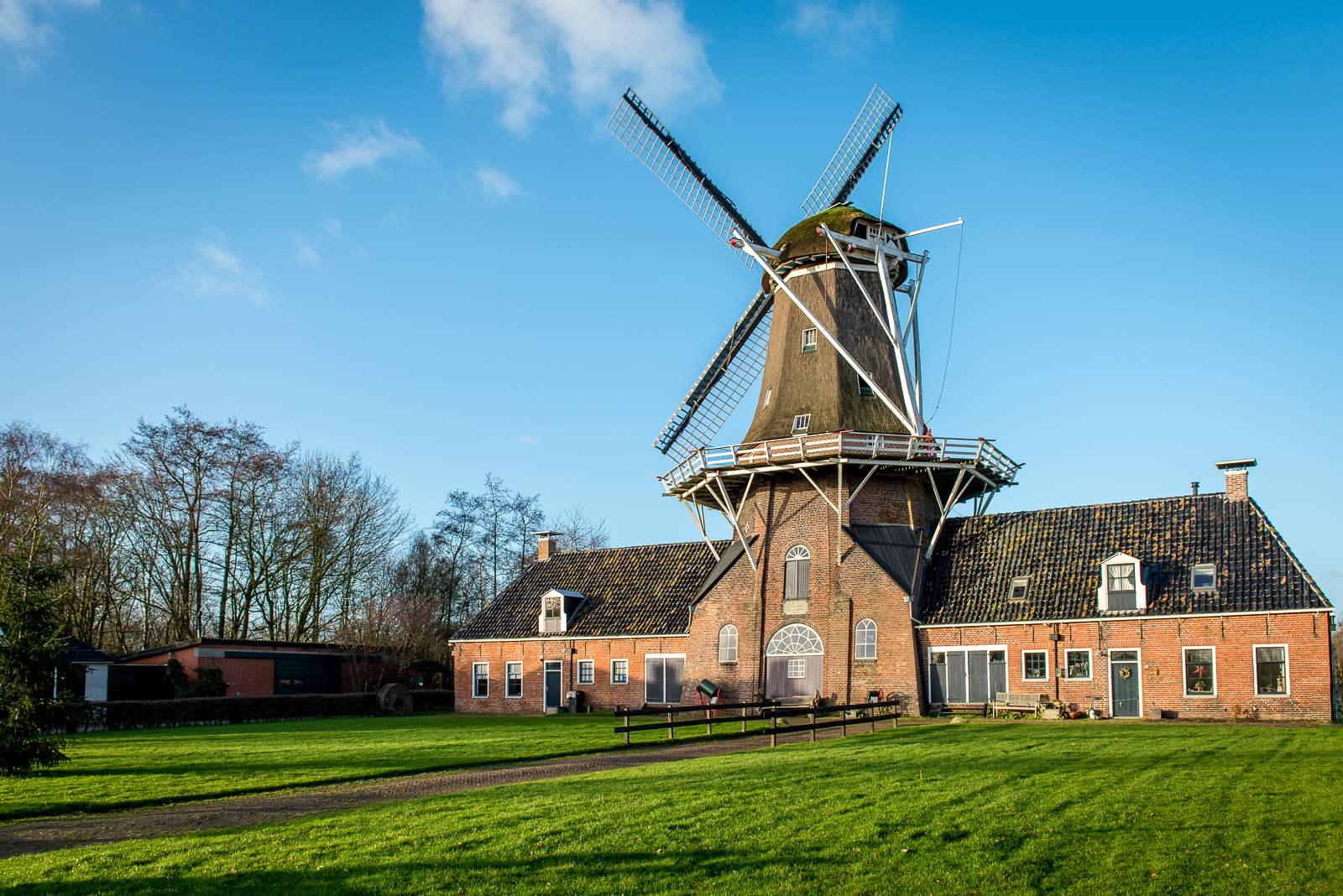
Windmill Woldzigt

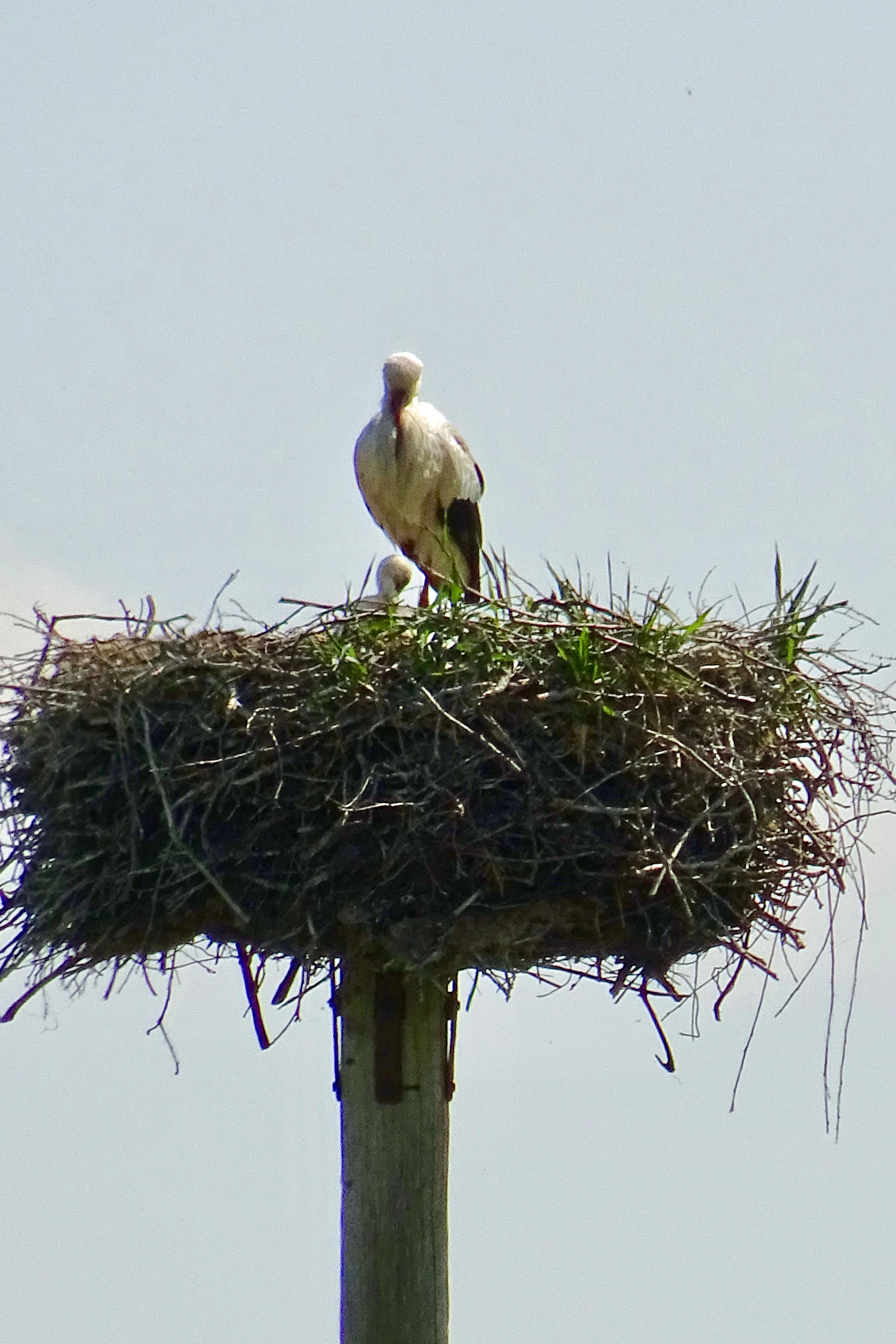
A stork in Roderwolde
