= Aalden =

- Village
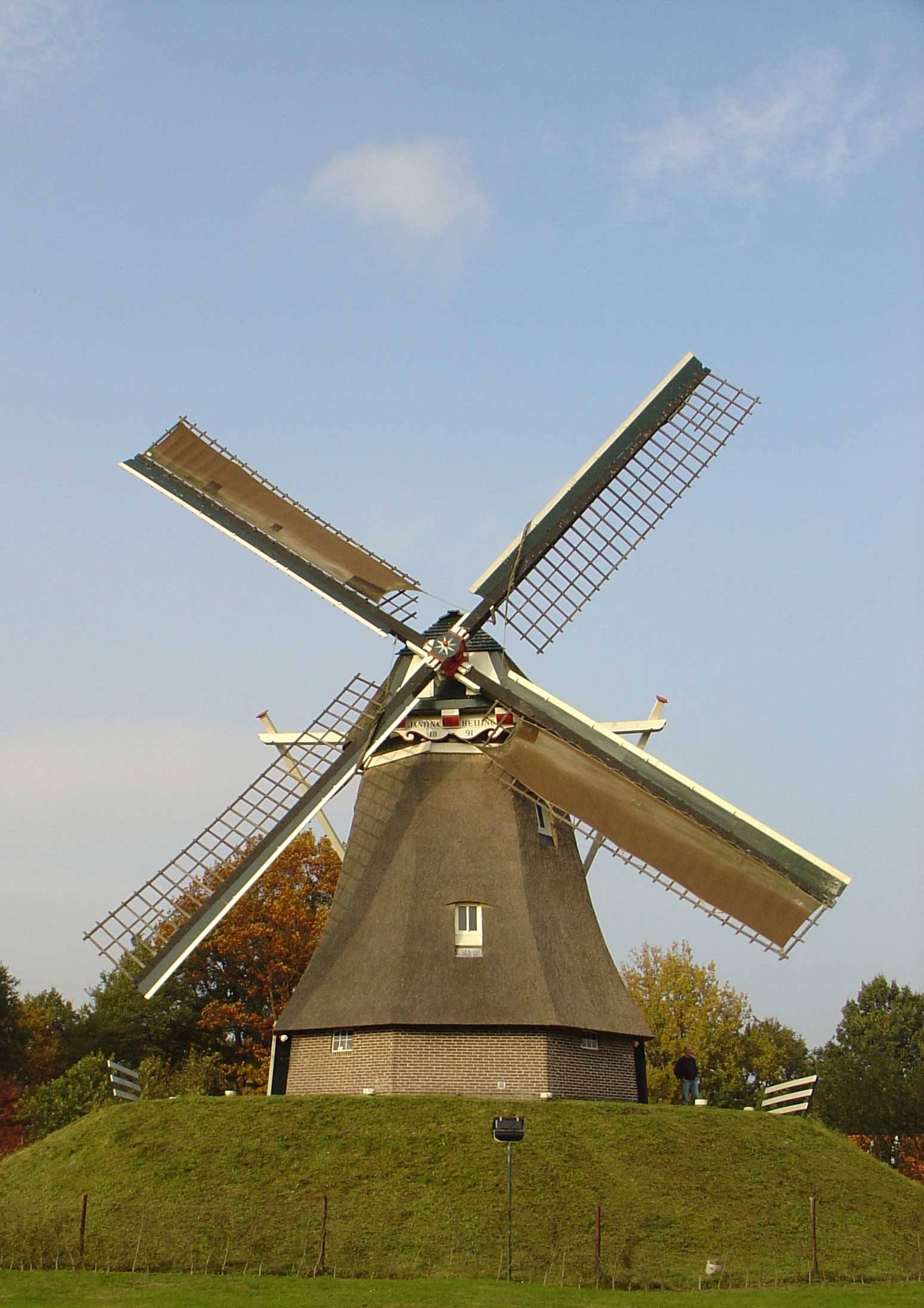
- Jantina Hellingmolen windmill

- Location in the province of Drenthe in the Netherlands Aalden (Netherlands) Aalden (Europe)
- Coordinates: 52°46′N 6°43′E
- Country: Netherlands
- Province: Drenthe
- Municipality: Coevorden

Area
  - Total: 1.08 km^{2} (0.42 sq mi)
- Elevation: 17 m (56 ft)

Population (2021)
  - Total: 1,635
  - Density: 1,510/km^{2} (3,920/sq mi)
- Time zone: UTC+1 (CET)
  - Summer (DST): UTC+2 (CEST)
- Postal code: 7854
- Dialing code: 0591

Aalden is a village in the Netherlands and it is part of the Coevorden municipality in Drenthe.

== History ==
Aalden developed in the Middle Ages on higher sand ground. The oldest part developed around a triangular village green without a church. It was first mentioned in 1332 as Alede. The etymology is unclear. Nowadays, it forms a single urban area with Zweeloo. In 1840, it was home to 116 people.

The Jantina Hellingmolen is a gristmill from 1891 and is still in service on a voluntary basis.

== Gallery ==
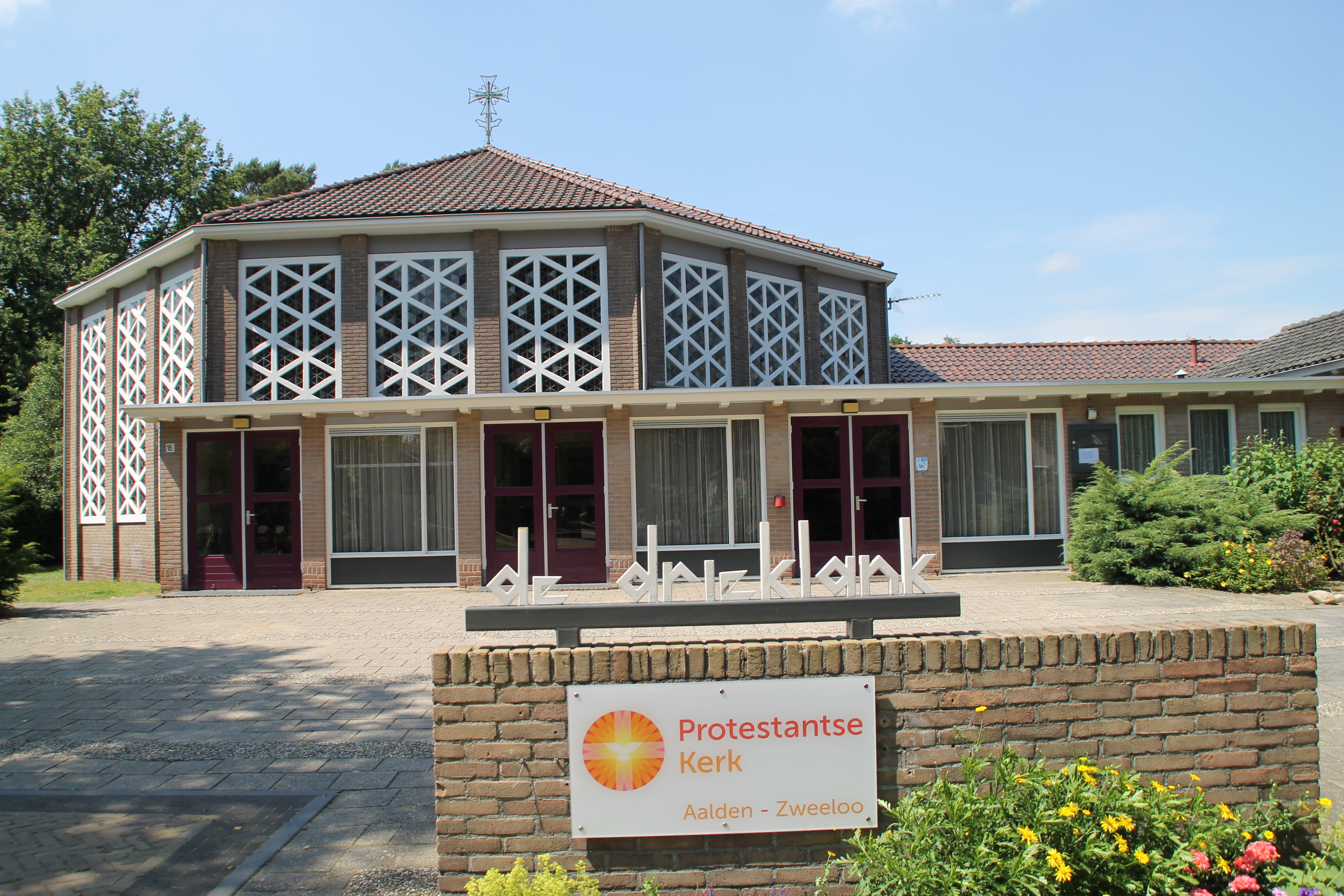
Protestant church

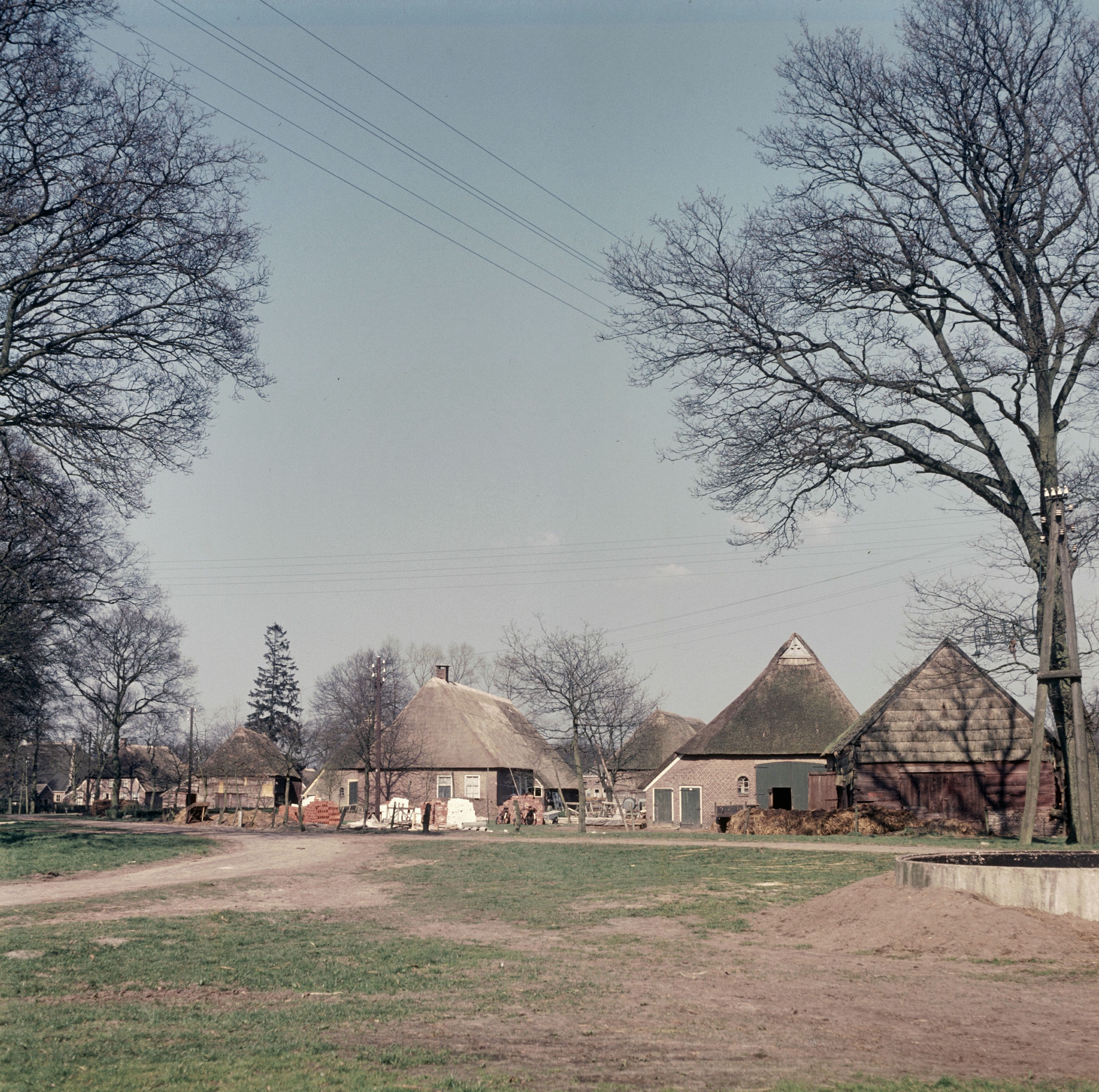
Farms in Aalden

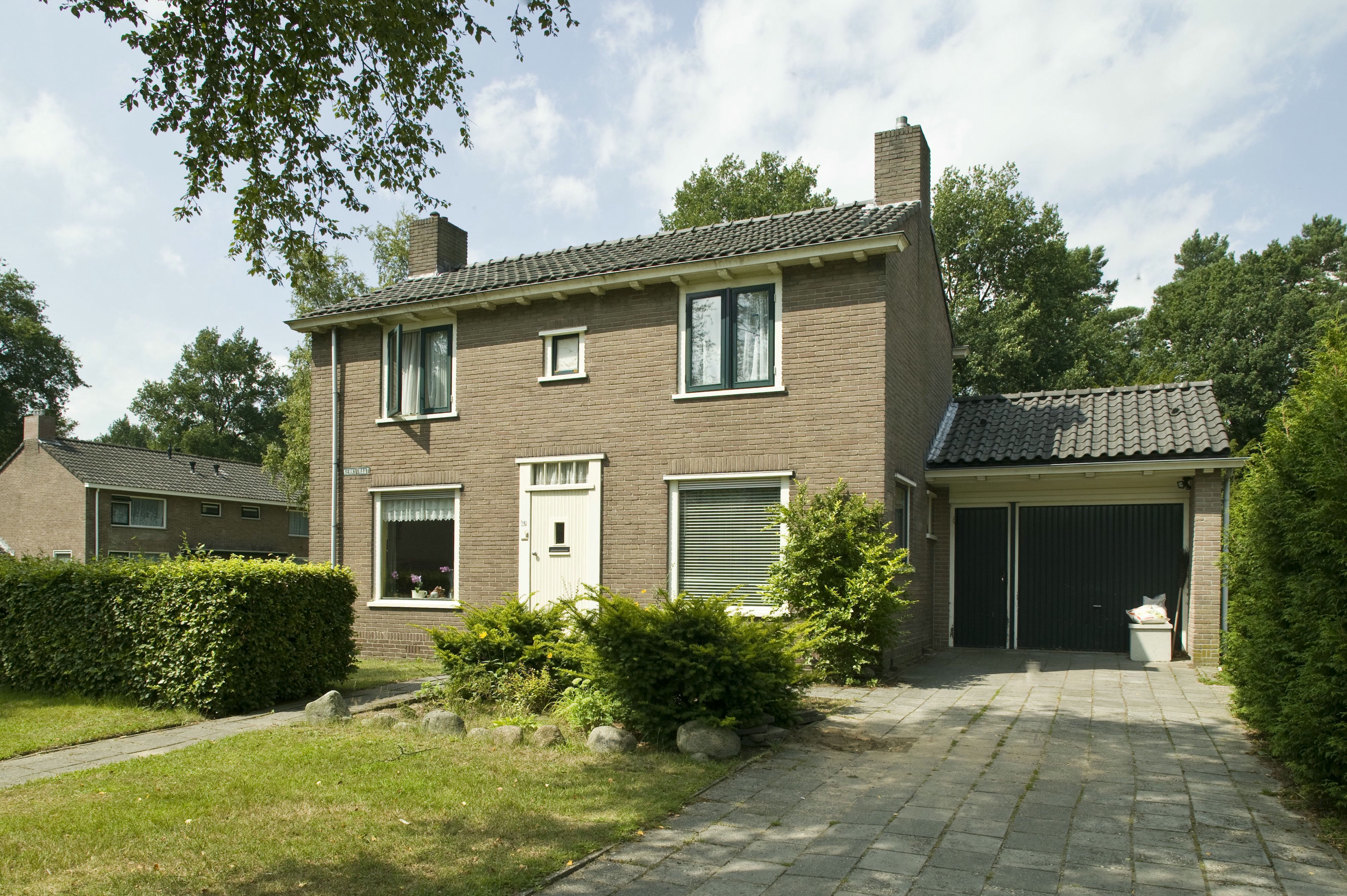
House in Aalden

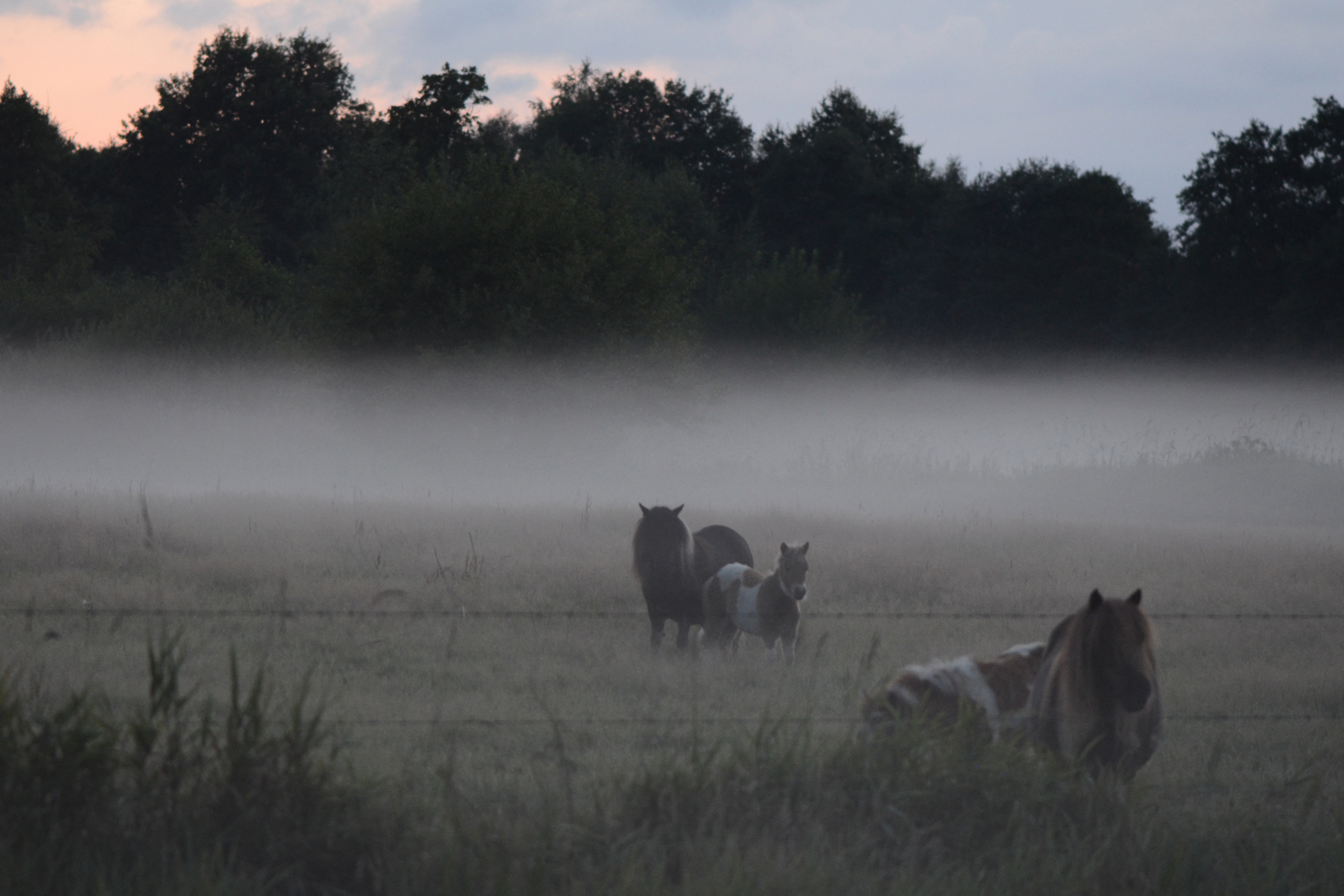
Horses in the mist
