= De Hoop, Norg =

Dutch windmill

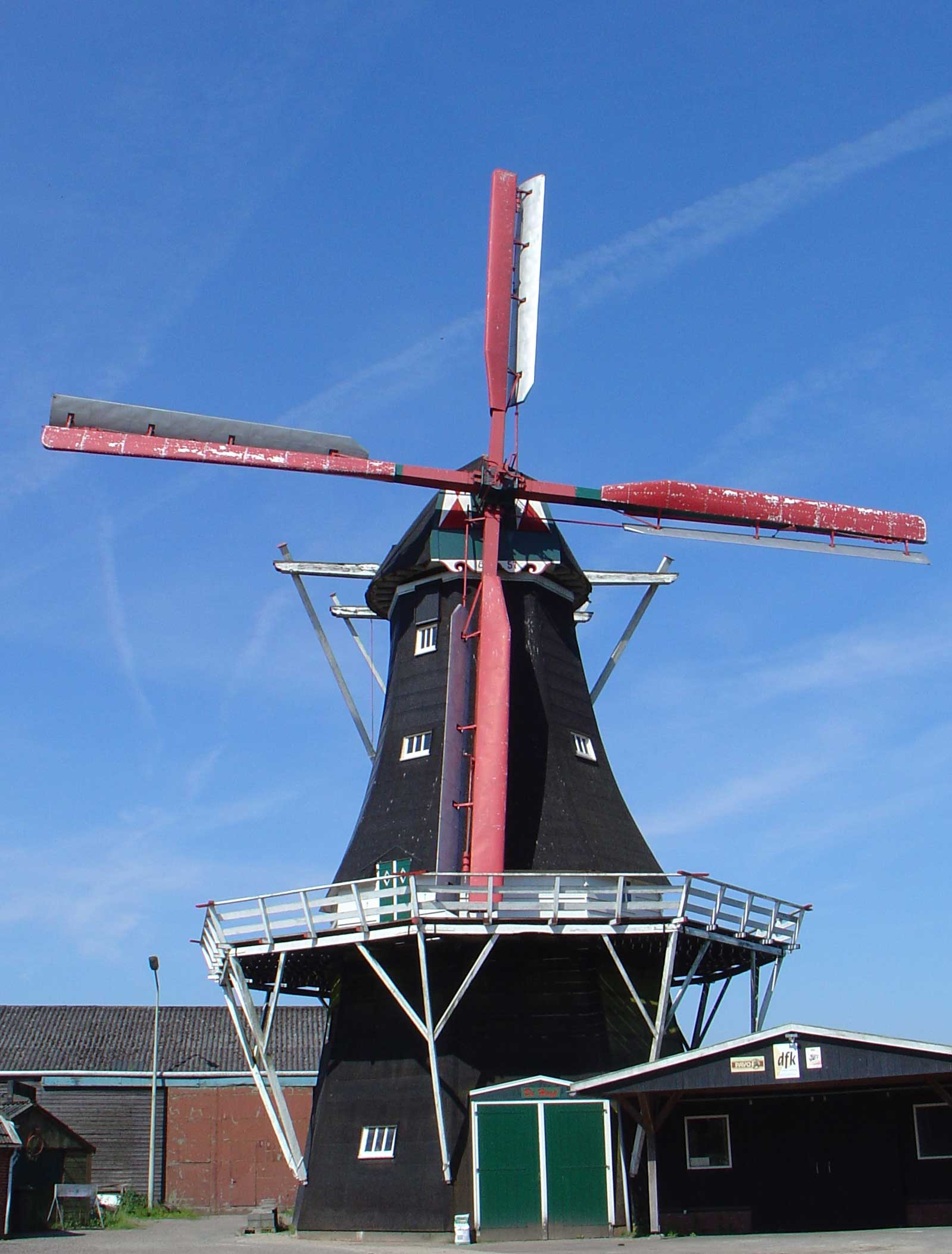
- De Hoop, June 2008

Origin
- Mill name: De Hoop
- Mill location: Asserstraat 36, 9331 JD, Norg
- Coordinates: 53°04′03″N 6°27′27″E
- Operator(s): Het Drentse Landschap
- Year built: 1857

Information
- Purpose: Corn mill
- Type: Smock mill
- Storeys: Two-storey smock
- Base storeys: Three-storey base
- Smock sides: Eight sides
- No. of sails: Four sails
- Type of sails: Bilau sails
- Windshaft: Cast iron
- Winding: Tailpole and winch
- No. of pairs of millstones: One pair
- Size of millstones: 1.40 metres (4 ft 7 in) diameter

De Hoop (English The Hope) is a smock mill in Norg, Drenthe, the Netherlands. It was built in 1857 and is listed as a Rijksmonument, number 30781.

== History ==
This mill was built in 1857 for Hermannus Beins, who died in 1861. It was originally a barley mill and had Patent sails. In 1862 the mill was in the ownership of Egge Dijkhuizen, passing to Thijs Mulder and then the Hoff brothers. They sold the mill in 1873 to A de Vries for ƒ9,000 on the condition that a post mill he owned which stood on the road to Een was demolished.

The mill was sold in 1878 to Ludernus Warmelts and passed to his son Hendrik Warmolts. During their ownership the mill was converted to a corn mill. In 1935, one pair of Patent sails was replaced with a pair of Bilau sails, although the stock soon broke. In 1937, the mill was fitted with four new Bilau sails by millwrights Fabrikaat Wijnveen of Voorthuizen, Gelderland. In 1943, the sails were damaged by gunfire from fighter aircraft. They were repaired as the mill was needed to produce flour to feed the villagers of Norg. In 1962, owner Jan Snijders restored the mill. A further restoration of the then nameless mill took place in 1982, during which the shed which formerly housed an engine was demolished. By the 1990s the mill was again in need of repairs. It turned for the last time on 24 August 1996 before a further restoration was undertaken. In 1997 the mill was bought by Gemeente Norg and resold to Molenstichting Drenthe (English: Drenthe Mills Society). Restoration to full working order was completed in 2000. This is the only windmill in the Netherlands fitted with Bilau sails.

== Description ==
De Hoop is what the Dutch describe as an "achtkante stellingmolen". It is a two-storey smock mill on a three-storey brick base. The stage is at second-floor level, 6.20 metres (20 ft 4 in) above ground level. The smock and cap are clad in Dakleer. The mill is winded by a tailpole and winch. The four Bilau sails have a span of 21.35 metres (70 ft 1 in) are carried in a cast-iron windshaft, which was cast by Nederlandse Stoomboot Maatschappij, Fyenoord in 1844. The windshaft was originally cast solid and had to be bored through to take Patent sails at a later date. The windshaft also carries the brake wheel, which has 62 cogs. The brake wheel drives the wallower (32 cogs) at the top of the upright shaft. At the bottom of the upright shaft the great spur wheel, which has 80 cogs, drives the 1.40 metres (4 ft 7 in) diameter French Burr millstones via a lantern pinion stone nut which has 24 staves.

== Millers ==
- Hermannus Beins 1857-61
- Egge Dijkhuizen 1862-
- Thijs Mulder
- L & R Hoff -1873
- A de Vries 1873-
- Luderus Warmelts
- Hendrik Warmelts
- Jan Snijders

Reference for above:-

== Public access ==
De Hoop is open on Saturdays from 12:00 to 16:00, alternating with Noorderveld, the other windmill in Norg.
