= De Groeve =

- Village
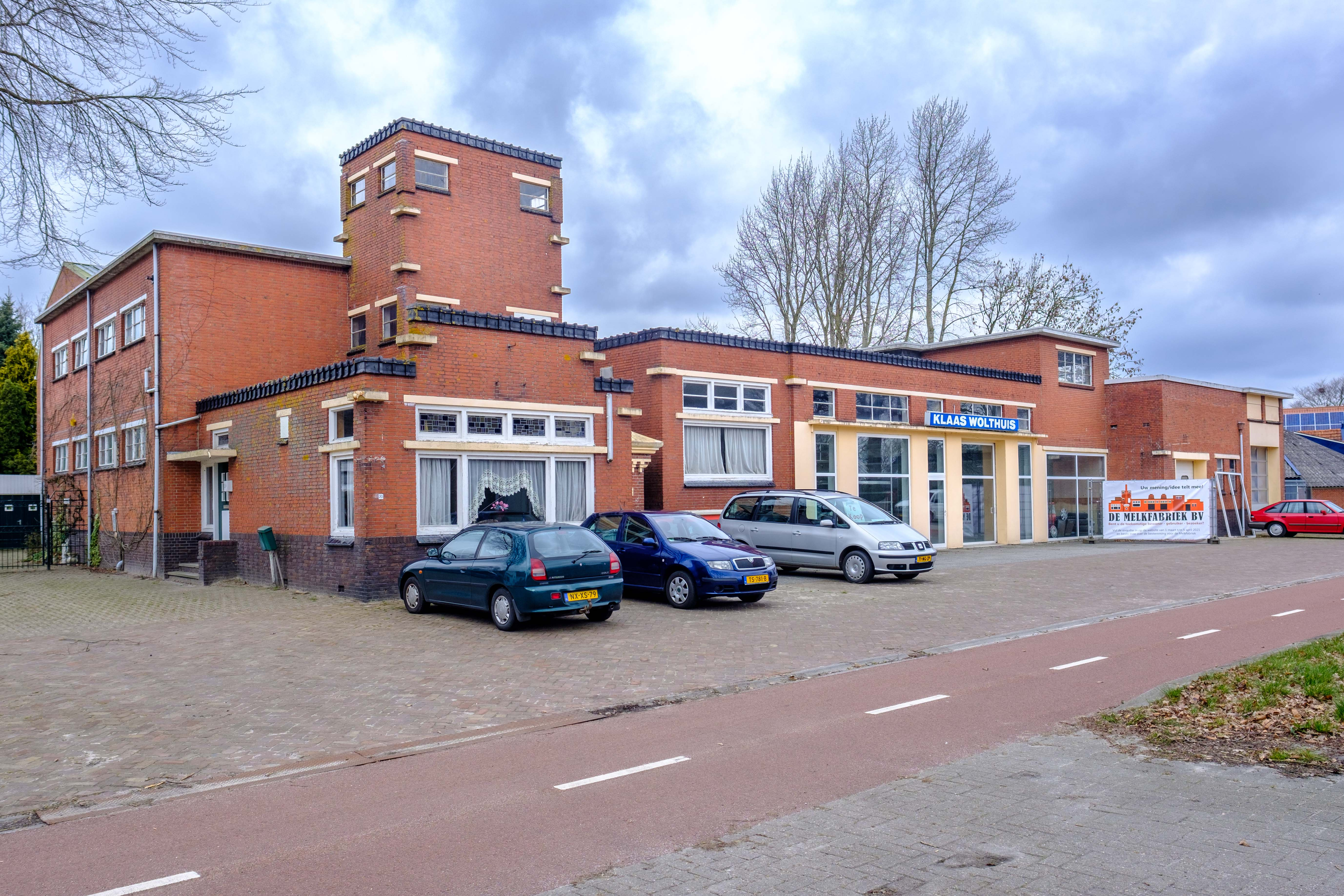
- Dairy factory

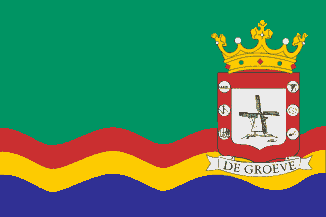
- Flag

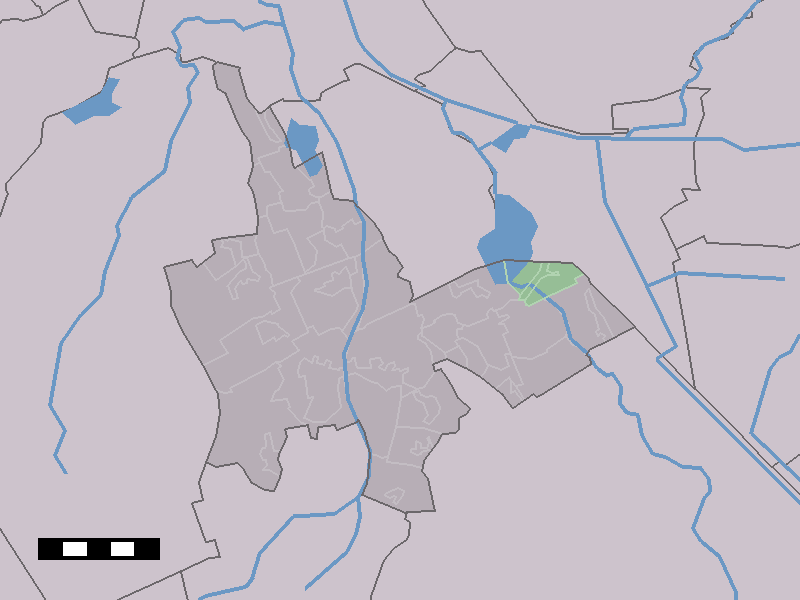
- De Groeve in the municipality of Tynaarlo.

- Location of the village in the province of Drenthe De Groeve (Netherlands)
- Coordinates: 53°7′N 6°43′E
- Country: Netherlands
- Province: Drenthe
- Municipality: Tynaarlo

Area
  - Total: 4.05 km^{2} (1.56 sq mi)
- Elevation: 1.9 m (6.2 ft)

Population (2021)
  - Total: 480
  - Density: 120/km^{2} (310/sq mi)
- Time zone: UTC+1 (CET)
  - Summer (DST): UTC+2 (CEST)
- Postal code: 9473
- Dialing code: 050

De Groeve is a village in the Dutch province of Drenthe. It is a part of the municipality of Tynaarlo, and lies about 15 km southeast of Groningen.

== History ==
The village was first mentioned in 1285 as Growe, and means "dug canal" which refers to the Oostermoersche Vaart which is connected to the Zuidlaardermeer. The canal was dug by the monks of the Aduard Abbey to transport peat. The village used to be known as Midlaarderveen as well.

De Groeve was home to 99 people in 1840. The polder mill Boezemvriend was built in 1871. In 1934, an electric motor was installed, and the wind mill started to decay. The outside was restored between 1962 and 1963, however it was unable to function. In 1990, it was restored on the inside.

In 1955, the pumping station Oostermoer was constructed. It used to contain two diesel engines and one electric motor. In 1994, one of the diesel engines was replaced by an electric motor. The pumping station can pump 500 cubic metres (18,000 cu ft) per minute.

A wooden building called "Post Hotel" was built in 1950 to intercept radio messages from the Warsaw Pact. In 1980, it became obsolete and since 2011 houses a youth centre.

== Gallery ==
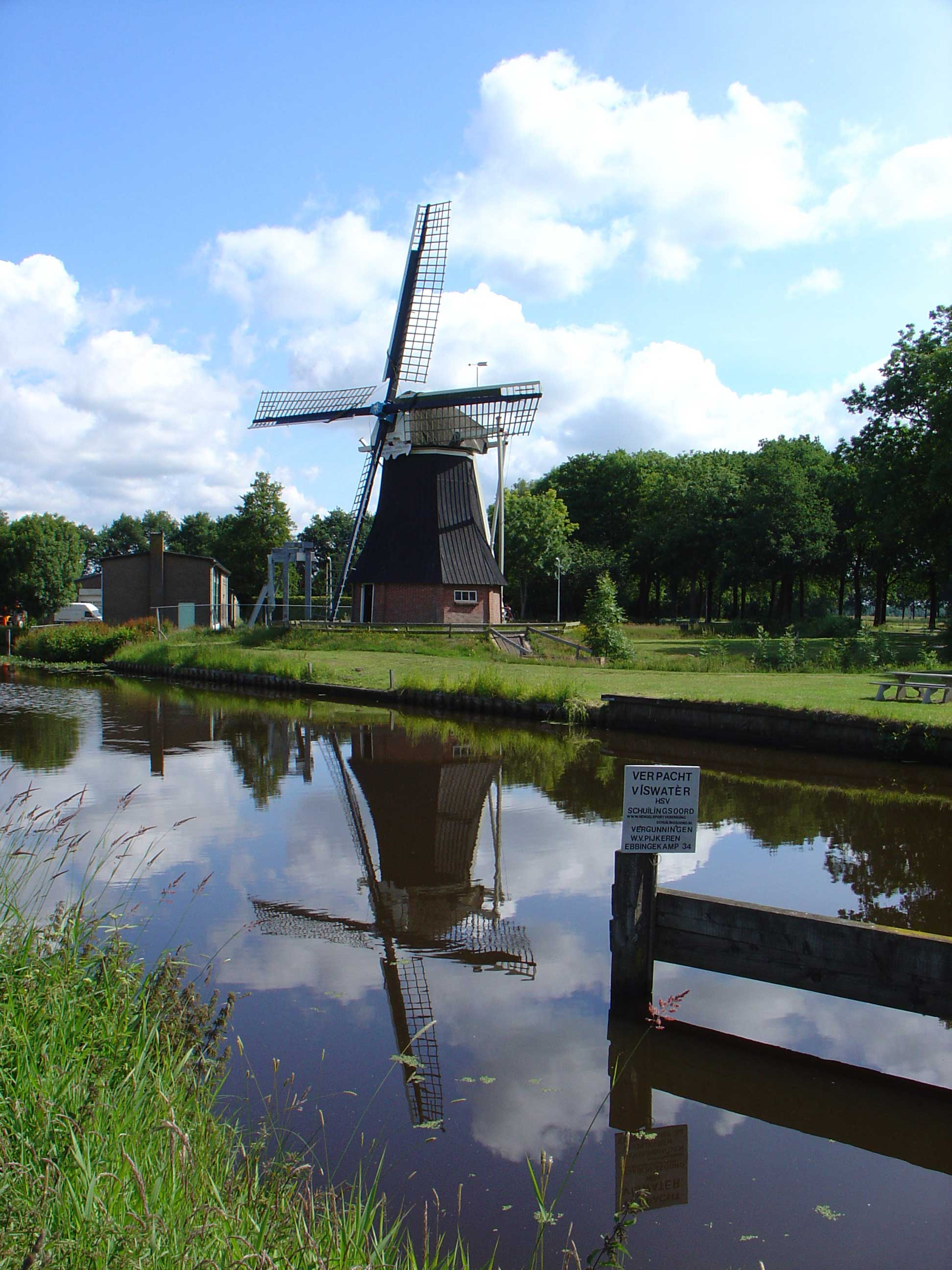
De Boezemvriend or Molen van De Groeve in De Groeve

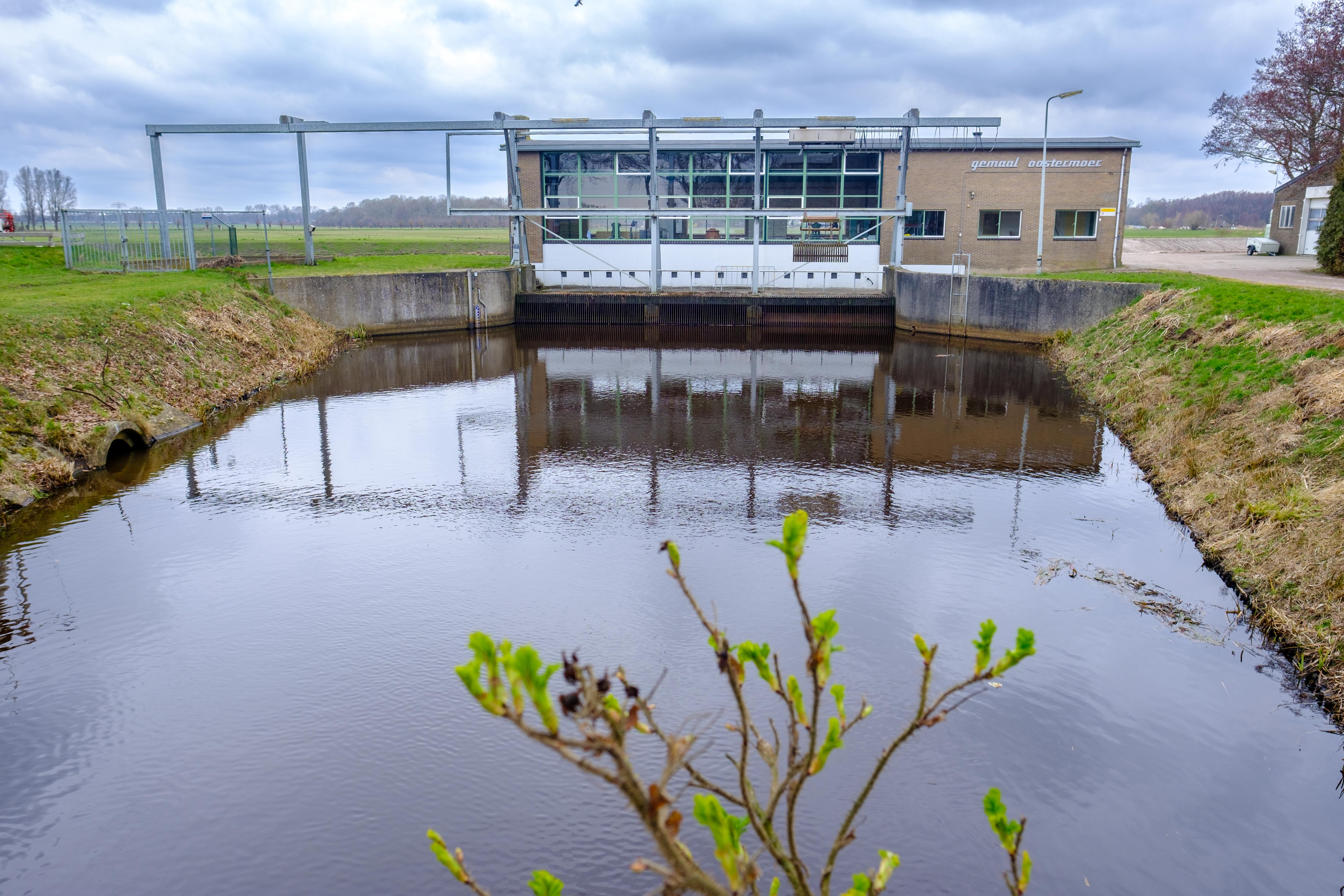
Pumping station Oostermoer

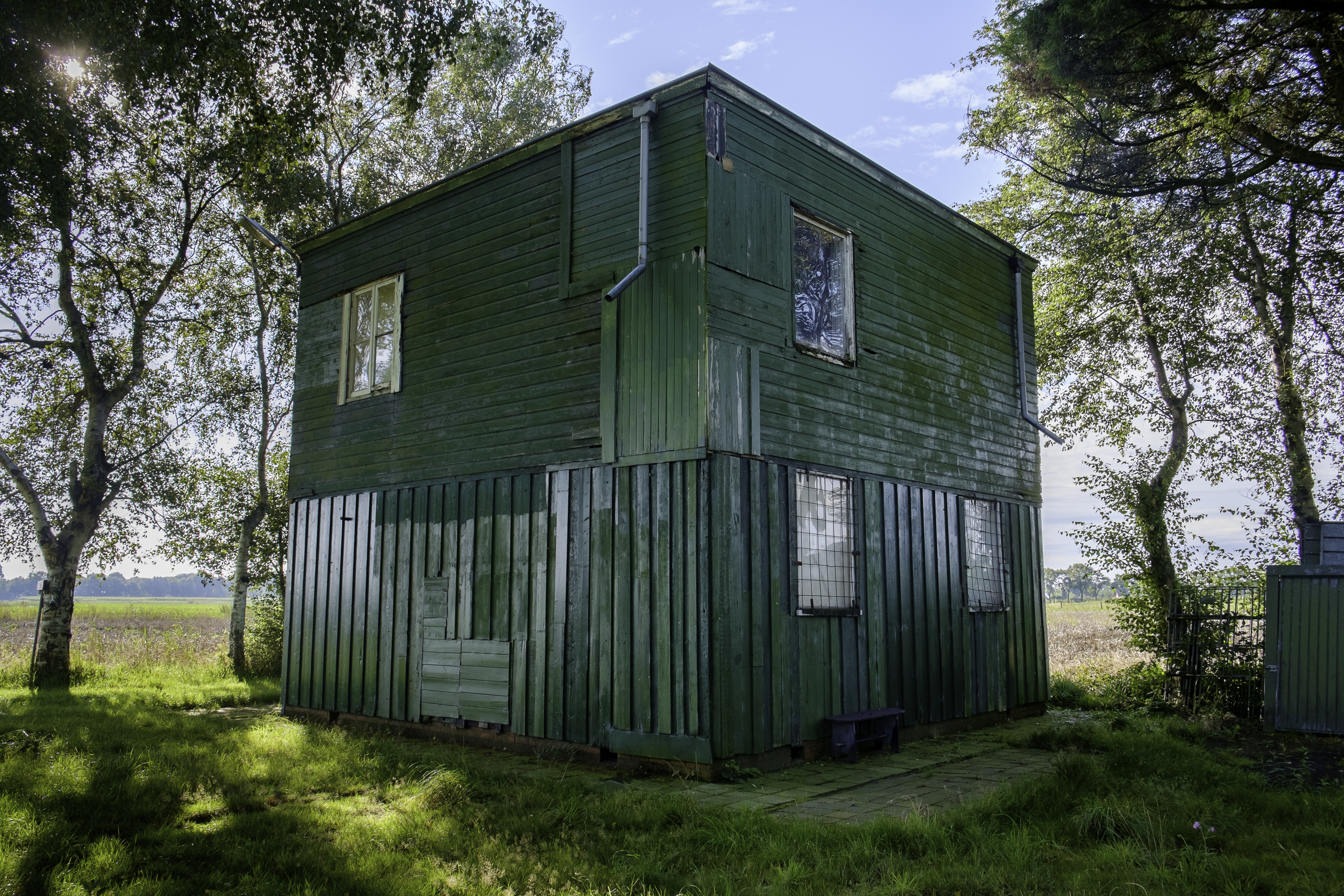
Post Hotel
