= Boezemvriend =

Windmill in De Groeve, Netherlands

De Boezemvriend
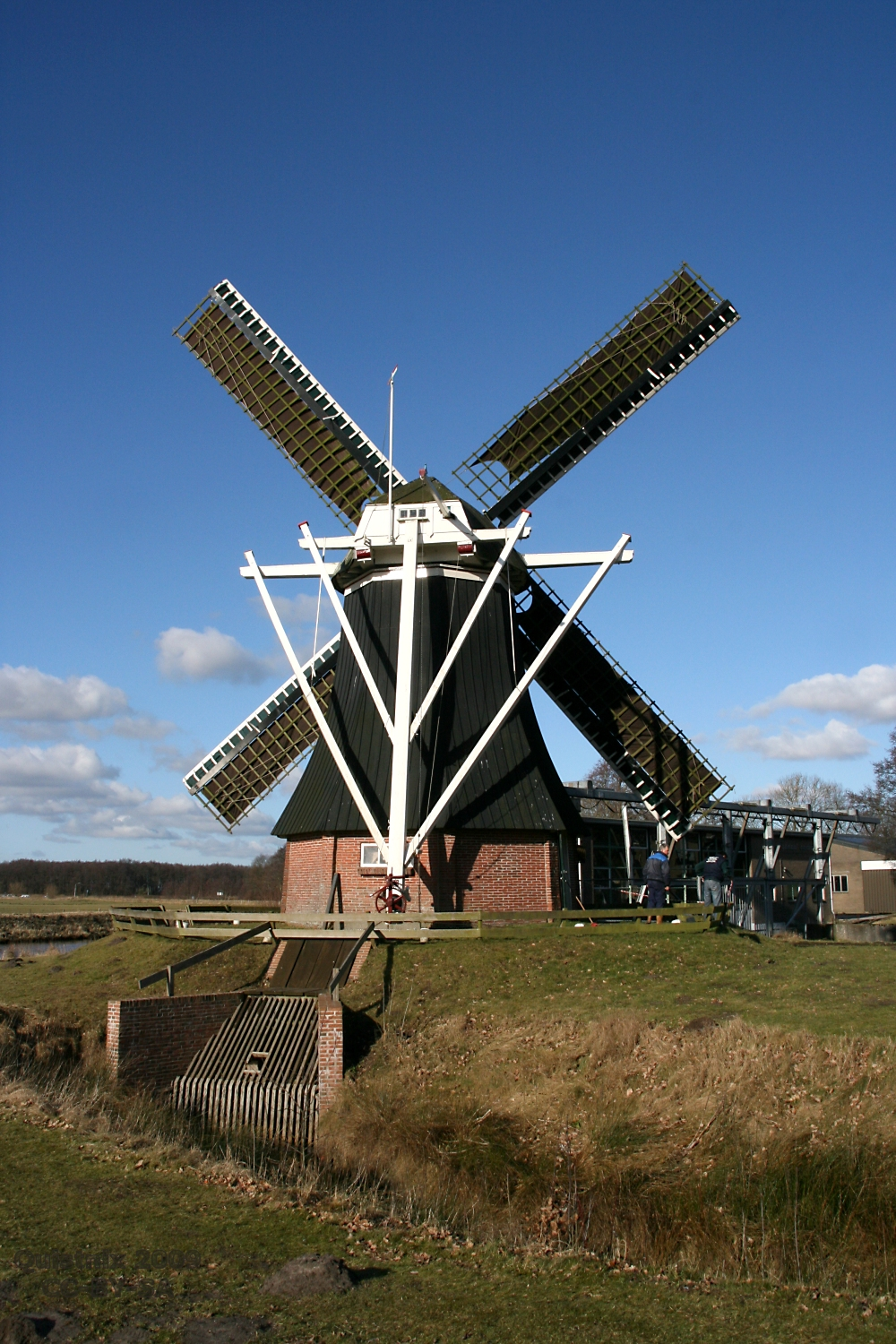

Origin
- Mill name: De Boezemvriend; Molen van De Groeve
- Mill location: Hunzeweg 4, 9473 TE, De Groeve
- Coordinates: 52°06′23″N 6°42′16″E
- Operator(s): Gemeente Tynaarlo
- Year built: 1871

Information
- Purpose: Drainage mill
- Type: Smock mill
- Storeys: Three-storey smock
- Base storeys: Single-storey smock
- Smock sides: Eight sides
- No. of sails: Four sails
- Type of sails: Common sails
- Windshaft: Cast iron
- Winding: Tailpole and winch
- Type of pump: Archimedes' screw
- Other information: Formerly fitted with Patent sails. The only drainage windmill remaining in Drenthe (tjaskers excluded).

De Boezemvriend or Molen van De Groeve is a smock mill in De Groeve, Netherlands which has been restored to working order. It was built in 1871. The mill is listed as a Rijksmonument, number 41097.

== History ==
De Boezemvriend was built in 1871 by millwright P Medendorp, of Zuidlaren, replacing an earlier mill. It drained the Zuidlaren Polder. The mill worked until 1934, when an electric motor was installed. The mill was derelict in 1960. The windshaft had dropped and the end of a sail resting on the ground. The mill was restored as a landmark over the winter of 1962-63 by millwright Medendorp of Zuidlaren, grandson of the original builder. It had formerly been equipped with Patent sails, but these were not restored. Further restoration to working order took place over the winter of 1989-90. The mill was officially reopened on 5 April 1990. The mill was named De Boezemvriend in 1991.

== Description ==
De Boezemvriend is what the Dutch described as an achtkante grondzeiler - a smock mill without a stage. It has a single-storey brick base with a three-storey smock. The smock and cap are boarded, with vertical boards on the smock. The four Common sails are carried on a cast-iron windshaft which was made in 1894 by The Hague millwrights Prins van Oranje. The sails have a span of 20.10 metres (65 ft 11 in). The brakewheel has 59 cogs. It drives the wallower (27 cogs) at the top of the upright shaft. At the bottom of the upright shaft the crown wheel (36 cogs) drives the Archimedes' screw via a gear with 35 cogs.

== Public access ==
De Boezemvriend is open by appointment.
