= Wezuperbrug =

- Village
- Location within Drenthe Location within Netherlands
- Coordinates: 52.8405°N 6.7197°E
- Country: Netherlands
- Province: Drenthe
- Municipality: Coevorden

Area
  - Total: 0.81 km^{2} (0.31 sq mi)
- Elevation: 19 m (62 ft)

Population (2021)
  - Total: 165
  - Density: 200/km^{2} (530/sq mi)
- Time zone: UTC+1 (CET)
  - Summer (DST): UTC+2 (CEST)
- Postal code: 7853
- Dialing code: 0591

Wezuperbrug is a village in the Netherlands. It is a part of the Coevorden municipality in Drenthe.

It was first mentioned in 1942 Wezeperbrug, and refers to the bridge over the Oranjekanaal near Wezup. The settlement started in the late-19th century after the canal was dug, and was originally called Nieuw-Wezup.
