= Wezup =

- Village
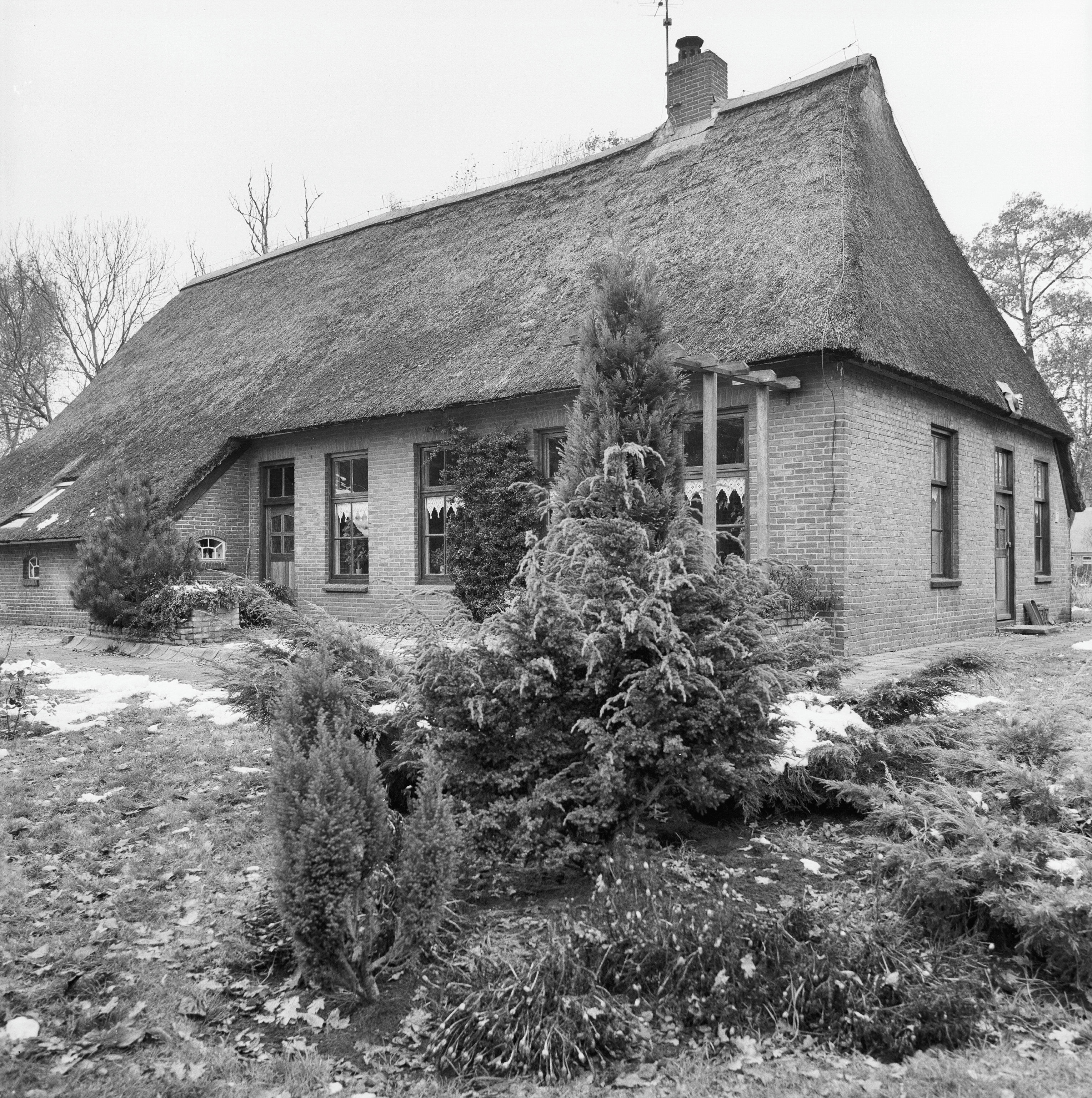
- Farm in Wezup

- Location within Drenthe Location within Netherlands
- Coordinates: 52°48′43″N 6°43′9″E
- Country: Netherlands
- Province: Drenthe
- Municipality: Coevorden

Area
  - Total: 0.68 km^{2} (0.26 sq mi)
- Elevation: 18 m (59 ft)

Population (2021)
  - Total: 170
  - Density: 250/km^{2} (650/sq mi)
- Time zone: UTC+1 (CET)
  - Summer (DST): UTC+2 (CEST)
- Postal code: 7852
- Dialing code: 0591
- Website: wezup.info

Wezup is a village in the Netherlands that is a part of the Coevorden municipality in Drenthe. North of Wezup is Wezuperbrug and to the east is Zweeloo.

Wezup is an esdorp which was first mentioned in 1284 as Wesepe, and means "brook through the meadow". In 1488, it became a boermarke, a communal and private land which was autonomous. In 1840, it was home to 168 people.
