= List of Rijksmonuments =

This is a list of the more notable Rijksmonuments (national heritage sites) in the Netherlands. The list is sorted by province. There are over 60,000 Rijksmonuments in the Rijksmonumentenregister (national heritage register).

Emblem for national monument introduced in 2014

== Drenthe ==
- See List of Rijksmonuments in Drenthe

== Flevoland ==
- See List of Rijksmonuments in Flevoland or Category:Rijksmonuments in Flevoland

== Friesland ==
- See List of Rijksmonuments in Friesland

== Gelderland ==
- See List of Rijksmonuments in Gelderland

== Groningen ==
- See List of Rijksmonuments in Groningen (province) or Category:Rijksmonuments in Groningen (province)

== Limburg ==
Rijksmonument	Type	Location	Description	Photo

- See List of Rijksmonuments in Limburg or Category:Rijksmonuments in Limburg

== North Brabant ==
Rijksmonument	Location	Type	Description	Photo
Aalstermolen	Aalst	Windmill	Tower mill built in 1936.	
Croy Castle	Aarle-Rixtel	Castle	C15th castle.	
Gertrudiskerk	Bergen op Zoom	Church	C14th and later church	
Breda Castle	Breda	Castle	C15th castle.	
Grote Kerk	Breda	Church	C15th church	
Koepelgevangenis	Breda	Prison	Prison built in 1886	
Annemie	Eindhoven	Windmill	Tower mill built in 1891.	
John S. Thompsonbrug	Grave / Nederasselt	Bridge	Bridge built in 1929.	
Van Abbemuseum	Eindhoven	Museum	Museum established in 1936.	
Nemerlaer Castle	Haaren	Castle	C14th castle.	
Heeswijk Castle	Heeswijk	Castle	C11th castle.	
Heeze Castle	Heeze	Castle	C17th castle	
De Adriaan	Meerveldhoven	Windmill	Tower mill built in 1906.	
Post mill Rosmalen	Molenhoek	Windmill	Post mill built in 1732	
Molen van Aerden	Nispen	Windmill	Tower mill built in 1850.	
St. Paul's Abbey	Oosterhout	Abbey	C20th abbey.	
Watermill at Opwetten	Watermill	Opwetten	C18th corn, fulling, oil and saw mill	
Oudenbosch Basilica	Oudenbosch	Church	C19th church.	
Saint Lambertchurch	Rosmalen	Church	C14th and later church	
Aan de Pegstukken	Windmill	Schijndel	Tower mill built in 1845	
St. John's Cathedral	's-Hertogenbosch	Cathedral	C13th-C16th cathedral.	
De Toonzaal	's-Hertogensbosch	Synagogue	Synagogue built in 1823	
Assumburg	Steenbergen	Windmill	Smock mill built in 1897.	
De Arend	Terheijden	Windmill	Tower mill built in 1742.	
Watermill at Kollen	't Koll	Watermill	Watermill built in 1681	
De Arend	Wouw	Windmill	Tower mill built in 1825	
De Akkermolen	Zundert	Windmill	Post mill built c.1605.	

== North Holland ==
Rijksmonument	Type	Location	Description	Photo
American Hotel	Hotel	Amsterdam	A hotel built in 1900.	
Centraal Station	Railway station	Amsterdam	The main railway station in Amsterdam. Built in 1889.	
Astoria	Offices	Amsterdam	An Art Nouveau office block built in 1905.	
Castle Brederode	Castle	Santpoort-Zuid	A castle built by the Lords of Brederode in the second half of the 13th century.	
De Duif	Church	Amsterdam	A Roman Catholic church built in 1858.	
De Krijtberg	Church	Amsterdam	A Roman Catholic church built in 1883.	
De Schoolmeester; No. 40013	Windmill	Westzaan	A smock mill built in 1692, restored to working order. It is the only surviving wind powered paper mill in the world.	
Hollandsche Manege	Riding school	Amsterdam	Offices, accommodation and stables built in 1883.	
Lange Jaap	Lighthouse	Huisduinen	A cast iron lighthouse built in 1878	
Muiderslot	Castle	Muiden	A castle build by Floris V, to guard the mouth of the river Vecht.	
Museum De Cruquius	Pumping station	Cruquius	A steam powered pumping station built c. 1850. Houses the largest stationary steam engine (a beam engine) in the world. Also a World Heritage Site.	
Nieuwe Kerk	Church	Amsterdam	A church dating from the 15th century. Used for Royal Inaugurations and Royal Weddings. Also used as an exhibition venue and for organ recitals.	
Noorderkerk	Church	Amsterdam	A Protestant church built in the 1620s.	
Olympisch Stadion	Stadium	Amsterdam	A stadium built for the 1928 Summer Olympics and later used by AFC Ajax until 1996.	
Onderlinge van 1719 u.a.	Offices	Haarlem	Residential building from 1870. Good example of Eclectic style by architect A. van der Steur. Seat of an insurance firm established in 1719	
Oost-Indisch Huis	Offices	Amsterdam	An early 17th-century office block. Former headquarters of the Dutch East India Company.	
Oosterkerk	Church	Amsterdam	A former Protestant church built between 1669 and 1671.	
Oude Kerk	Church	Amsterdam	A former Roman Catholic and current Protestant church. It was consecrated in 1306. The oldest parish church in Amsterdam.	
Portugees-Israëlietische Synagoge	Synagogue	Amsterdam	A synagogue built in 1671.	
Koninklijk Paleis; Paleis op de Dam	Palace	Amsterdam	Originally built as the City Hall in 1655. first used as a Royal Palace by Konig Louis I and still used as such by the current monarch.	
Smedestraat 33	Doorway	Haarlem	The doorway's brickwork, including a round false window, is from the second half of the 17th century.	
Stadsschouwburg	Theatre	Amsterdam	A theatre built between 1892 and 1894. Former home of De Nederlandse Opera.	
Statue of Jan Pieterszoon Coen	Statue	Hoorn	Statue of Jan Pieterszoon Coen, made in 1887, placed in 1893.	
Stoomgemaal Vier Noorder Koggen	Pumping station	Medemblik	Steam powered pumping station near the city of Medemblik. Build in 1869 and expanded in 1907, to obsolete 25 windmills.	
Grote or Sint-Laurenskerk	Church	Alkmaar	A gothic church dedicated to St. Lawrence, now a Protestant church. Contains the tomb of Floris V, Count of Holland.	
Vondelpark	Urban park	Amsterdam	A public park established in 1865 and extended in 1877.	
Westerkerk	Church	Amsterdam	A Protestant church built between 1620 and 1633. Burial place of Rembrandt.	
Zuiderkerk	Church	Amsterdam	A former Protestant church built between 1603 and 1611. In use as a church until 1970, now an information centre.	

- See List of Rijksmonuments in North Holland or Category:Rijksmonuments in North Holland

== Overijssel ==
Rijksmonument	Type	Location	Description	Photo
Lebuïnuskerk	Church	Deventer	A former Gothic cathedral.	
Deventer Station	Railway station	Deventer	A railway station built in 1865.	
Tuinen Mien Ruys	Complex of gardens.	Dedemsvaart	25 gardens by Mien Ruys	
Great Synagogue	Synagogue	Deventer	A Neorenaissance synagogue from the 19th century.	
Sint-Nicolaas- of Bergkerk	Church	Deventer	A former Romanesque church from the 13th century.	

- See List of Rijksmonuments in Overijssel or Category:Rijksmonuments in Overijssel

== South Holland ==
Rijksmonument	Type	Location	Description	Photo
Baden Powelllaan 12	Mansion	Rotterdam	18th century mansion	De Heuvel mansion at Baden Powelllaan 12
Feijenoord Stadion	Stadium	Rotterdam	A sports stadium completed in 1937, home to Feyenoord football club.	
Groothandelsgebouw	Offices	Rotterdam	An office block completed in 1953, one of the first major buildings built in Rotterdam after the Second World War.	
Het Slaakhuis	Offices	Rotterdam	An office block built in 1955. Former headquarters of newspaper Het Vrije Volk and now used as a squat.	
Lijnbaan	Street	Rotterdam	The main shopping street in Rotterdam, opened in 1953.	
Museum Boijmans Van Beuningen	Museum	Rotterdam	An art museum established in 1847. Houses the collections of Frans Jacob Otto Boijmans and Daniël George van Beuningen.	
Pelgrimvaderskerk	Church	Rotterdam	A former Roman Catholic and current Protestant church. Established in 1417. The current building dates from 1671.	
Van Nellefabriek	Factory	Rotterdam	A former factory in the Nieuwe Bouwen style. Built between 1927 and 1929, it is currently used as offices. Under consideration for World Heritage Site status.	
Vrouwekerk	Church	Leiden	The ruins of a Walloon church dating to 1406 and demolished in the early 19th century.	
Wereldmuseum	Museum	Rotterdam	A museum established in 1883.	
Witte Huis	Offices	Rotterdam	An Art Nouveau office block built in 1898. It was the tallest building in Europe when built. One of the few buildings in central Rotterdam to survive German bombing during the Second World War.	

- See List of Rijksmonuments in South Holland or Category:Rijksmonuments in South Holland

== Utrecht ==
Rijksmonument	Type	Location	Description	Photo
Academiegebouw	Utrecht University main building	Utrecht	University building built in 1891.	
Domtoren	Church bell tower	Utrecht	Bell tower of the Dom church in the centre of Utrecht.	
Kasteel de Haar	Castle	Utrecht	Castle located near Haarzuilens, built in 1892.	
Landgoed Persijn	Estate	Maartensdijk	19th century Buitenplaats.	
Tivoli complex	Former pop venue	Utrecht	Former Burgerweeshuis (municipal orphanage) and former Regulierenklooster (Monastery of Canons Regular, parts of the building).	
Utrecht Post Office	Utrecht Public Library	Utrecht	Former national main post office	

- See List of Rijksmonuments in Utrecht (province) or Category:Rijksmonuments in Utrecht (province)

== Zeeland ==
Rijksmonument	Type	Location	Description	Photo

- See List of Rijksmonuments in Zeeland, List of national heritage sites in Terneuzen or Category:Rijksmonuments in Zeeland
