= De Adriaan =

De Adriaan may refer to:

- De Adriaan, Haarlem, a windmill in Haarlem, Netherlands
- De Adriaan, Veldhoven, a windmill in Veldhoven, Netherlands
