= Harmen Krul =

Dutch politician (born 1994)

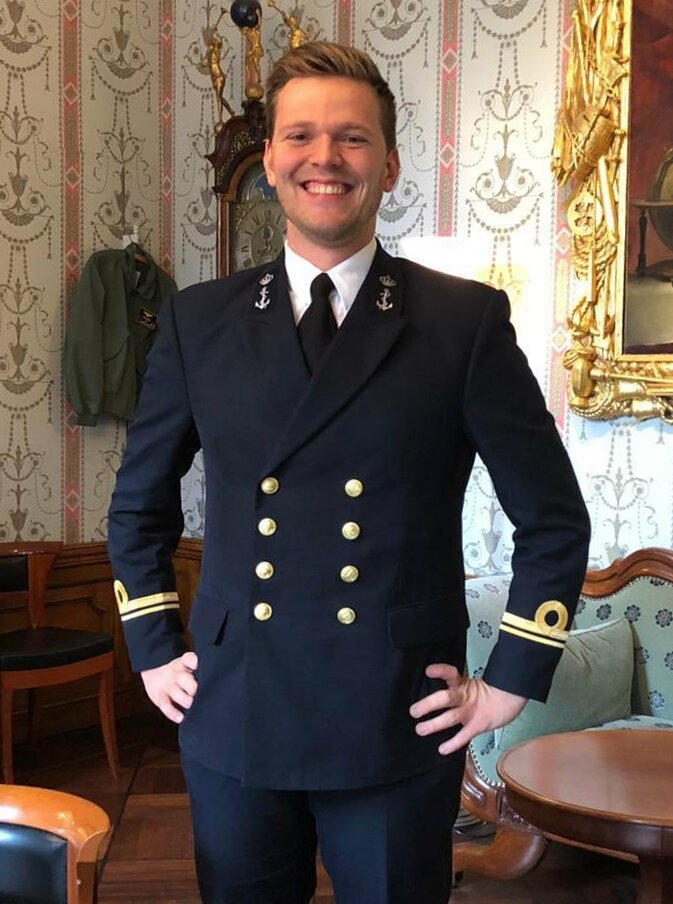
- Krul in his navy uniform (c. 2020)

Fourth Deputy Speaker of the House of Representatives
- Incumbent
- Assumed office 20 November 2025
- Preceded by: Thom van Campen

Member of the House of Representatives
- Incumbent
- Assumed office 7 February 2023
- Preceded by: Raymond Knops

Member of the Den Helder Municipal Council
- In office 29 March 2018 – 15 May 2023
- Succeeded by: Jane Lobles

Personal details
- Born: Harmen Marinus Krul; 19 May 1994 (age 32) Blaricum, Netherlands
- Party: Christian Democratic Appeal
- Children: 1
- Education: Royal Naval College
- Occupation: Navy officer; politician
- Website: harmenkrul.nl

Military service
- Allegiance: Netherlands
- Branch/service: Royal Netherlands Navy
- Years of service: 2013–2023 (Note: He was exempted from military duties in the years 2020–2023 as a result of his role at GOV|MHB.)
- Rank: Lieutenant
- Unit: Maritime Battle Staff; Surface Assault and Training Group

Harmen Marinus Krul (Dutch pronunciation: [ˈɦɑrmə(ŋ) ˈkrʏl]; born 19 May 1994) is a Dutch politician of the Christian Democratic Appeal (CDA) and a former Royal Netherlands Navy officer. Krul was mostly raised in Den Helder and joined the Royal Naval College in 2013 after graduating high school. He served as a naval officer, rising to the rank of lieutenant before becoming secretary on the boards of two professional associations for officers in 2020.

At the age of 23, Krul was elected to the Den Helder Municipal Council in 2018 after the CDA asked him to be its lead candidate. During the campaign, Krul criticized uncooperative behavior in local politics, and after his election, he was appointed vice chair of the council. Krul received a second term of office in 2022. He unsuccessfully ran as the party's youth candidate for the House of Representatives in the 2021 general election but in February 2023, he was appointed to the body after Raymond Knops resigned.

== Early life and naval career ==
Krul was born on 19 May 1994 in Blaricum in Gooi, the Netherlands, and grew up in nearby Eemnes. He has a sister. As a child, he moved to the village of Huisduinen in Den Helder, (Note: One source says he moved at age four, while another mentions he lived in Laren for six years.) from where his mother originated, and his father died when Krul was twelve. He attended Lyceum aan Zee high school, graduating with a VWO diploma, and he played football as a center-back at FC Den Helder.

In 2013, Krul attended the Royal Naval College in Den Helder. Five years later, he said he was pursuing a degree in digital business administration at the University of Amsterdam concurrent with his naval job. Krul served as part of the Maritime Battle Staff and as second lieutenant of the Surface Assault and Training Group (SATG), which provides logistical support and is based on the island Texel. He remained stationed there so he could attend municipal council meetings. In September 2020, Krul was promoted to the rank of lieutenant (OF-2). The same month, Krul left the SATG to serve as secretary of GOV|MHB, the professional association of officers and civilian personnel of the Dutch armed forces, and as editor-in-chief of its bulletin ProDef. He simultaneously joined one of its member organizations, the Royal Association of Naval Officers (KVMO), as secretary. Krul had already become a board member of the KVMO and chair of its youth group in 2018. Krul remained an active officer but was exempted from military duties, and upon his appointment to the House of Representatives in 2023, he left the navy, GOV|MHB, and the KVMO.

== Den Helder politics ==
=== 2018 election and coalition talks ===
According to Harmen Krul, he came from a leftist family but chose to join the Christian Democratic Appeal (CDA) because he valued personal responsibility and looking after others. He has also mentioned that the CDA's opposition to defense budget cuts attracted him, and he has called naval officer and Prime Minister Piet de Jong (1915–2016) his idol. In 2017, Krul was asked to give an introduction at a defense-themed CDA campaign event in Den Helder before that year's general election. His speech about the importance of the armed forces drew the attention of attending Member of Parliament (MP) Raymond Knops, who encouraged Krul to become politically active.

Having assisted the CDA's parliamentary group in the Den Helder Municipal Council, Krul was asked to be the party's lead candidate in March 2018 municipal elections. Parliamentary leader Roy Slort did not seek another term because of his job and family. At age 23, Krul was the fourth-youngest lead candidate in the election nationally and the youngest of his party. He supported a merger of municipalities in the Kop van North Holland region during the campaign, and he complained about the local politics of the last years, arguing in favor of more-constructive cooperation. The CDA became the second-largest party in the election behind the local Beter voor Den Helder party (BvDH; Better for Den Helder), winning five out of 31 seats compared to four in the previous election.

Krul was sworn in as a councilor on 29 March 2018. He was also appointed as vice chair of the council, presiding over meetings in the mayor's absence, and as chair of the credentials committee that investigates new council members. Krul was involved in talks to form a coalition government on behalf of the CDA; he wanted the VVD to join a coalition but BvDH opposed this. BvDH allowed the CDA to choose the first formateur but the CDA withdrew from the talks after it sensed distrust against it from the other participating parties. A second formateur Jan Nagel included the VVD in negotiations but they again failed after Krul discovered BvDH had been in a late stage of secretly forming a parallel coalition that excluded the CDA and the VVD. Krul said he felt betrayed and that those actions further damaged the reputation of Den Helder politics. Krul asked BvDH for the initiative for new coalition negotiations after another party withdrew from the secret coalition. BvDH, however, decided for a fourth time to lead the talks and a coalition agreement between seven parties, including BvDH and the CDA, was signed in late June. Den Helder's turbulent politics drew attention from national media outlets.

=== First term and re-election ===
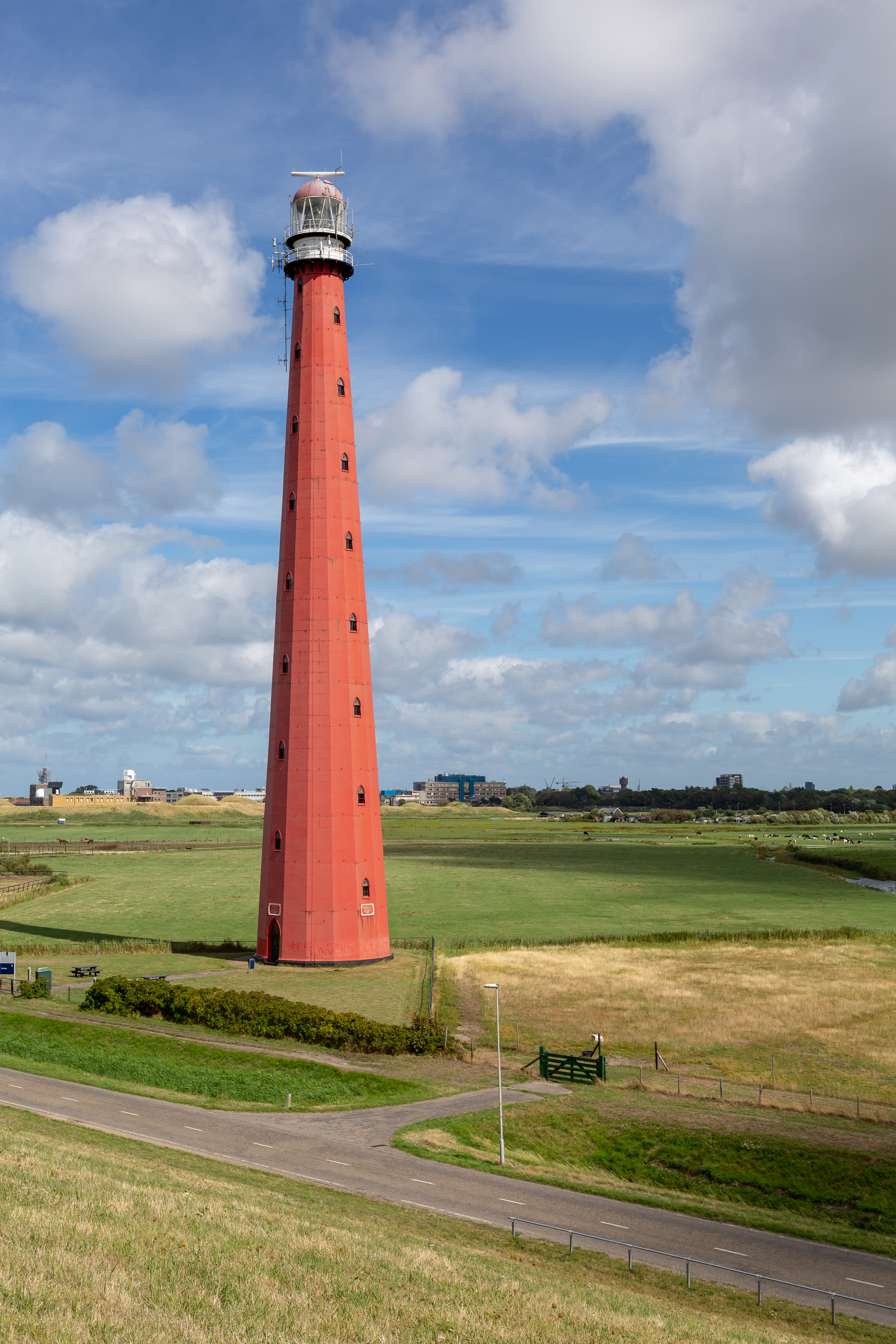
The 63-metre-tall (207 ft) Lange Jaap

As parliamentary leader, Krul successfully proposed the re-establishment of a youth council after ten years to advise the municipality. He also said farms should be allowed to house 50 rather that 30 seasonal workers to alleviate nuisances in residential areas. The municipal executive implemented the increase after a motion by Krul was carried. When for the same reason the executive proposed a €185,000 ($210,000 USD) minimum value for properties that could be rented to temporary workers, Krul suggested it should be raised to €200,000 ($220,000 USD). His amendment passed the council. In May 2018, the Seniorenpartij (Seniors' party) left the governing coalition while its alderman stayed on, switching parties. Krul initially found the latter move unacceptable but later accepted it. He proposed a recalibration of the coalition agreement and called for ideas from opposition parties. In 2021, when the government agency Rijkswaterstaat's severe neglect of the historic Den Helder lighthouse Lange Jaap was discovered, Krul contacted MP Pieter Omtzigt, who had been ejected from the CDA months before. Omtzigt subsequently questioned the minister. Krul introduced a motion urging the municipal executive to consider inclusiveness when granting permits for the arrival of Sinterklaas during the yearly namesake tradition. It was supported by a council majority. The Sinterklaas character's black-faced companion Zwarte Piet (Black Pete) part of the celebration, had been criticized nationally for racism.

Krul ran for a second term in March 2022, again as the CDA's lead candidate. He advocated a council-wide governing agreement in Den Helder instead of forming a new coalition government, and he promoted his national manifesto "Geen haat in de raad" (No hate in the council) in favor of cooperation in local politics. The CDA lost two of its five seats in the election amid national losses for the party. Krul retained his position as the council's vice chair. The CDA, fourth-largest party, joined the new eight-party coalition that was finalized in August after considerable infighting among two local parties. Krul continued to serve as parliamentary leader until early 2023, when he was appointed to the House of Representatives; he was succeeded by Edwin Krijns and he left the municipal council on 15 May.

== House of Representatives ==
Harmen Krul was placed 21st on the CDA's party list in the March 2021 general election, in which the members of the House of Representatives were chosen. Presenting himself as the party's youth candidate, Krul pleaded for the re-establishing of student grants to replace existing loans, for the reduction of flexible contracts in the labor market, and for the building of more homes to alleviate a housing shortage. He also advocated additional investments in defense and he wrote an opinion piece with MP Pieter Heerma in favor of a compulsory civilian service to bridge gaps between groups in society. Earlier advocacy by the CDA had led to a voluntary variant for people between the ages of 12 and 30 who would serve between 80 hours and six months. Krul also frequently appeared as a panel member on the BNR Nieuwsradio phone-in news show Breekt during the campaign season. In the election, the CDA won 15 seats – insufficient for Krul to receive a seat in the House. In Den Helder, one-third of CDA voters cast a preference vote for Krul, giving him nearly as many votes as party leader Wopke Hoekstra in the municipality.

In January 2023, MP Raymond Knops announced he would leave the House to join The Netherlands Industries for Defence & Security (NIDV). Due to his position on the party list, Krul was appointed as Knops' successor and was sworn into the House of Representatives on 7 February. He became the CDA's spokesperson for mobility, defense, and civilian service. (Note: Krul's specialties were initially infrastructure, mobility, water, the environment, and civilian service, but this was changed within a few months of his House appointment as part of a reshuffle to mobility, railways, air travel, defense (excluding veterans and NATO 2% defense spending norm), and civilian service.) Krul was re-elected in November 2023 as the CDA's fifth candidate, and his specialties changed to healthcare, education, culture, narcotics, and sex crimes. The House adopted a motion by Krul and Elke Slagt-Tichelman (GL/PvdA) urging the government to institute a smoking ban at sports fields, playgrounds, outdoor swimming pools, recreational attractions, and childcare facilities.

=== Committee assignments ===
==== 2023 term ====
- Committee for Defense
- Committee for European Affairs
- Committee for Foreign Affairs
- Committee for Infrastructure and Water Management
- Committee for the Interior
- Committee for Justice and Security
- Credentials committee

==== 2023–present term ====
- Committee for Education, Culture and Science
- Committee for Digital Affairs
- Committee for Health, Welfare and Sport

== Personal life ==
As a Member of Parliament, Krul continued to live in Den Helder. His partner was a naval officer as of 2020, and their first son was born in October 2022.

== Electoral history ==
Electoral history of Harmen Krul
Year	Body	Party	Pos.	Votes	Result		Ref.
Year	Body	Party	Pos.	Votes	Party seats	Individual	Ref.
2018	Den Helder Municipal Council	Christian Democratic Appeal	1	1,420	5	Won	
2021	House of Representatives	Christian Democratic Appeal	21	1,985	15	Lost (Note: Krul was appointed to the body later during the term due to a vacancy.)	
2022	Den Helder Municipal Council	Christian Democratic Appeal	1	959	3	Won	
2023	Provincial Council of North Holland	Christian Democratic Appeal	8 (Note: Krul participated as a lijstduwer.)	203	2	Lost	
2023	House of Representatives	Christian Democratic Appeal	5	2,618	5	Won	
2025	House of Representatives	Christian Democratic Appeal	5	4,002	18	Won	
2026	Den Helder Municipal Council	Christian Democratic Appeal	22	97	4	Lost	
