= Rudi Koegler =

Dutch painter (born 1931)

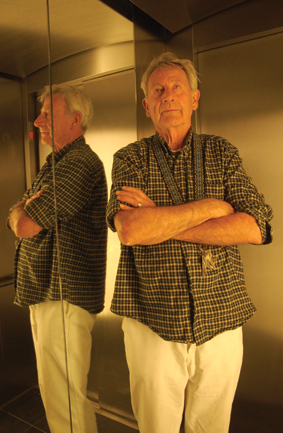
Rudi Koegler

Rudi Koegler (born 1931 in Amsterdam) is a Dutch painter. His work is characterized by a development from figurative art to abstract art, and by the recurrent themes of movement and light. He taught at the Casimirlyceum in Amstelveen and at high schools in Zwolle. For a long time he worked closely together with Jaap Hillenius.

== Periods ==
Koegler's work can be divided in four periods.

- During the first period, from 1957 to 1970, the focus is on expressionistic landscapes. The used technique is oil-paint à la prime.
- In his second period, from 1970 to 1975, Koegler's subject is the emotion evoked by a human being in a space. As expressive devices he uses direction, volume, rhythm and color.
- The theme of the third period, 1975–1985, is the color of light, reflected by water and vegetation. Direction and shape of brushstrokes obtain a meaning in relation to their color.
- From 1985 until present time Koegler creates complex rhythmical fabrics of visual elements. The influence of music during this period is considerable.

== Exhibitions ==
- 1959 - Zwolle, Hopmanhuis
- 1960 - Zwolle, De Nijvere Konste
- 1977 - Amstelveen, Aemstelle
- 1980 - Westzaan, Eck, Wiel
- 1981 - Hoorn, Alkmaar, Zaandam, Bergen
- 1998 - Cobramuseum, Amstelveen
- 2009 - Chassékerk, Amsterdam

== Bibliography ==
- Ode aan de Rondehoep (Tribute to the Rondehoep), Amsterdam, 2000.
- Rudi Koegler - Tekenleraar met het oog op kunst (Tutor with a view to art), Amsterdam, 2009. ISBN 978-94-90621-01-8
