= List of Rijksmonuments in Groningen (province) =

This is a list of Rijksmonuments in Groningen.

== Appingedam ==
Description	Original function^{?}	Built	Architect	Location	Coordinates^{?}	No.^{?}	Image
Filadelfia	House	c. 1800		Broerstraat 2-4	53°19′20″N 6°51′22″E	8207	
Liberated Reformed church (Synagogue before 1945)	Church or part of church	1801		Broerstraat 6	53°19′20″N 6°51′22″E	8208	
Lime-kiln	Industry	2nd half 19th century		Dijkhuizenweg 28	53°19′12″N 6°50′58″E	8209	
Left basement building under transverse gable roof with on the right a low floor	Workshop	13th century (core)		Dijkstraat 30	53°19′14″N 6°51′27″E	8210	
Building with low floor and second floor under deep gable roof with rear house and gazebo	Workshop	14th or 15th century (core); 18th century (rear house)		Dijkstraat 32	53°19′14″N 6°51′28″E	8211	Upload Photo
Corner Building under transverse gable roof against a top-gable roof with narrow Groninger-style windows	Workshop			Dijkstraat 34	53°19′14″N 6°51′28″E	8212	
Five bays wide, large building under high hipped roof with corner chimneys and a big cornice	Staff residence	1750-1800		Gouden Pand 1	53°19′16″N 6°51′22″E	8214	
Building under transverse gable roof with narrow carved consoles to the fascia	House	possibly Middle ages (core)		Gouden Pand 5	53°19′16″N 6°51′23″E	8215	
Building with curious pui under transverse gable roof with narrow carved consoles to the fascia	Workshop	possibly Middle ages 19th century (pui)		Gouden Pant 7	53°19′17″N 6°51′22″E	8216	
	Building						Upload Photo

== Garreweer ==
Description	Original function^{?}	Built	Architect	Location	Coordinates^{?}	No.^{?}	Image
Artificial dwelling hill	Archaeological site	Late Antiquity/Middle ages		Garreweersterpolder	53°18′41″N 6°48′39″E	45151	Upload Photo
Artificial dwelling hill	Archaeological site	Late Antiquity/Middle ages		Garreweersterpolder	53°18′40″N 6°48′53″E	45152	Upload Photo

== Jukwerd ==
Description	Original function^{?}	Built	Architect	Location	Coordinates^{?}	No.^{?}	Image
Artificial dwelling hill	Archaeological site	Late Antiquity		Jukwerderweg/Christophoripad	53°20′06″N 6°50′49″E	45150	Upload Photo
Artificial dwelling hill	Archaeological site	Late Antiquity/Middle ages		Jukwerd	53°20′03″N 6°50′49″E	45153	Upload Photo

== Laskwerd ==
Description	Original function^{?}	Built	Architect	Location	Coordinates^{?}	No.^{?}	Image
Artificial dwelling hill	Archaeological site	probably Middle ages		Laskwerd	53°17′37″N 6°50′38″E	45149	Upload Photo

== Marsum ==
Description	Original function^{?}	Built	Architect	Location	Coordinates^{?}	No.^{?}	Image
Mauritiuskerk	Church or part of church	c. 1306 restored 1949-1951		Marsumerweg 12	53°20′23″N 6°52′30″E	8252	
Artificial dwelling hill	Archaeological site	Late Antiquity/Middle ages		Marsum	53°20′29″N 6°52′24″E	45154	Upload Photo
Artificial dwelling hill	Archaeological site	Late Antiquity/Middle ages		Marsumerweg	53°20′22″N 6°52′32″E	45157	Upload Photo
Artificial dwelling hill	Archaeological site	Late Antiquity/Middle ages		Marsumerweg	53°20′24″N 6°52′33″E	45253	Upload Photo

== Opwierde ==
Description	Original function^{?}	Built	Architect	Location	Coordinates^{?}	No.^{?}	Image
Reformed church	Church or part of church	1225-1250 probably 1838 (partially rebuilt); 1910 (Flèche); 1964-1968 (restoration)		Opwierderweg 122	53°18′48″N 6°52′25″E	8253	
Artificial dwelling hill	Archaeological site	c. Late Antiquity		Opwierderweg	53°18′48″N 6°52′28″E	45254	Upload Photo

== Solwerd ==
Description	Original function^{?}	Built	Architect	Location	Coordinates^{?}	No.^{?}	Image
Reformed pastorage (De Weem)	Pastorage	1554		Pastorielaan 1	53°19′24″N 6°52′12″E	9254	
Large farm with house with framed entrance and a large, front-side-shortened cap	Farm			Pastorielaan 7	53°19′26″N 6°52′13″E	8255	
Reformed church with bellchair	Church or part of church	1783 (rebuilt)	possibly G. Bonsema	Pastorielaan 5	53°19′26″N 6°52′09″E	9256	
Artificial dwelling hill	Archaeological site	c. Late Antiquity		Pastorielaan	53°19′26″N 6°52′09″E	45255	Upload Photo
