= Post mill Rosmalen =

Windmill in the Netherlands

Coordinates: 51°42′36″N 5°21′41″E

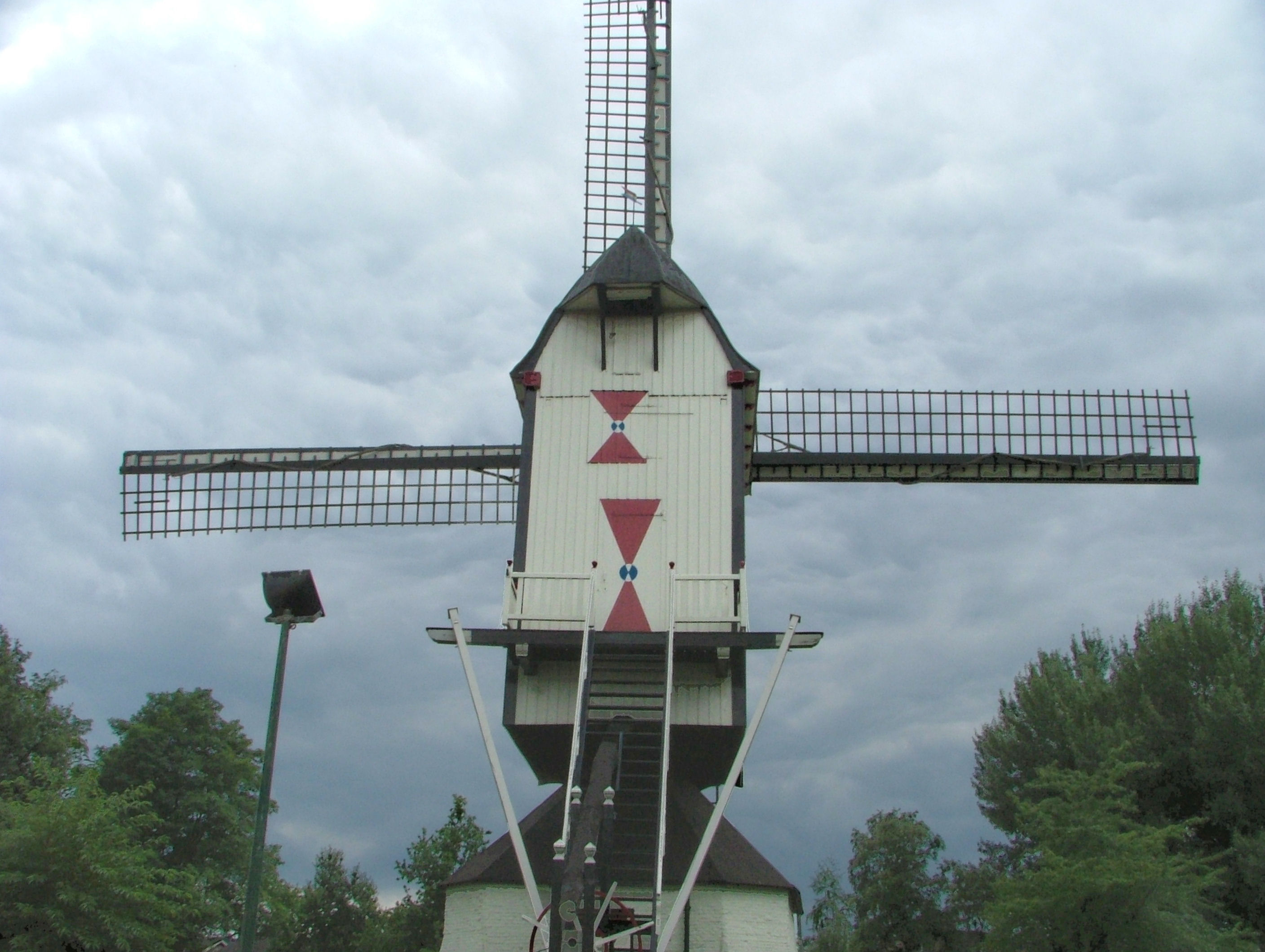
Post mill in Rosmalen.

Post mill Rosmalen (Dutch: Standerdmolen Rosmalen) is a historic post mill located in neighbourhood of Molenhoek in Rosmalen, Netherlands. Constructed in 1732, the mill stands on a natural slope, which is accentuated by the placement of old millstones.

Historically, Rosmalen had several mills, but this is the sole surviving one. Following damage sustained during the Second World War, plans were initially made to demolish the structure. However, its designation as a rijksmonument (national heritage site) ensured its preservation and eventual restoration.

Today, the mill is owned by the municipality of 's-Hertogenbosch, serving as a reminder of Rosmalen's milling heritage.
