= Smedestraat 33 (Haarlem) =

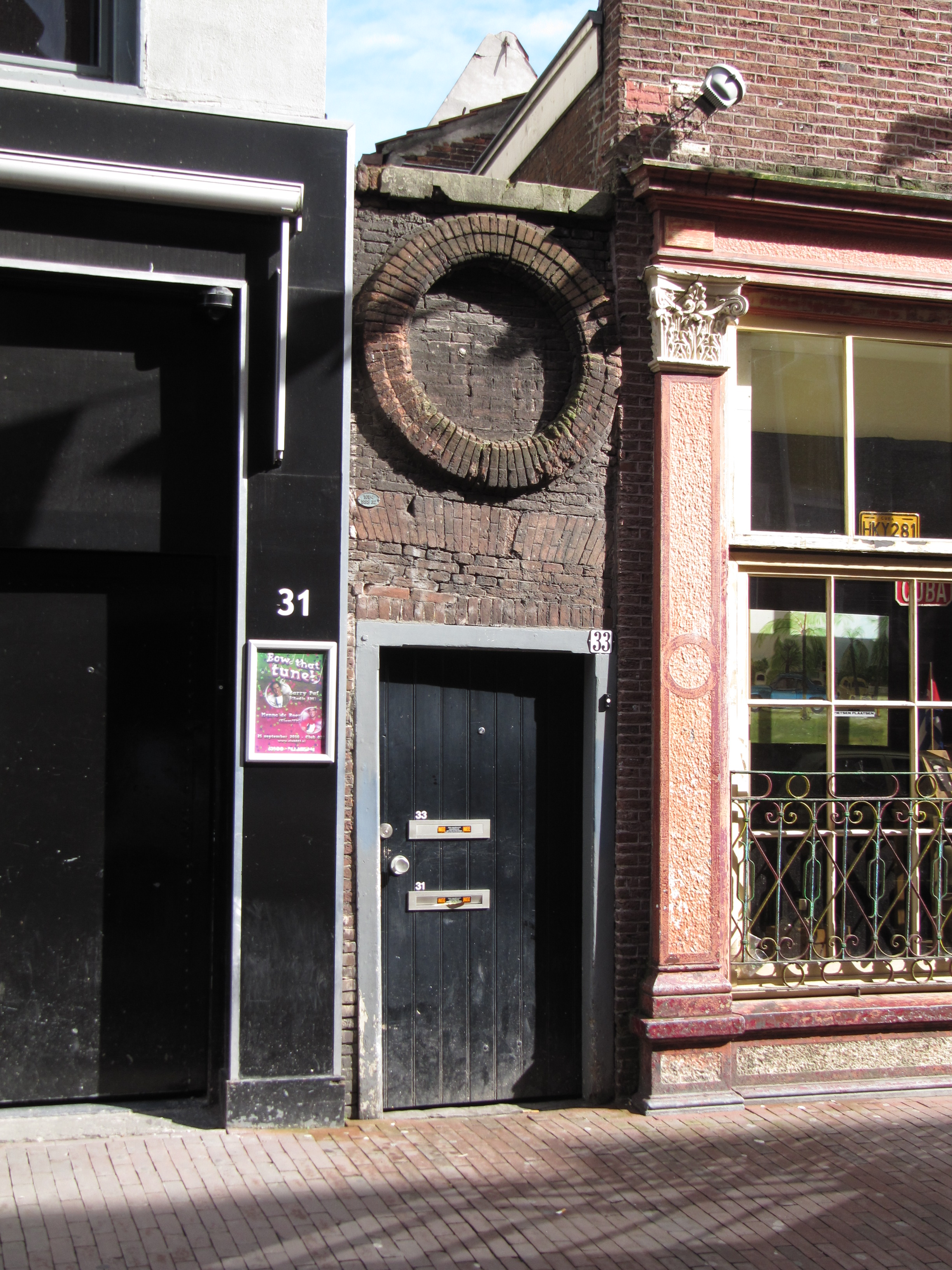
- Smedestraat 33, Haarlem, 2010. The door shows postal collection for house numbers 31 (nightclub on the left) and 33. The building on the right is number 35.

General information
- Type: Doorway
- Address: Smedestraat
- Town or city: Haarlem
- Country: Netherlands
- Coordinates: 52°22′56″N 4°38′11″E
- Completed: Latter half of 17th century
- Designations: National monument

Smedestraat 33 (Dutch: Smedestraat 33) is the address of a doorway in Haarlem. The brickwork of the doorway, including a round false window, is from the second half of the 17th century, and has been declared one of the national monuments of The Netherlands.

This brick doorway only recently acquired the lock on the door and was originally an open access gateway to an alley that separated two houses and joined up with the small public garden called the Wijngaardtuin. The lock has been added so it can be used as the front door to access the apartment located above the shop on the left and the house in the rear of number 35 on the right. In the Haarlem shopping district, most former front doors of homes have been replaced by shop fronts extending over the entire property line on the shopping street side. For homes without a rear or side alleyway, the upper apartments have become inaccessible and are used as warehouses.

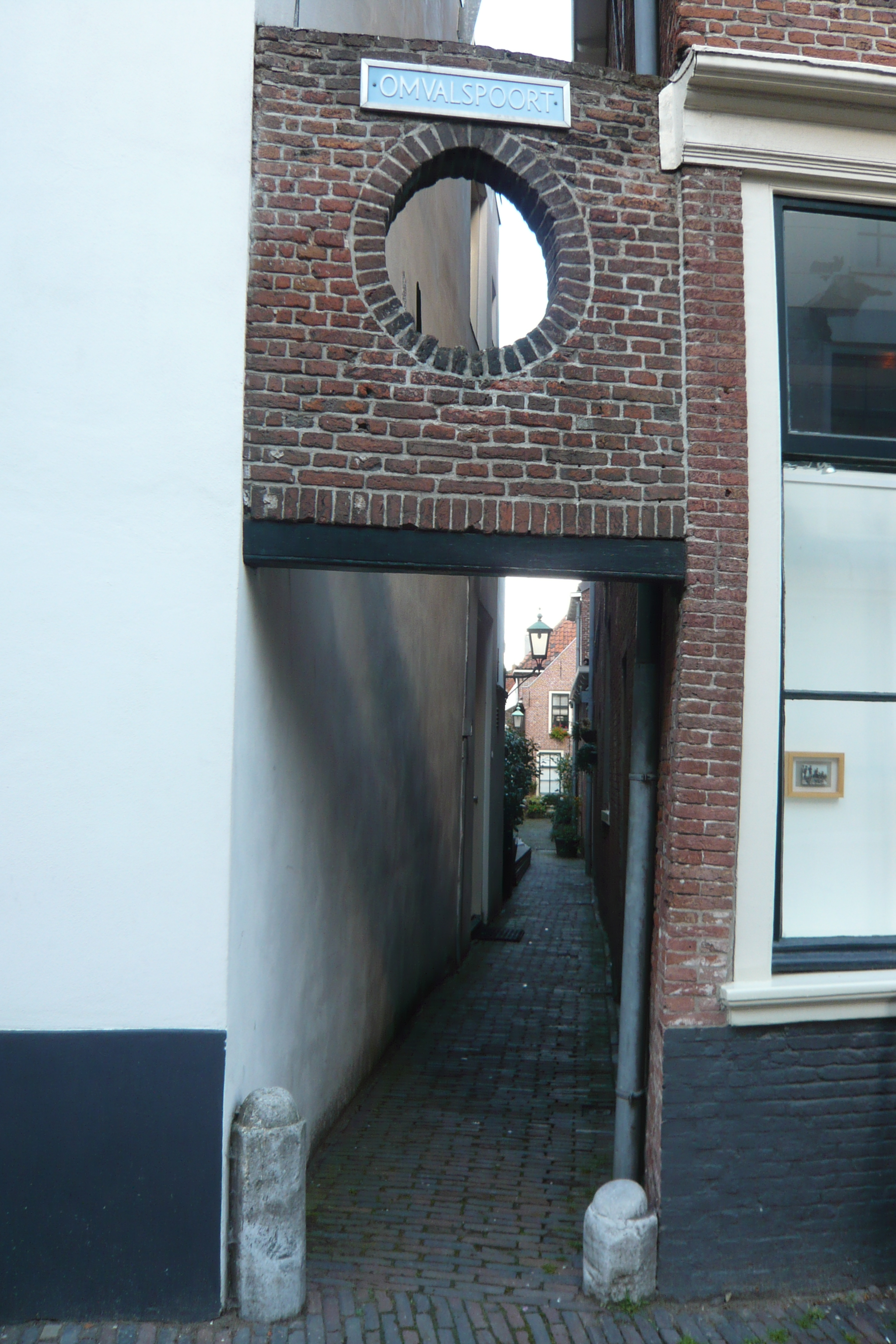
The Omvalspoort is a similar gateway in Haarlem that has not been closed with a door

In larger Dutch cities, where many former alleyways have been absorbed into shopfronts, this has led to whole sections of town with very few residents, as there is no room left for access to the upper apartments except from within the shops themselves. Seen as a possible fire hazard and prone to decay, efforts have been made in recent years to "unlock" these inaccessible spaces and make them suitable for student or other rental housing. The city of Haarlem hopes to avoid such situations by formally protecting all historical alleyways and not allowing them to be "added" to shop frontage. In Vermeer's Little Street, two such 17th century alleyways can be seen side by side; neither has such interesting brickwork, however.
