= Elke Slagt-Tichelman =

Dutch politician (born 1977)

Member of the House of Representatives
- In office 9 December 2023 – 11 November 2025

Personal details
- Born: 18 February 1977 (age 49) Zevenaar, Netherlands
- Party: GroenLinks

Elke Slagt-Tichelman (born 18 February 1977) is a Dutch politician representing GroenLinks who was elected to the House of Representatives in the 2023 Dutch general election. Her focus was on long-term healthcare, preventive care, and medical ethics.

She wrote a bill that would allow doctors to prescribe medication abortion to women outside of the Netherlands. The bill's intention was to offer the possibility to citizens of the European Union for whom abortion access is restricted. A majority of the House criticized the proposal in a House debate. The House adopted a motion by Slagt-Tichelman and Harmen Krul (CDA) urging the government to institute a smoking ban at sports fields, playgrounds, outdoor swimming pools, recreational attractions, and childcare facilities.

She did not run for re-election in 2025, and her term ended on 11 November 2025.

== House committee assignments ==
- Committee for Health, Welfare and Sport

== Electoral history ==
Electoral history of Elke Slagt-Tichelman
Year	Body	Party	Pos.	Votes	Result		Ref.
Year	Body	Party	Pos.	Votes	Party seats	Individual	Ref.
2023	House of Representatives	GroenLinks–PvdA	19	10,333	25 / 150	Won	
2026	Assen Municipal Council	GroenLinks–PvdA	35 (Note: Slagt-Tichelman participated as lijstduwer.)	37	7 / 35	Lost	

== See also ==
- List of members of the House of Representatives of the Netherlands, 2023–2025
