= Lange Jaap =

Lange Jaap Lighthouse Kijkduin
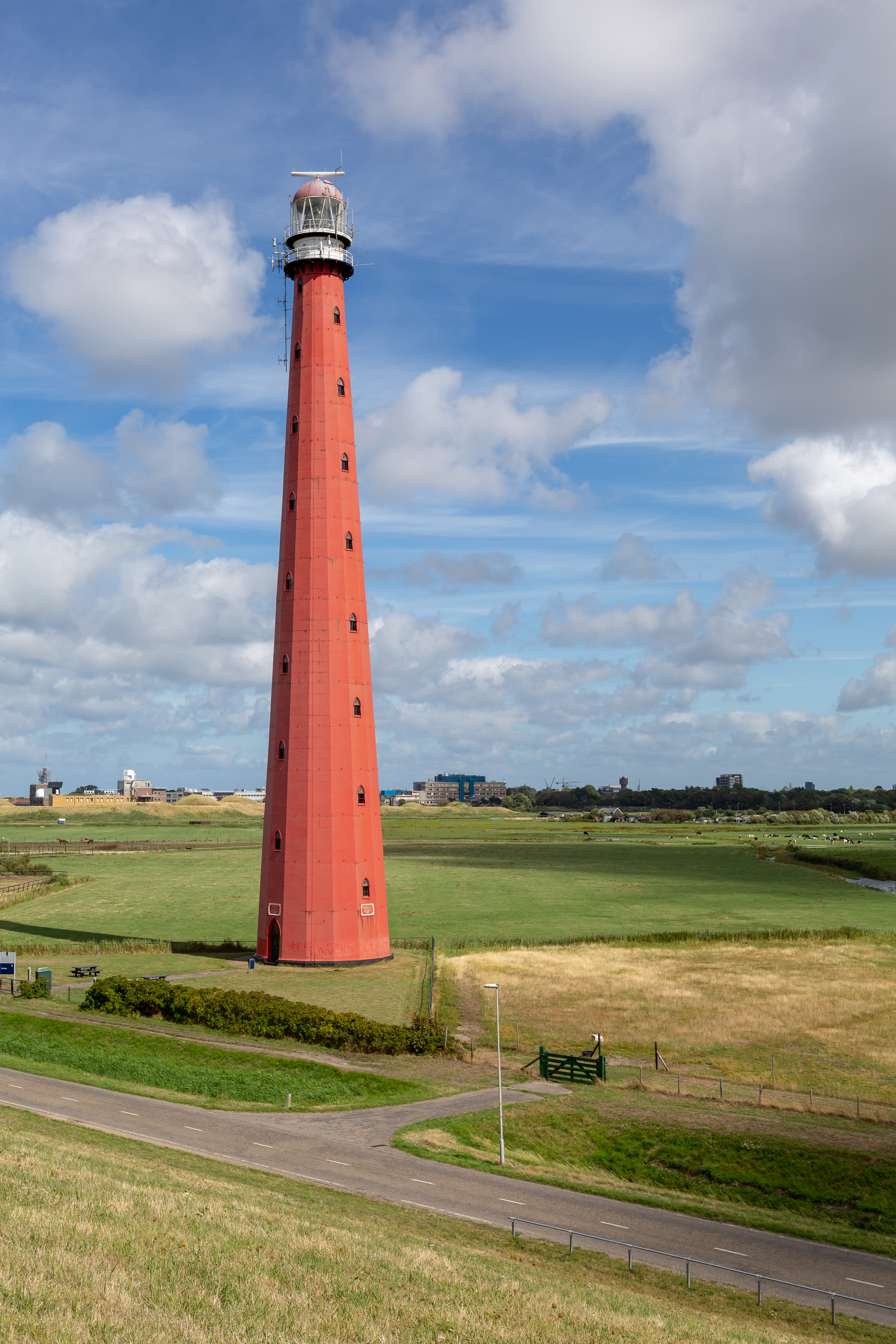
- Lange Jaap
- Location: Huisduinen; Netherlands
- Coordinates: 52°57′19.74″N 4°43′35.06″E

Tower
- Constructed: 1822 (first)
- Construction: cast iron tower
- Height: 63.45 metres (208.2 ft)
- Shape: 16-sided tapered prism with gallery, lantern and rotating antenna
- Markings: red tower and dome, white lantern
- Heritage: Rijksmonument

Light
- First lit: 1878 (current)
- Focal height: 57 metres (187 ft)
- Lens: 1st order Fresnel lens
- Intensity: 5,200,000 cd
- Range: 30 nautical miles (56 km; 35 mi)
- Characteristic: Fl (4) W 20s.
- Netherlands no.: NL-1494

Lange Jaap ("Tall Jake"), also known as Kijkduin Light or Den Helder Light, is an active lighthouse near Fort Kijkduin in Huisduinen, Netherlands. At a height of 63.5 metres (208.2 ft) it is one of the tallest "traditional lighthouses" in the world. For almost a century, from 1878 to 1974, it was the tallest lighthouse in the Netherlands, until the construction of the Maasvlakte Light. According to The Lighthouse Directory it is the tallest non-skeletal cast-iron lighthouse in the world.

The site used to be open and accessible to visitors. Due to safety concerns, the tower itself has been closed to the public since 1998.

== History ==
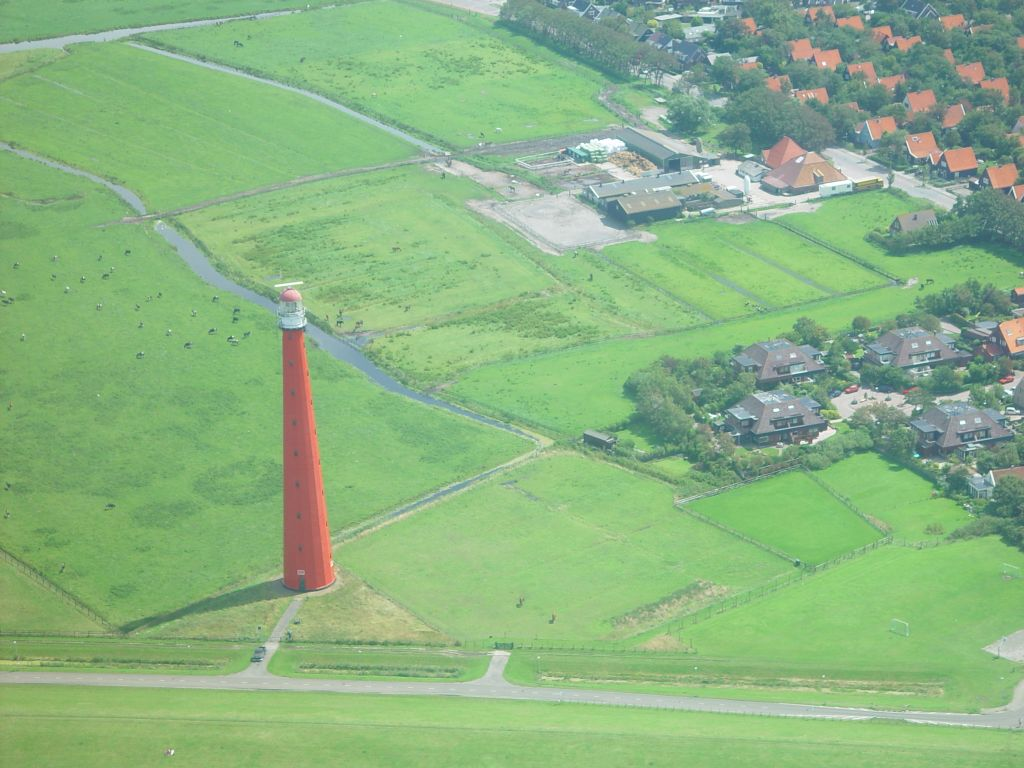
Aerial view of Lange Jaap, 2005

The first aid to navigation at the site was a simple coal-fire light from 1814, at Fort Kijkduin, a few hundred meters north of the current tower. In 1822 the construction of the first tower was completed and it was first lit on 29 October 1822. The tower was a 22-metre (72 ft)-tall, six-storey brick tower. The light consisted of 26 Argand lamps with parabolic reflectors, visible at a distance of up to 6 nautical miles (11 km; 6.9 mi). Cracks in the building foundation were repaired twice, in 1826 and 1827. In 1853 the light was replaced by an Argand lamp lens system with fixed Fresnel lens.

The construction of the second and current lighthouse started in 1877 and its first illumination was on 1 April 1878. The first lens system was a stationary lens with Argand lamps from the old tower. In 1903 this was replaced with a Barbier and F.B. rotational system, with Mercury bearings. It used incandescent kerosene and had an intensity of 1,200,000 cd. Its characteristic was 2 flashes every 10s and was visible for "20 English miles".

In 1912 an improved pharoline incandescent light was installed. The light was electrified in 1924 and a Brandaris 80V 50A lamp was fitted. In 1940, during World War II, this light system was destroyed. During the war the lighthouse was painted in camouflage-colours. An emergency light was installed in 1945, with an intensity of 62,000 cd. On 2 September 1949, the current 920mm 1st order Fresnel lens was installed.

In 1988 the site was listed as a Rijksmonument. The cupola and lantern pane were replaced in 1992; the old shell is displayed outdoors in the royal dockyard of Willemsoord in Den Helder. In 1998 the lighthouse was closed to the public due to cracks on the cast-iron floors. Although it was refurbished in 1999 and a new coat of paint was applied, as of 2002 it is unlikely that the tower will be reopened, especially due to more stringent safety regulations introduced after the Volendam café disaster and the formation of the Dutch Safety Board.

In September 2021, according to the latest safety inspection, major cracks in the cast iron caused the site to be blocked for visitors. Due to the possibility of the construction collapsing, a 70-meter range around the lighthouse was completely fenced off. The area was reopened later, but it is cordoned off when storm winds are expected. Whether and how the construction can be braced and reinforced is now being considered.

== Construction ==
The 17-storey 264-step tower was designed by Quirinus Harder and prefabricated by Penn & Bauduin in Dordrecht. It was constructed from 1,088 iron plates and 21,446 nuts and bolts.

== In popular culture ==
Lange Jaap is the subject of the song "Onze Lange Jaap" by Jan Helder.

== See also ==
- List of tallest lighthouses in the world
- List of lighthouses in the Netherlands
- List of Rijksmonuments
