= Baden Powelllaan 12, Rotterdam =

18th-century historic house in Rotterdam, Netherlands

Baden Powelllaan 12
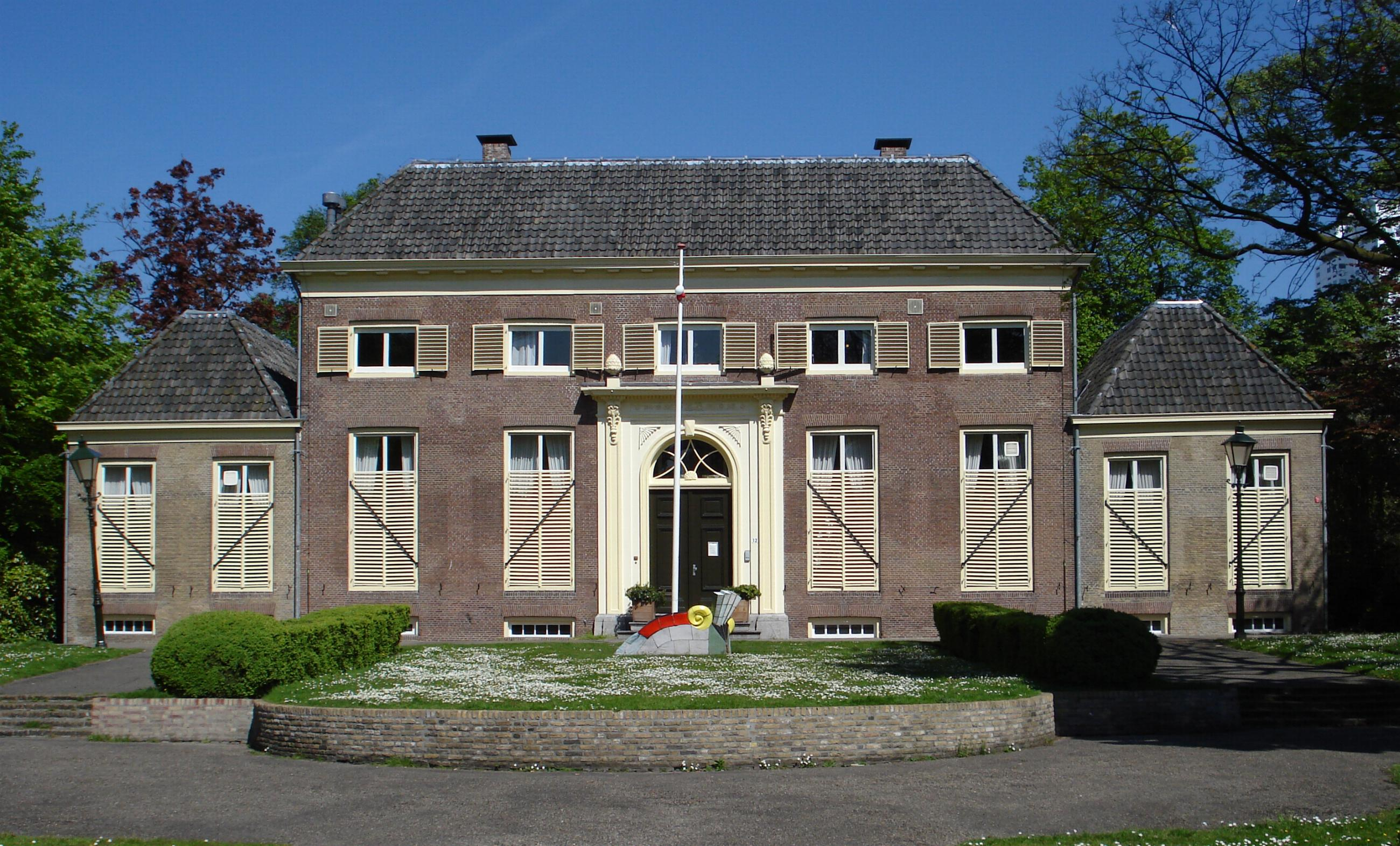
- Rotterdam badenpowelllaan12

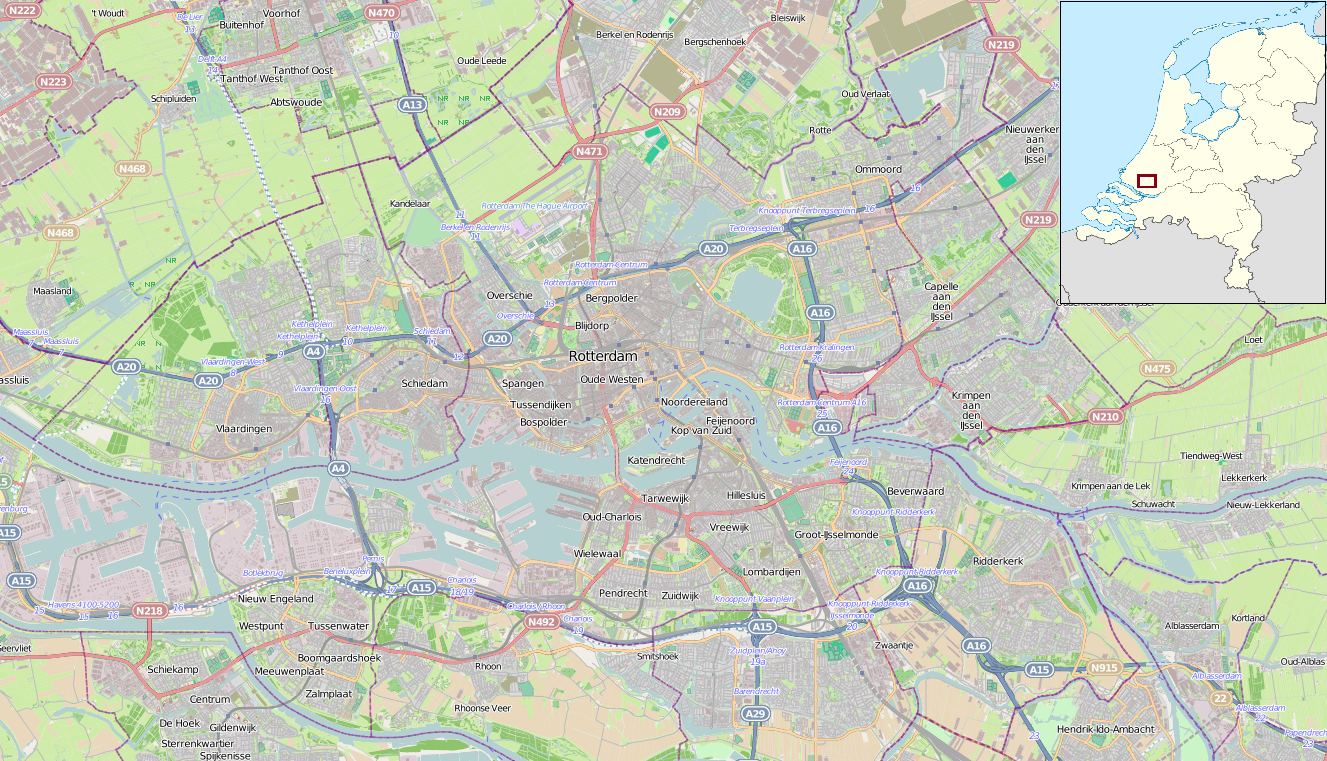
- Location in Rotterdam

General information
- Type: Heerenhuis
- Location: Baden Powelllaan 12, Het Park, Rotterdam, Netherlands
- Coordinates: 51°54′24.5″N 4°28′6.5″E
- Construction started: c. 1760

Baden Powelllaan 12 is an old house (Heerenhuis) in Het Park, Rotterdam, built circa 1760. Found near the Euromast it was the main building of the De Heuvel estate. From 1875 this villa forms part of the Park. The mansion reflects the late 18th century Dutch grandeur It is classified as a Rijksmonument (number: 32733).

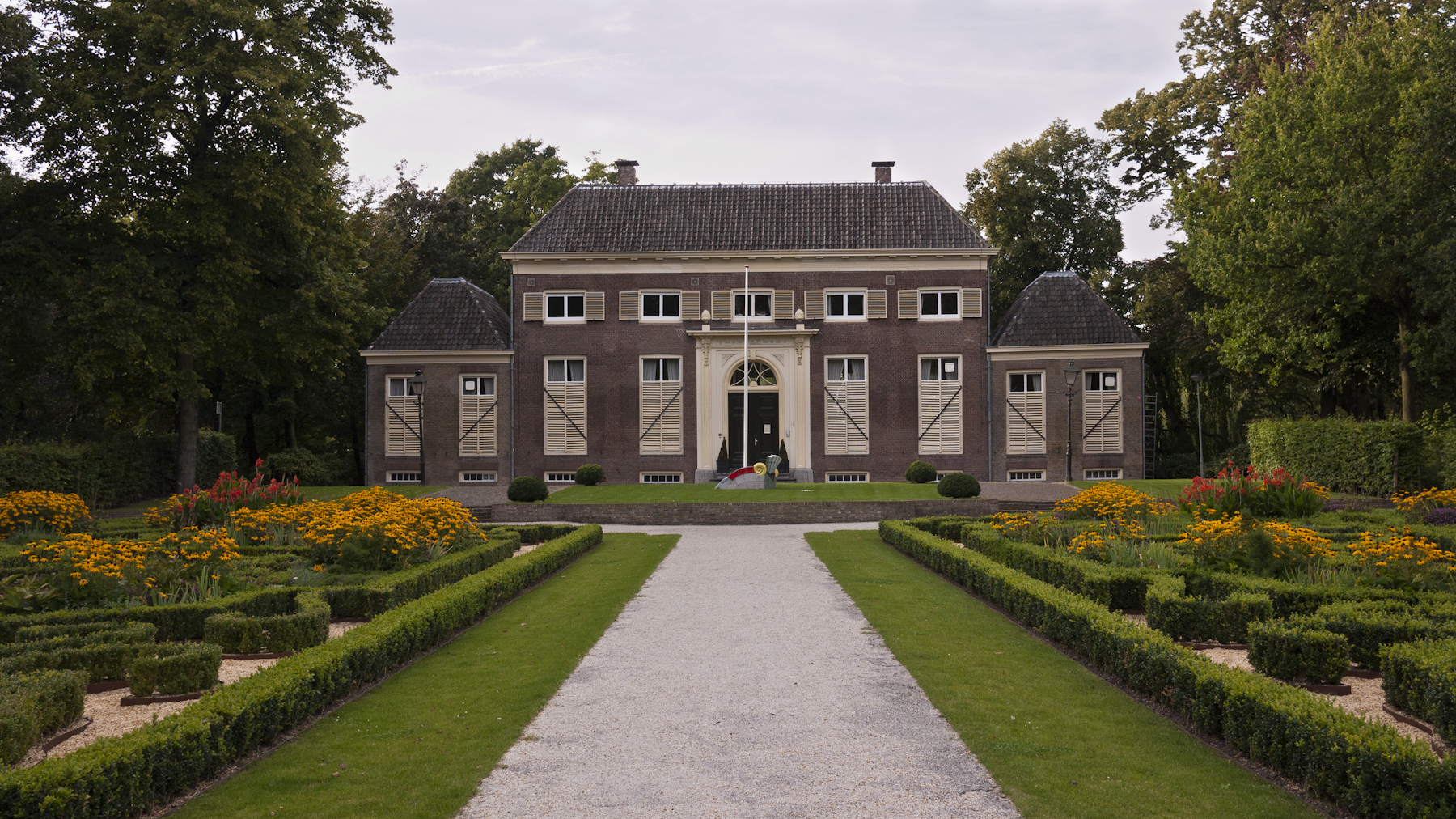
Baden Powelllaan 12
