= Assumburg =

Monumental windmill, Netherlands

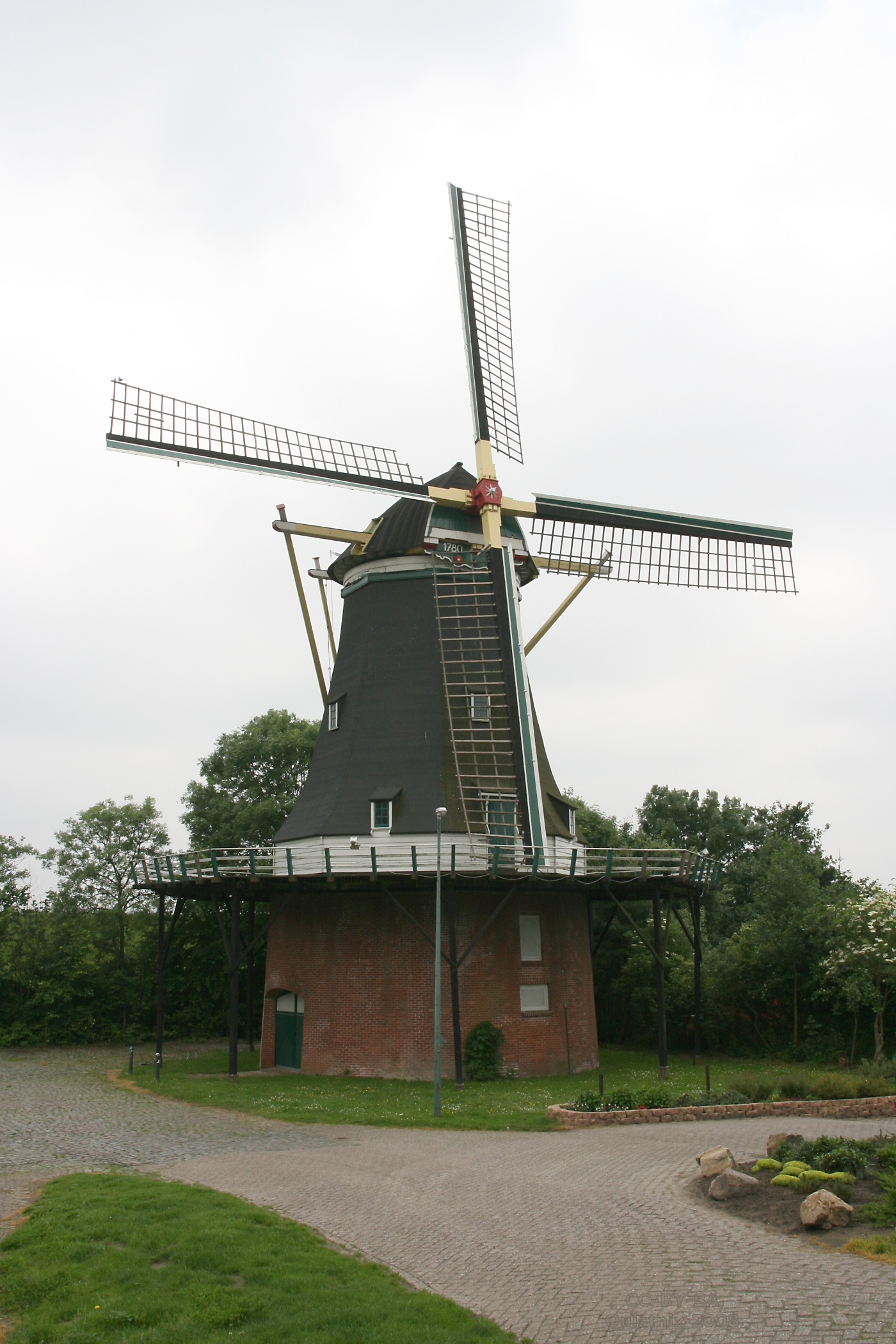
- Assumburg in 2008

General information
- Status: Rijksmonument (30611)
- Type: Windmill
- Address: Veerweg 1; 4681 RH, Nieuw-Vossemeer, Steenbergen
- Town or city: Steenbergen
- Country: Netherlands
- Coordinates: 51.579444°N 4.212222°E
- Completed: 1780, 1897
- Designations: Oil mill (1780-1897); Gristmill (1897-)

References
- Database of Mills; Database of Mills; De Hollandsche Molen

The Assumburg, also known as Het Huis Assenburg (English: The House Assenburg), is a windmill located on the Veerweg 1 in Nieuw-Vossemeer, Steenbergen, in the province of North Brabant, Netherlands. Built in 1780 in The Zaan district, the windmill functioned as oil mill, until it was moved to its current location in 1897, when it became a gristmill. The mill was built as a tower mill with a bottom support of 5.20 meters high, and its sails have a span of 22.20 meters. The mill is a national monument (nr 30611) since 15 May 1973.

== Gallery of images ==
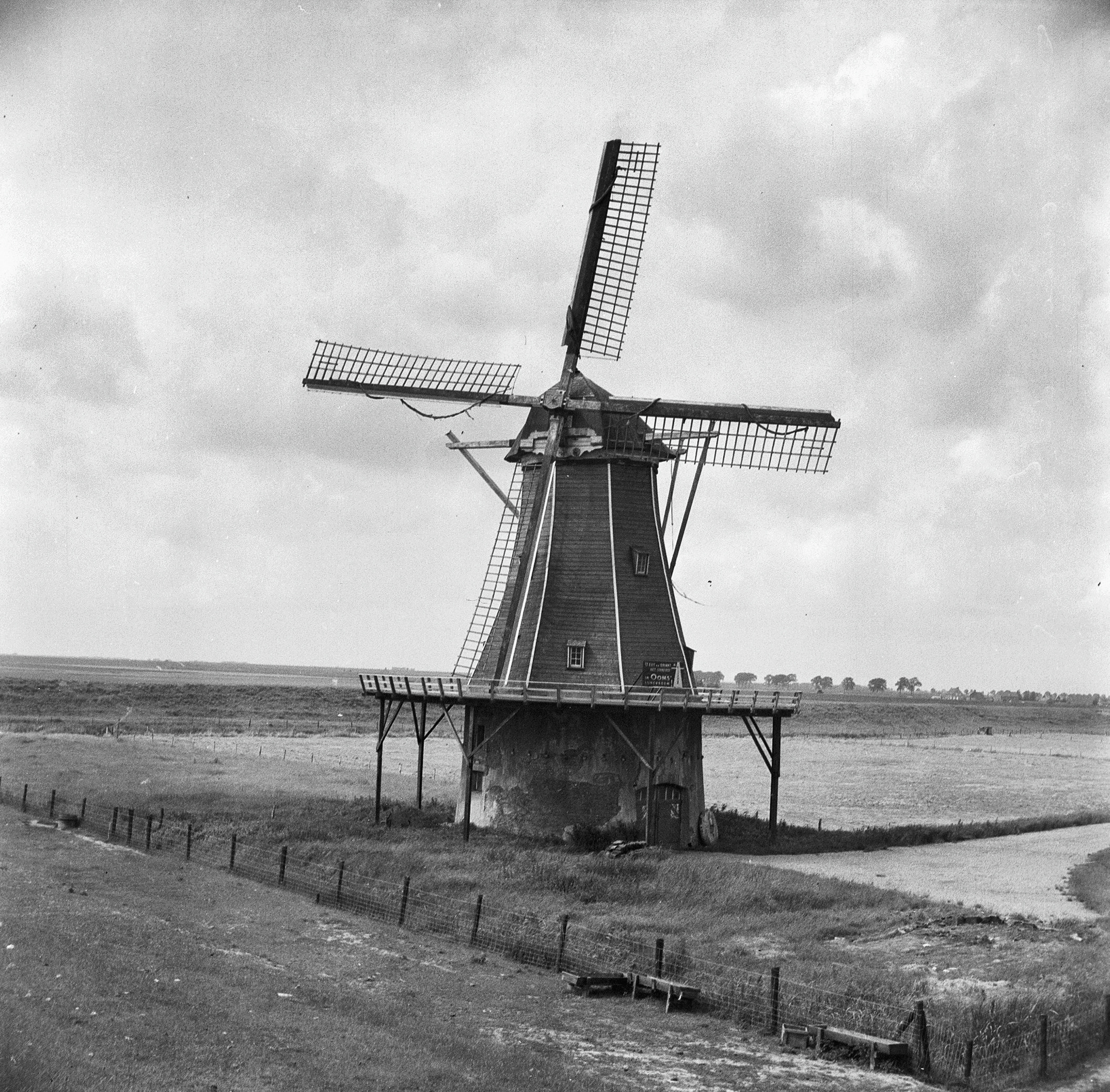
Assenburg in 1962

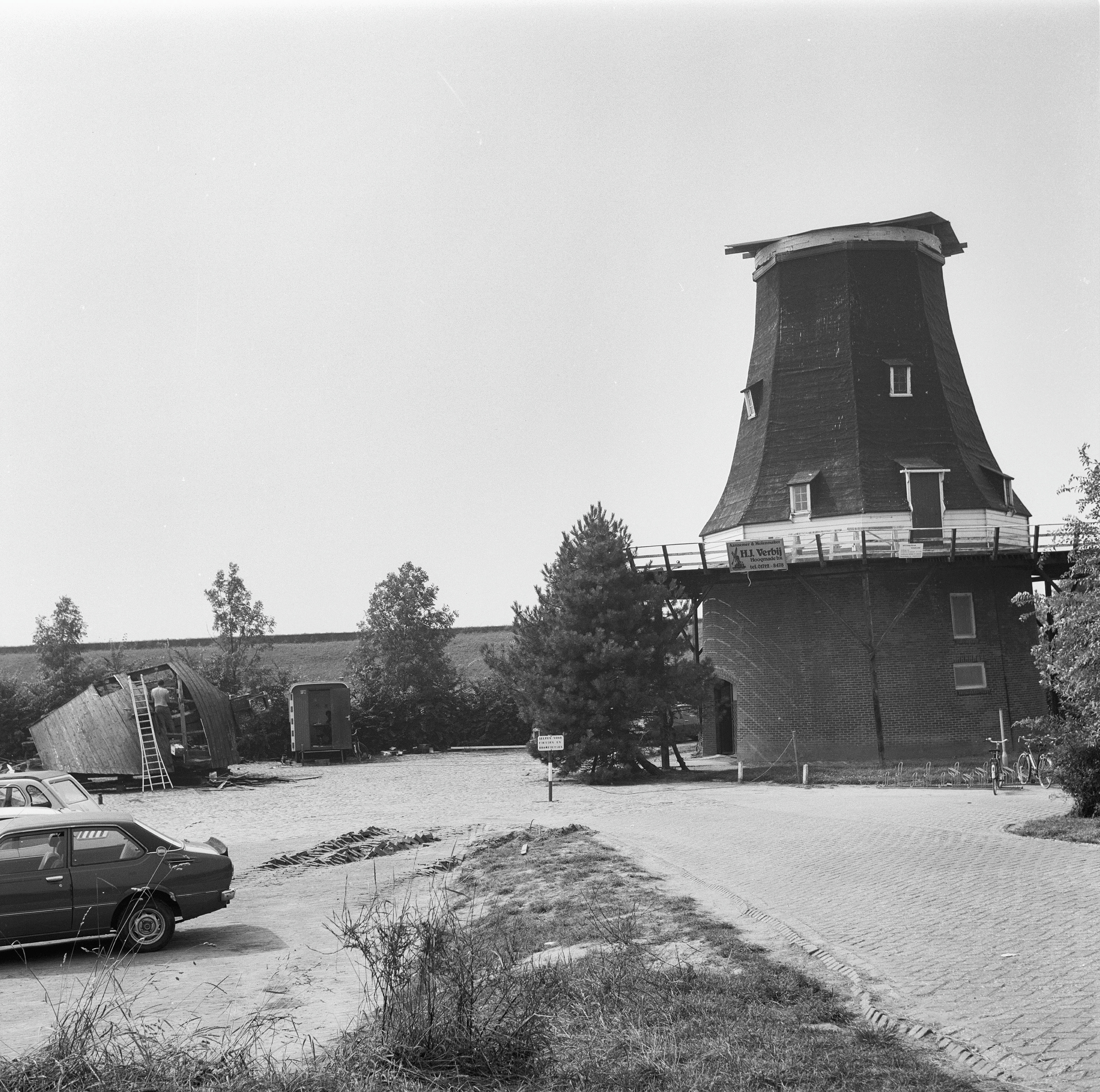
Mill without its top and sails

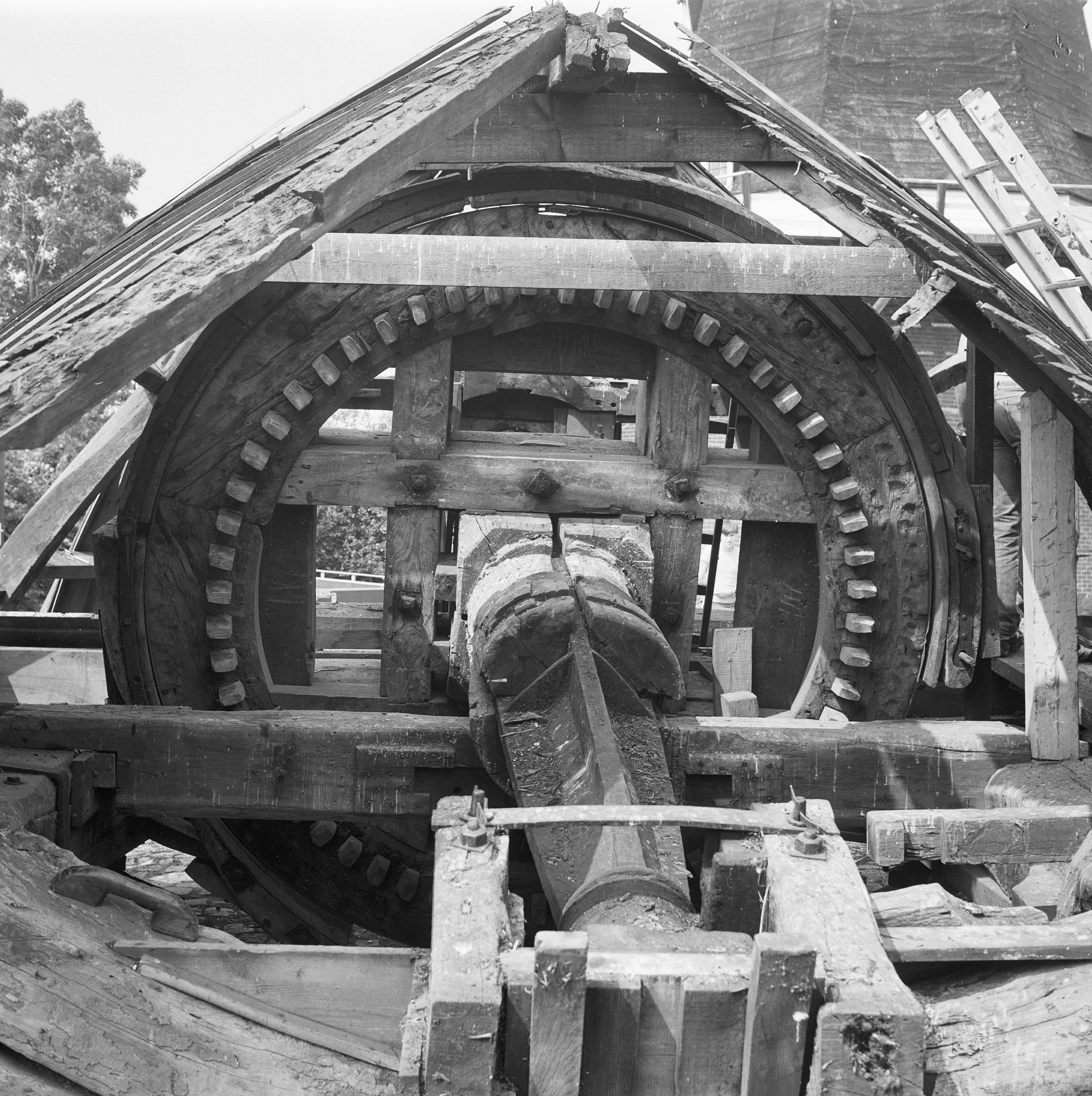
Top section, removed during restoration
