= De Adriaan, Veldhoven =

Dutch gristmill, built 1906

De Adriaan
- The Adriaan
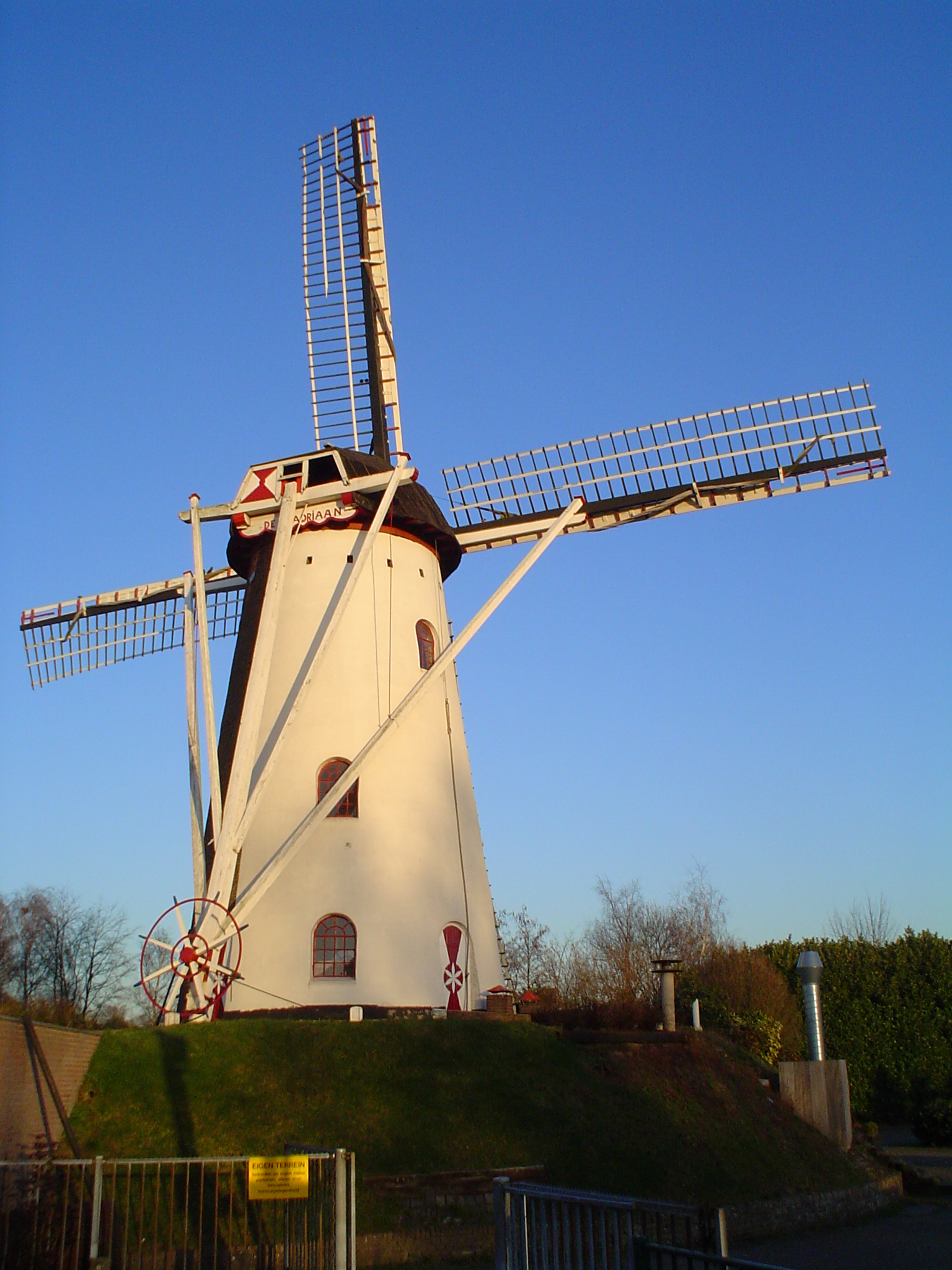
- De Adriaan in 2008
- Interactive map of the De Adriaan area

General information
- Status: Rijksmonument (37040)
- Type: Windmill
- Location: Windmolen 17; 5503 XV, Veldhoven, Veldhoven, Netherlands,
- Coordinates: 51.411944°N 5.41°E
- Completed: 1906
- Designations: Gristmill, out of use Cafeteria

References
- Database of Mills; De Hollandsche Molen

De Adriaan (English: The Adriaan) is a windmill located on the Windmolen 17 in Meerveldhoven, a neighbourhood of Veldhoven, North Brabant, Netherlands. Built in 1906 on an artificial hill, the windmill functioned a gristmill. The mill was built as a tower mill and its sails have a span of 25.5 meters. The mill is a national monument (nr 37040) since 1 October 1969.

== History ==
Built in 1906, De Adriaan was originally used as a gristmill. It was built in order of the family Van Grinsven from Beek en Donk. Since 1935 the mill is property of the family De Jongh. The mill was in regular use until the 1980s when the family De Jong took another windmill, Sint Jan, in use, located in Hoogeind in Veldhoven. The lower section of the mill are now used as a cafeteria. The mill is still in ready order. In later days houses were built around the mill, decreasing its visibility.

== Gallery of images ==
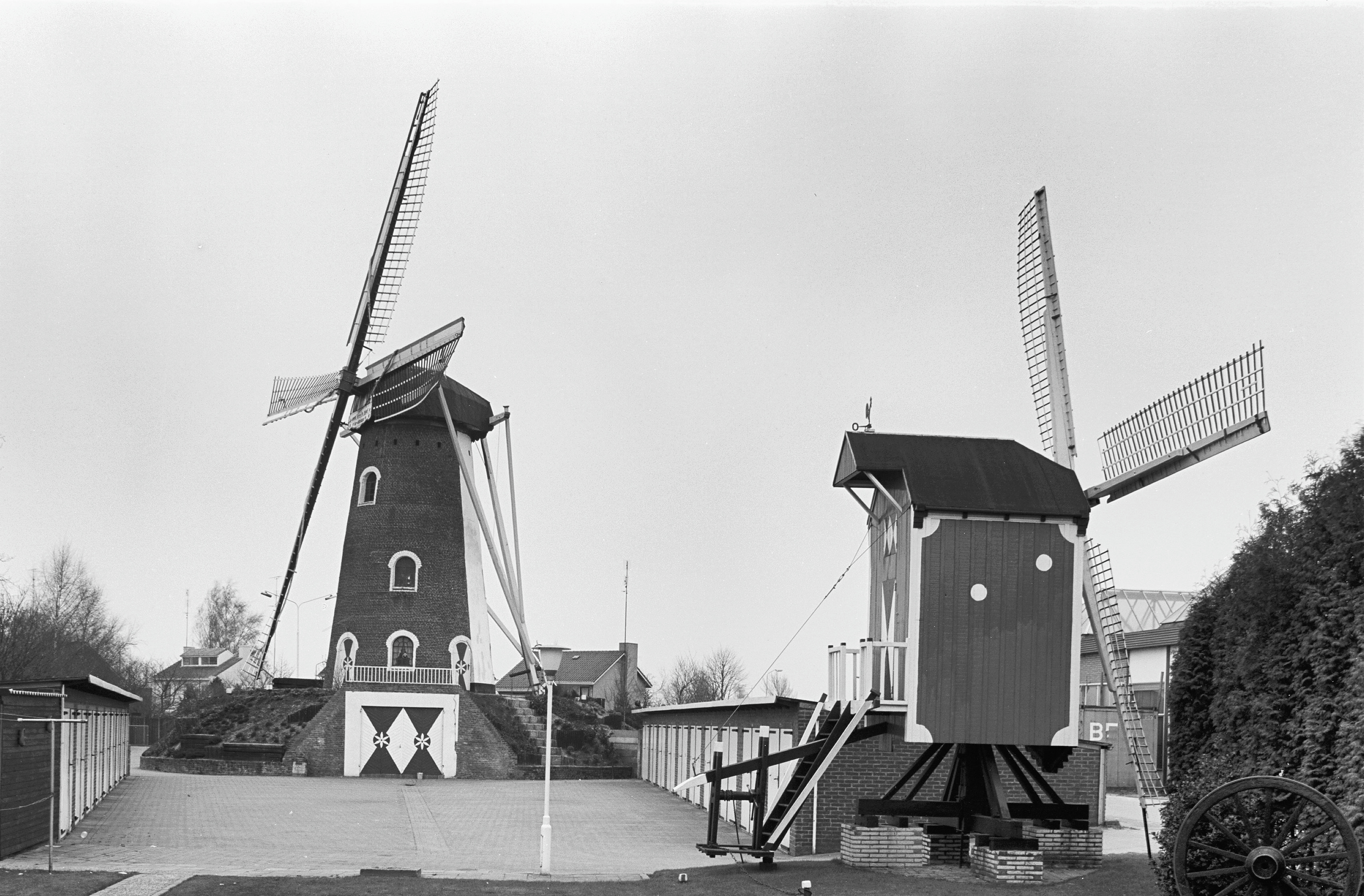
Overview of the mill

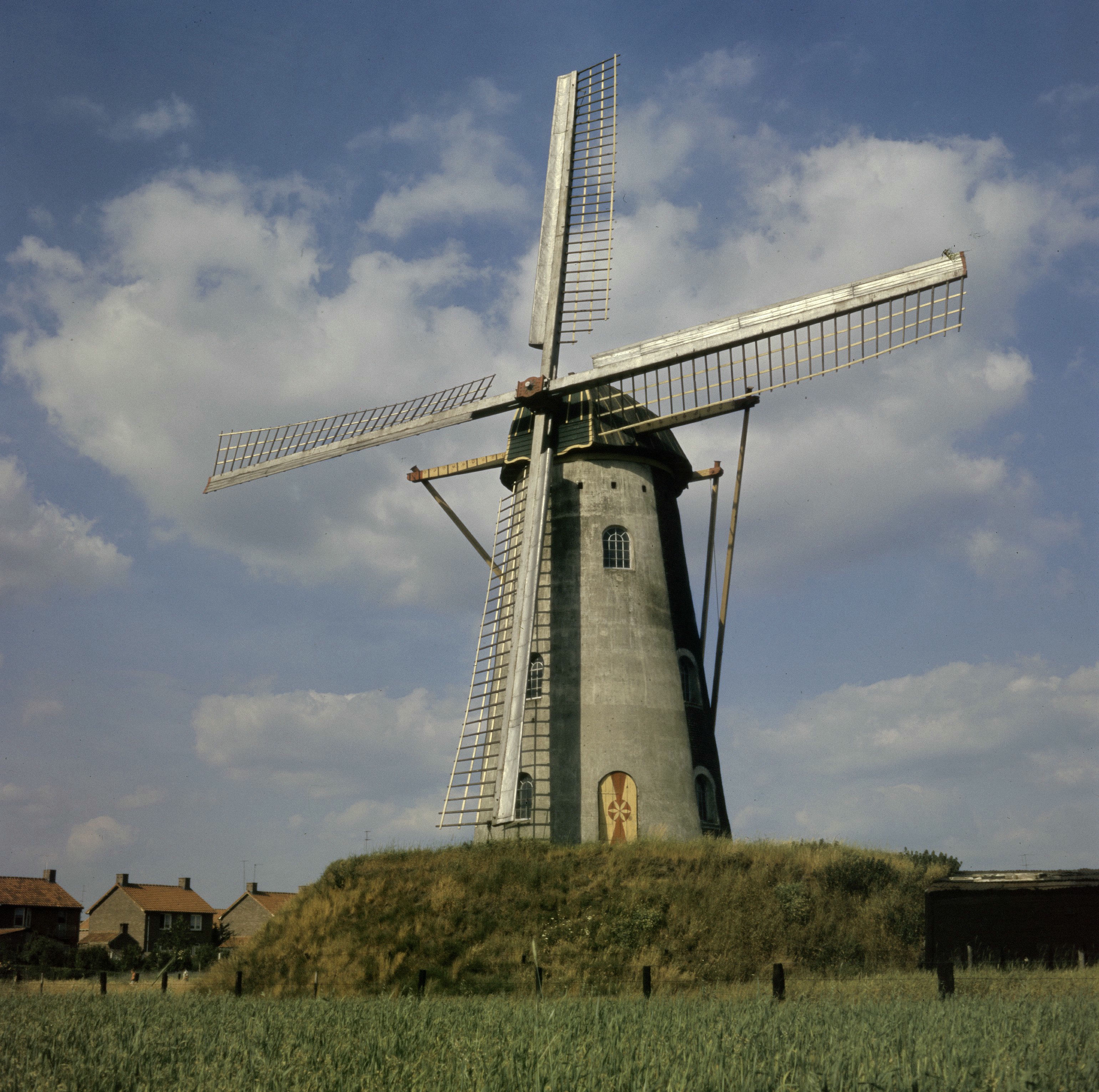
The mill is built on an artificial hill

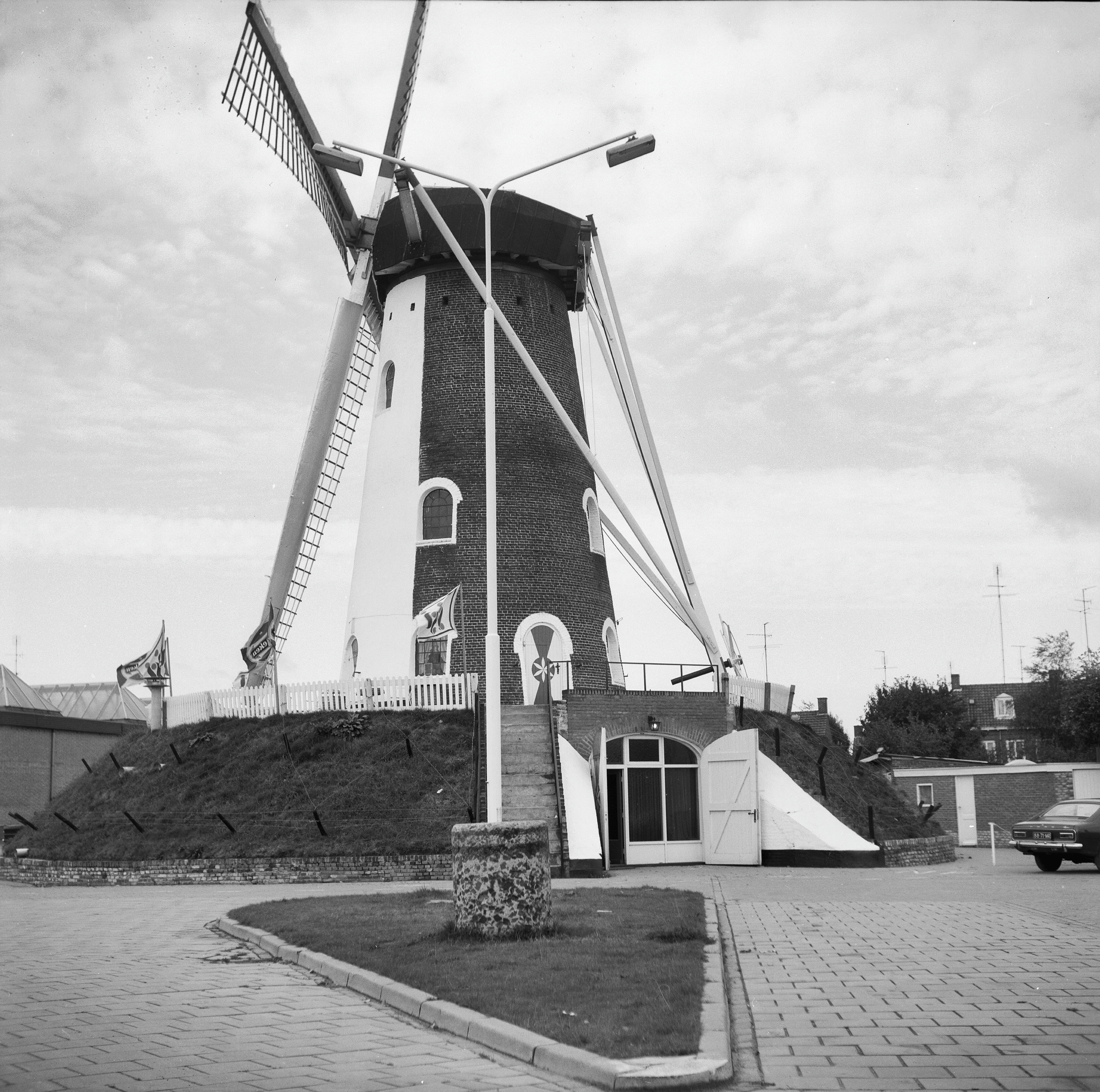
Mill seen from the west

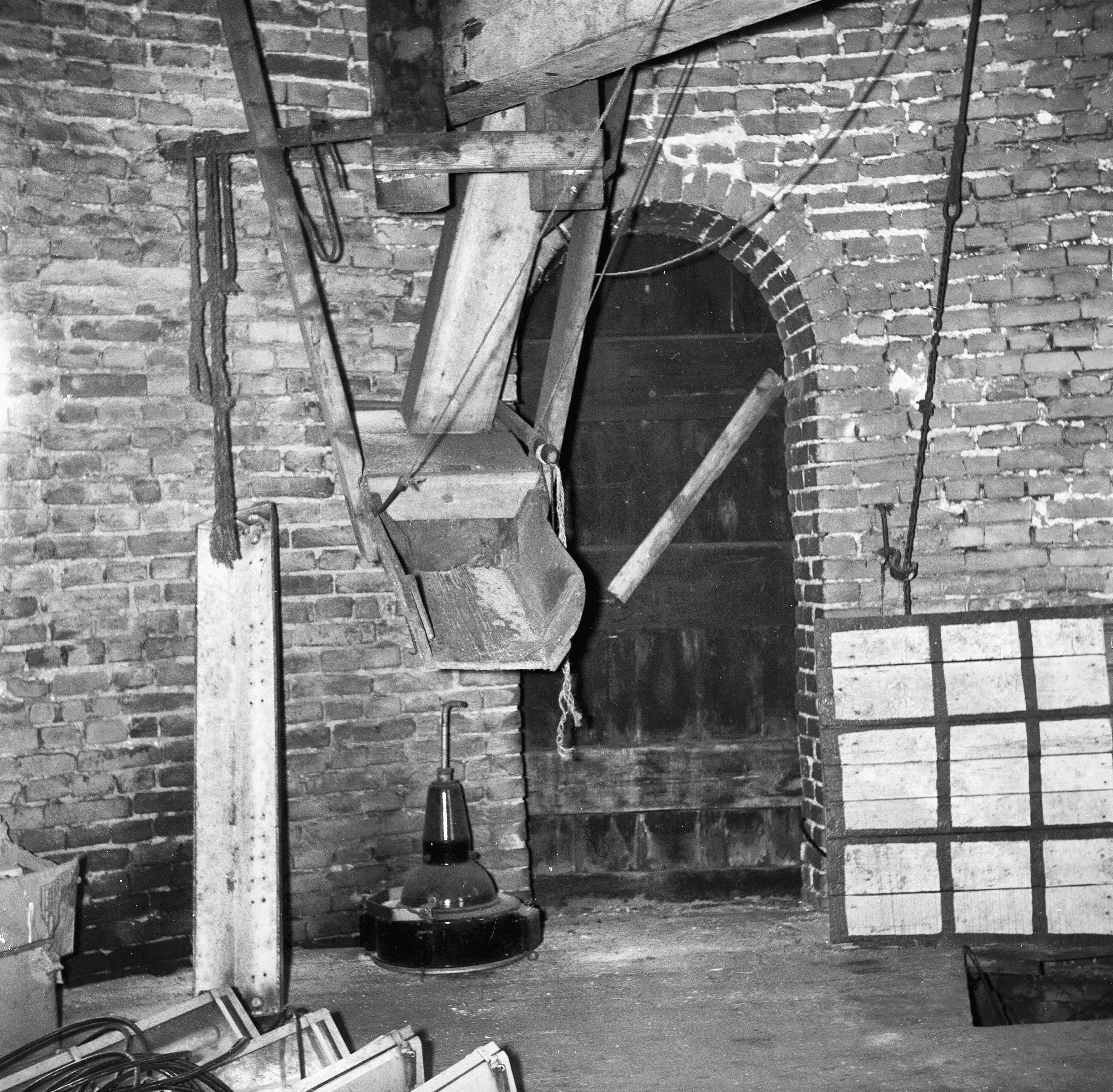
Ground floor

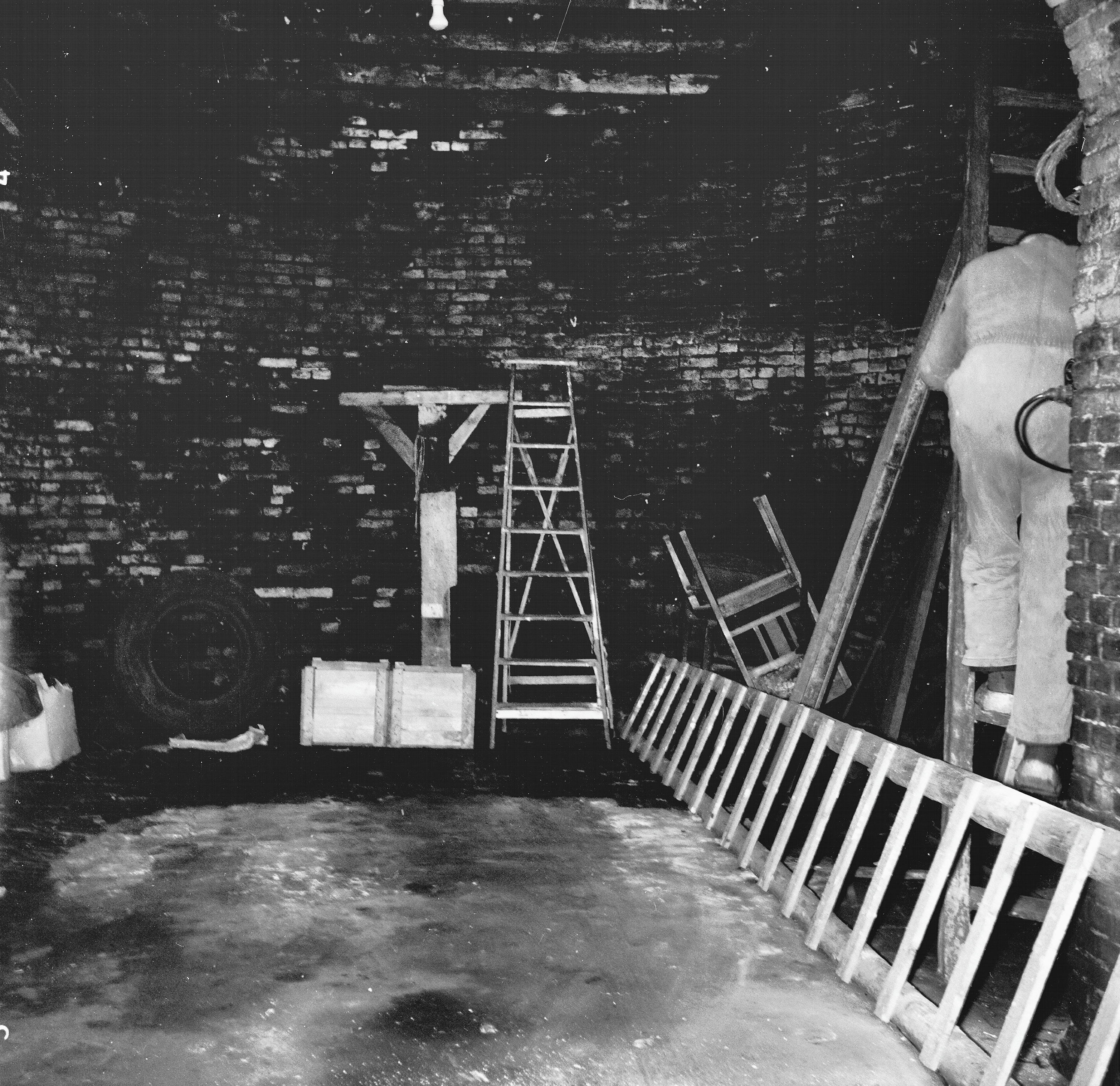
Ground floor

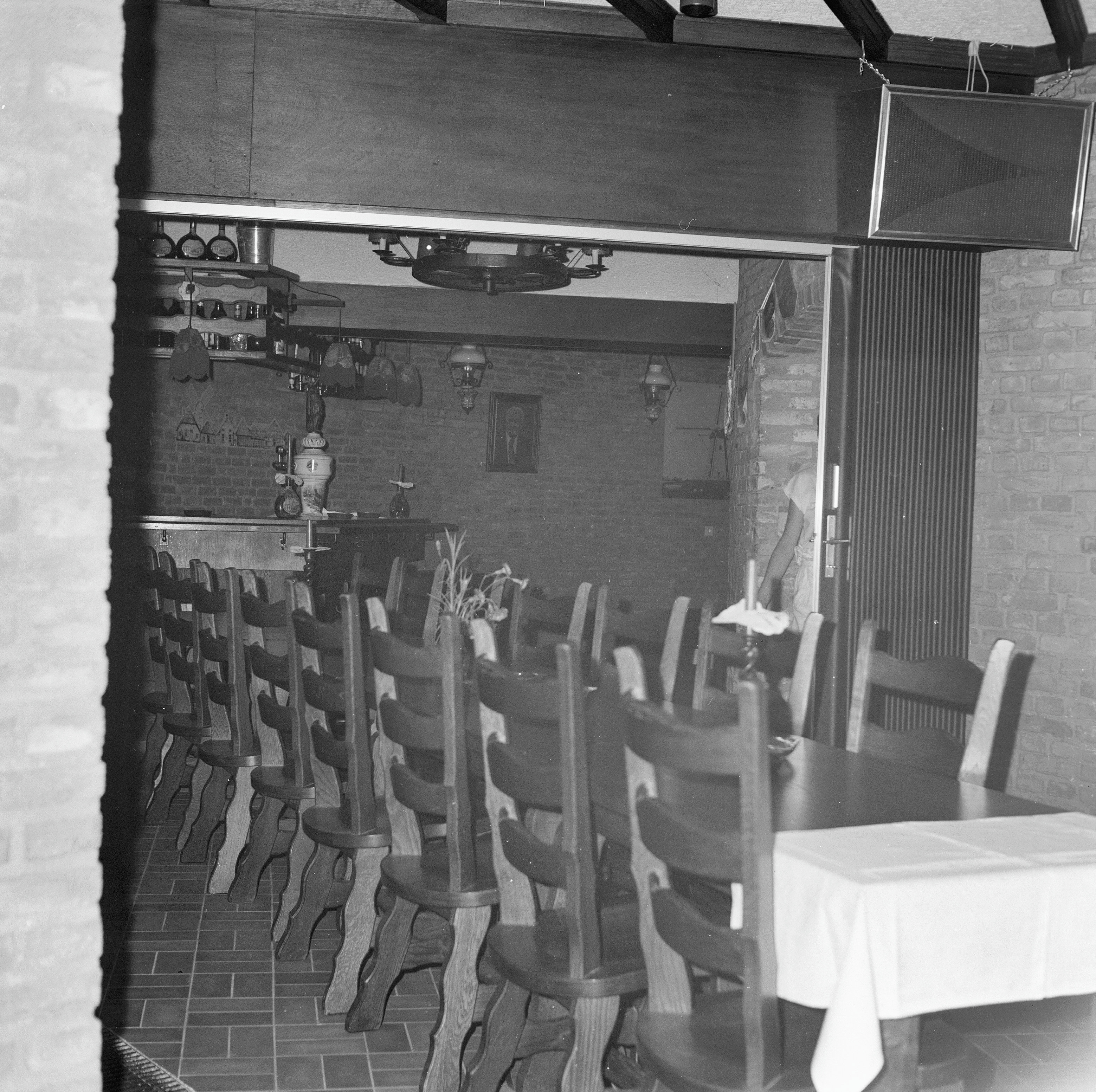
Cafeteria

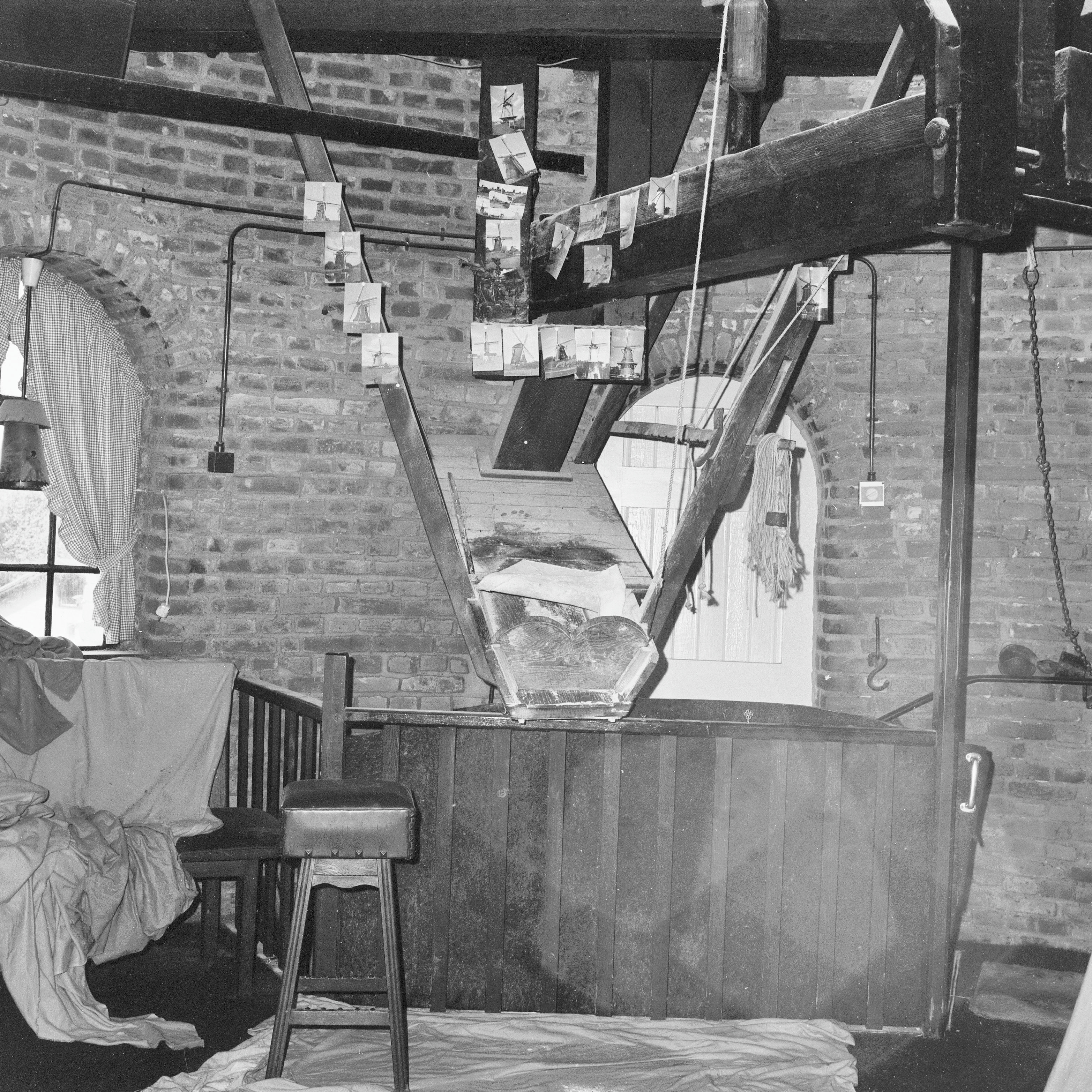
Attic

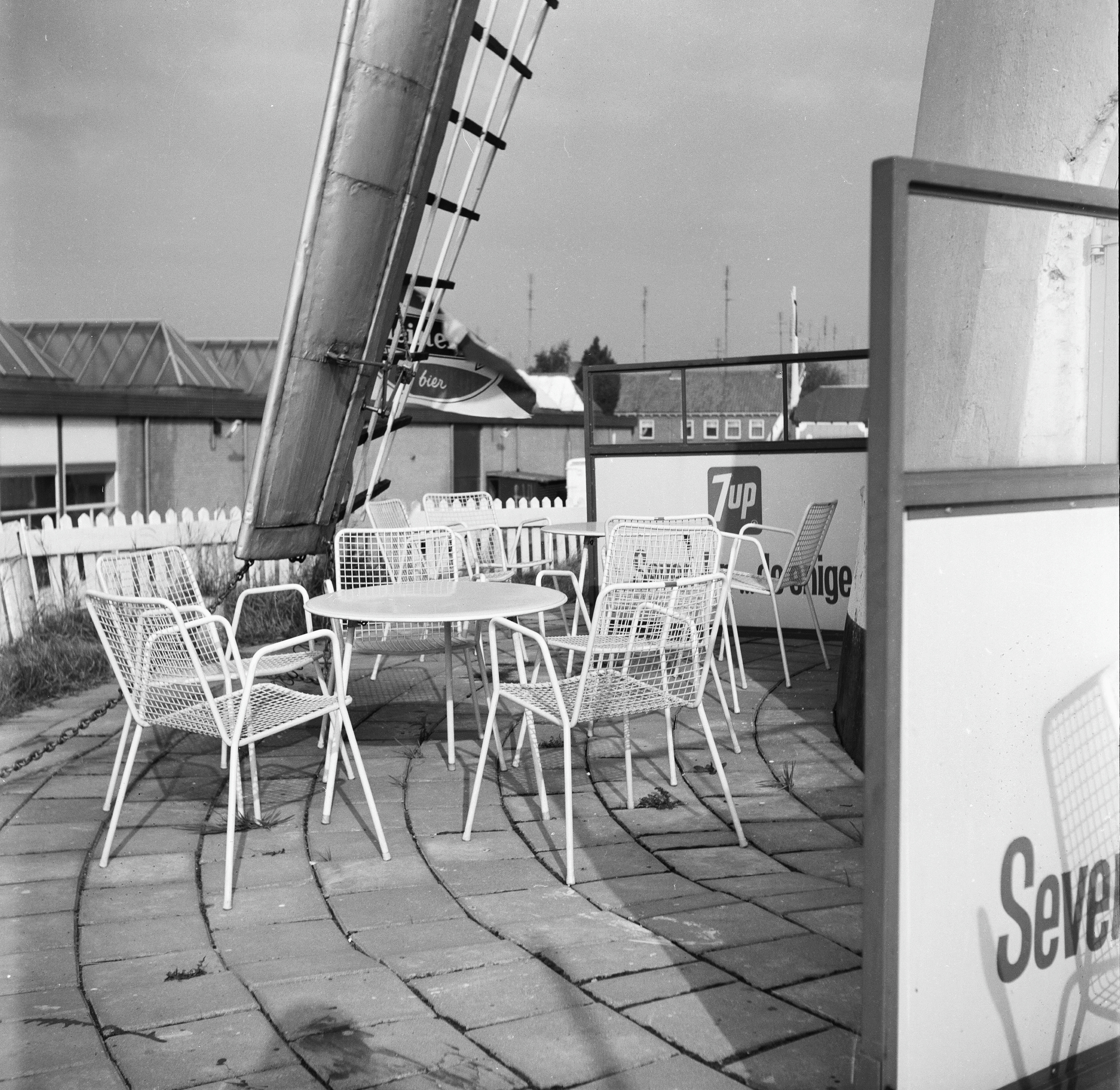
Terrace next to the mill
