= De Schoolmeester, Westzaan =

Smock mill in Westzaan, Netherlands

De Schoolmeester
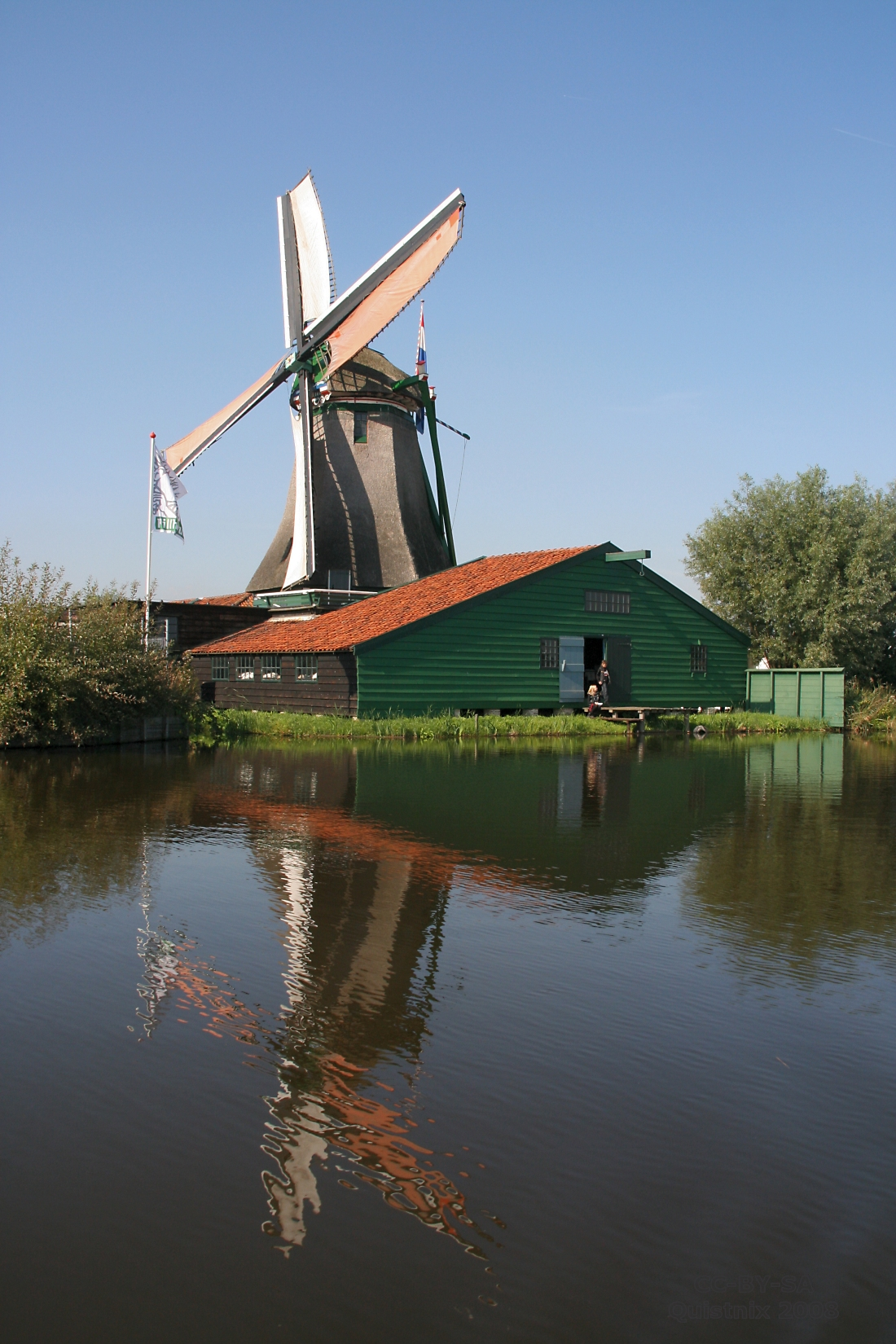
- De Schoolmeester, June 2003
- Interactive map of De Schoolmeester

Origin
- Mill name: De Schoolmeester
- Mill location: Guispad 3, 1551SX, Westzaan, Netherlands
- Coordinates: 52.468611°N 4.788611°E
- Operator: Vereniging De Zaansche Molen
- Year built: 1692

Information
- Purpose: Paper mill
- Type: Smock mill
- Storeys: Three-storey smock
- Base storeys: Two-storey base
- Smock sides: Six-sided smock
- No. of sails: Four sails
- Type of sails: Common sails
- Windshaft: Cast iron
- Winding: Tailpole and winch
- Auxiliary power: Steam engine, later replaced by a gas engine, then a diesel engine then an electric motor.
- Other information: Only remaining wind powered paper mill in the world

De Schoolmeester is a smock mill in Westzaan, Netherlands, which is maintained in full working order. It is the only wind-powered paper mill in the world. The mill is listed as Rijksmonument number 40013.

== History ==
The first paper mill in the Zaan region was built in 1605. De Schoolmeester was built in 1692. It is also known by the nickname De Gauwdief. The name De Schoolmeester (English: "the schoolmaster") probably denotes the occupation of one of the founders. The mill originally made grey paper. In 1778, the mill was powering two Hollander beaters. In 1852, the mill was bought by Gerbrand de Jong, who owned another wind-powered paper mill, De Kaarsenmaker at Zaandijk. He bought another nearby paper mill, De Vergulde Bijenkorf, in 1854. In 1871, the mills were owned by Gebroeders de Jong, who demolished De Kaarsenmaker in the autumn of 1873. In 1877, the mill was modernised and a steam engine installed as auxiliary power. This meant that the mill was uninsurable against fire. In 1902, the nearby De Vergulde Bijenkorf burnt down. A steam-driven paper factory was erected to replace it. This factory was able to make white paper. A fire started at De Schoolmeester in 1915 but was extinguished. In 1948, the steam engine was replaced by a Ford gas engine. On 1 March 1949, the drying sheds were damaged in a storm, with over 30 metres (98 ft) of them being affected. They were rebuilt shorter than they had been previously. On 28 August 1957, De Schoolmeester was sold to Vereniging van Nederlandsche Papierfabrikanten by the de Jongs. In 1964, the gas engine was replaced by a Bernard diesel engine. In 1977, the mill was bought by Vereniging Zaansche Molens. The diesel engine was replaced by an electric motor in 1979. A four-year restoration of the mill at a cost of €450,000 was completed in June 2002. The work included complete renewal of the drying sheds.

The number of times the sails revolved in recent years is recorded as:

Year	Revolutions
2002	558,000
2003	435,115
2004	649,896
2005	589,336
2006	560,379
2007	630,406
2008	537,498

== Description ==
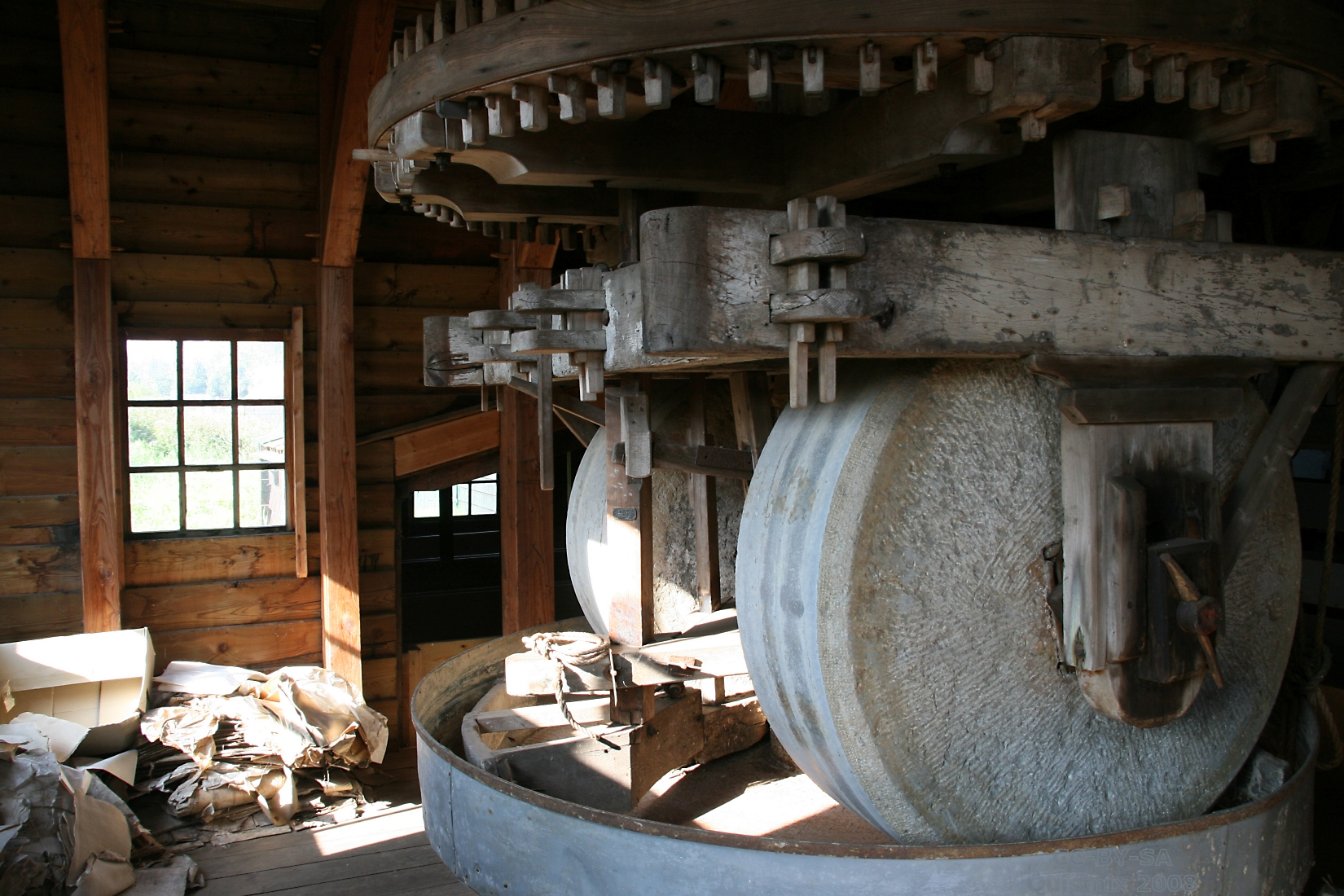
Edge runner stones

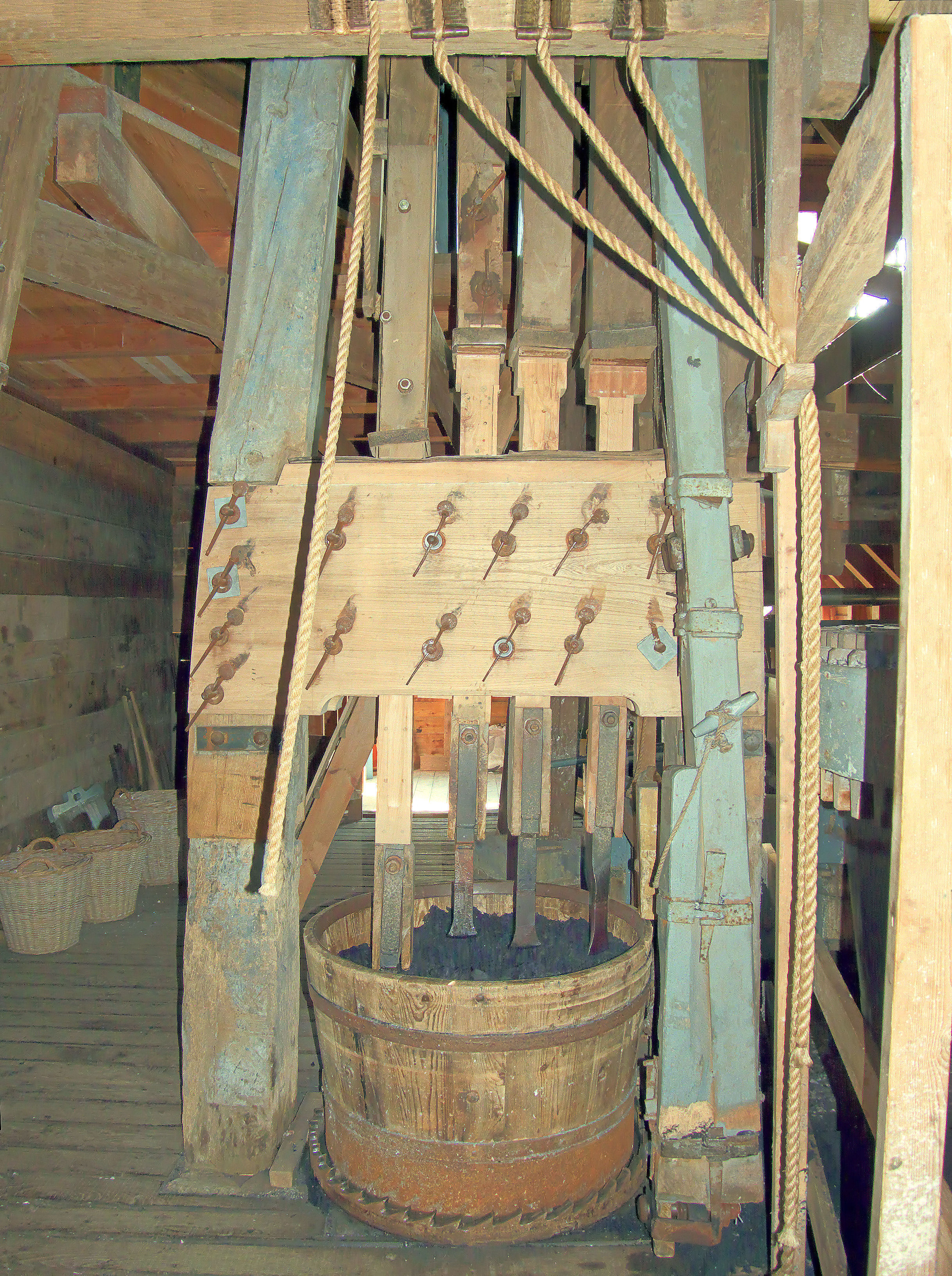
Stamp mill

De Schoolmeester is a six-sided smock mill with a stage, built on a two-storey base. The stage is 3.80 metres (12 ft 6 in) above ground level. The mill itself is at the centre of a long range of drying sheds of green-painted weatherboard under a pantile roof. The mill and cap are thatched with reeds. The cap is winded by a tailpole and winch. The four common sails drive the various items of paper-making machinery. There are three Hollander beaters. The sails on the inner stock span 20.50 metres (67 ft 3 in) and the sails on the outer stock span 20.70 metres (67 ft 11 in). They are carried on a cast-iron windshaft which was cast by Leiden millwrights D A Schrettlen & Co in 1860.

== Papermakers ==
- Gerbrand de Jong (1852–71)
- Gebroeders de Jong (1871–1952)
  - W Kat (1859–1929)
  - Cees Kruidenburg (1895–1955)
- Vereniging van Nederlandsche Papierfabrikanten (1952–77)
- Vereniging De Zaansche Molen (since 1977)

== Public access ==
De Schoolmeester is open from 10:00 to 16:00, Monday to Friday, and at other times by appointment.
