= Molenhoek, Rosmalen =

Coordinates: 51°42′32.51″N 5°21′46.71″E

Molenhoek (Dutch pronunciation: [ˈmoːlə(n)ˌɦuk]) is a neighbourhood in the village of Rosmalen, North Brabant, Netherlands. The neighbourhood can be found south of the railway track Tilburg - Nijmegen which passes through the municipality Rosmalen is part of, namely, 's-Hertogenbosch. Before 1900 Molenhoek was a hamlet, like all other neighbourhoods of Rosmalen south of the railway track. The Post mill Rosmalen, which was built in 1732, can be found in the neighbourhood Molenhoek.
