= Westzaan =

- Village
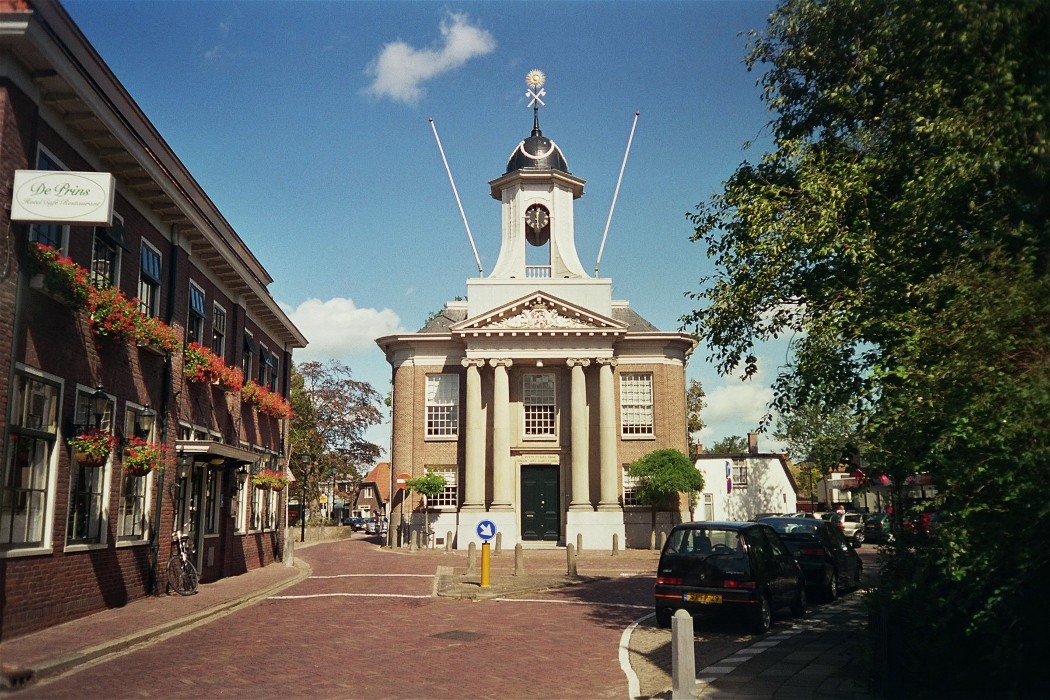
- Former town hall of Westzaan

- Coat of arms

- Location in the Netherlands Location in the province of North Holland in the Netherlands
- Coordinates: 52°28′N 4°46′E
- Country: Netherlands
- Province: North Holland
- Municipality: Zaanstad

Area
  - Total: 11.25 km^{2} (4.34 sq mi)
- Elevation: −0.6 m (−2.0 ft)

Population (2021)
  - Total: 4,955
  - Density: 440.4/km^{2} (1,141/sq mi)
- Time zone: UTC+1 (CET)
  - Summer (DST): UTC+2 (CEST)
- Postal code: 1551
- Dialing code: 075

Westzaan is a village in the Dutch province of North Holland. It is a part of the municipality of Zaanstad, and lies about 13 km northeast of Haarlem. It is located west of Zaandam, Koog aan de Zaan and Zaandijk, southwest of Wormer, southeast of Krommenie and south and southeast of Assendelft.

Westzaan developed in the 12th century as a peat excavation settlement. The Dutch Reformed church is a cruciform church with quarter round extensions in each corner. It was built between 1740 and 1741 and designed by Jan van der Streng. Originally the 1573 tower from the old church was retained, but it collapsed in 1843.

Westzaan was a separate municipality until 1974, when it became a part of Zaanstad.

Westzaan has the only wind powered paper mill in the world.
