= Rijksmonument =

Type of national heritage site in the Netherlands

Emblem for national monument introduced in 2014

A rijksmonument (Dutch pronunciation: [ˈrɛiksmoːnyˌmɛnt], lit. 'state monument') is a national heritage site of the Netherlands, listed by the agency Rijksdienst voor het Cultureel Erfgoed (RCE) acting for the Dutch Ministry of Education, Culture and Science.

At the end of February 2015, the Netherlands had 61,822 listed national heritage sites, of which approximately 1,500 are listed as archaeological sites.

== History and criteria ==
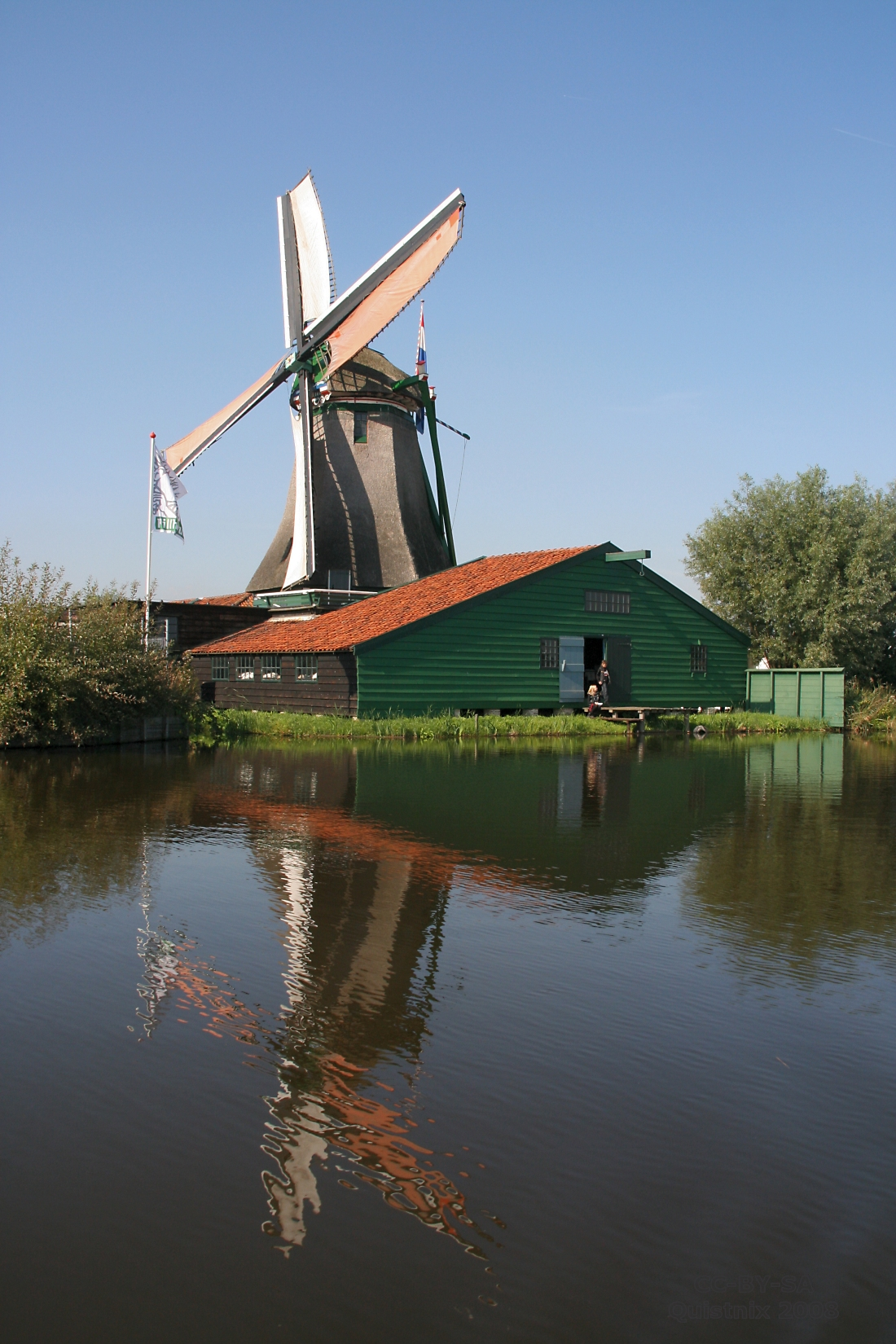
Many windmills are listed as rijksmonuments, such as De Schoolmeester, Westzaan

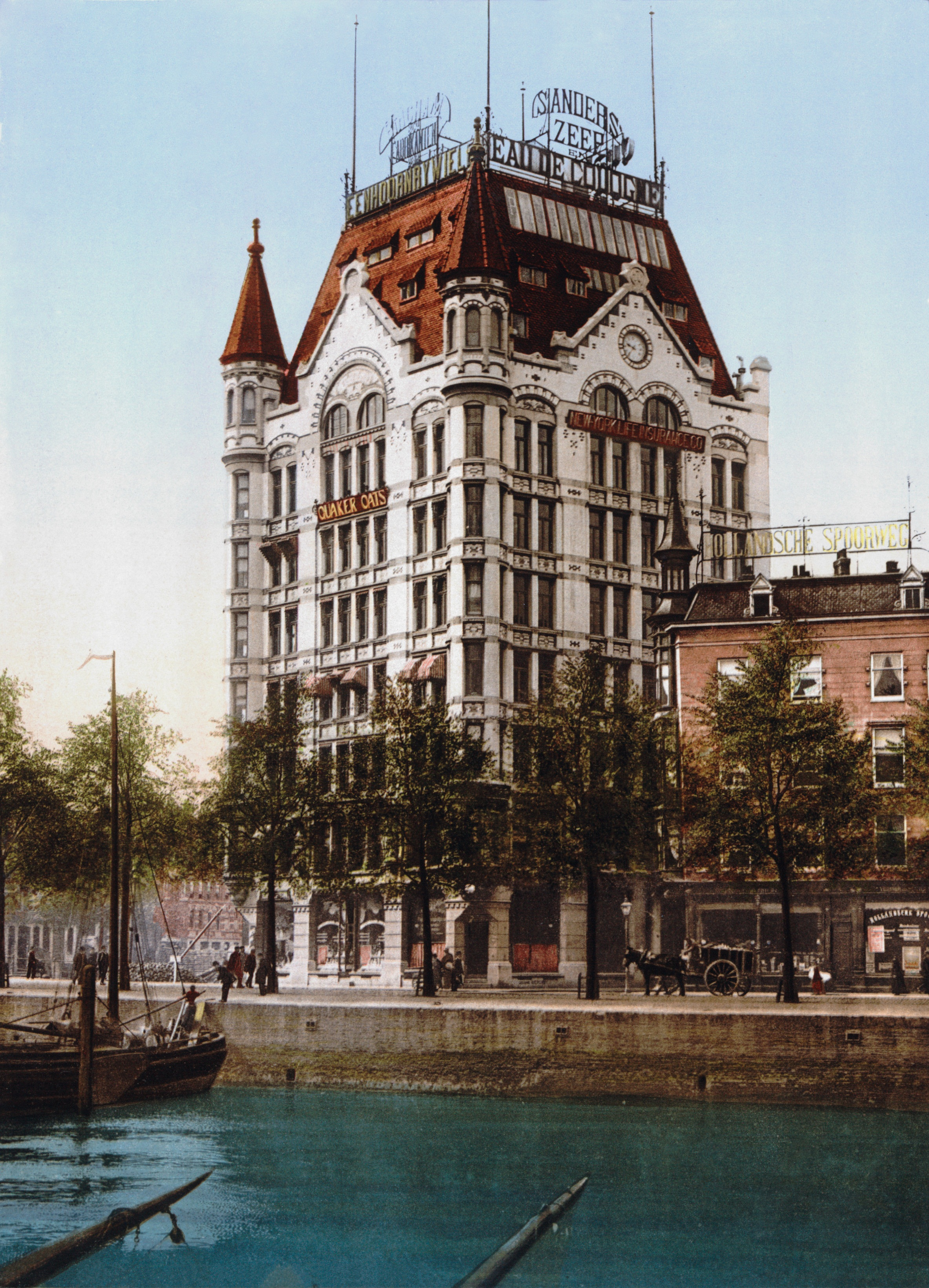
Witte Huis, in Rotterdam

Until 2012, a place had to be over 50 years old to be eligible for designation. This criterion expired on 1 January 2012.

The current legislation governing the monuments is the Monumentenwet van 1988 ("Monument Law of 1988").

The organization responsible for caring for the monuments, which used to be called Monumentenzorg, was recently renamed, and is now called Rijksdienst voor het Cultureel Erfgoed (national service for cultural heritage). In June 2009, the Court of The Hague decided that individual purchasers of buildings that were listed as rijksmonuments would be exempt from paying transfer tax, effective from 1 May 2009. Previously this exemption had only applied to juridical entities.

== Some examples ==
Many Dutch tourist attractions are rijksmonuments, such as castles or windmills. Some notable windmills are De Schoolmeester, Westzaan, a smock mill in North Holland, the only wind powered paper mill in the world, listed as rijksmonument number 40013; De Wieker Meule, De Wijk, in Drenthe province, built in 1829 and restored to working order, listed as rijksmonument number 39657; and Mellemolen, a hollow post mill in Friesland, also restored to working order, listed as rijksmonument number 35937. Among the rijksmonuments are also many churches. Most rijksmonuments are residential buildings, such as houses and villas.

== Other monuments in the Netherlands ==
- A provincial monument (provinciaal monument) is a monument designated by a province. In the Netherlands there are only two provinces that assign monuments, North Holland and Drenthe. The designation allows the provinces to protect the monuments and are a base for the regulation of subsidy for restoring the monuments.
- A municipal monument (gemeentelijk monument) is a monument designated by a municipality. A municipal monument is not of national importance but it is important for the region or city/village.
- An archeological monument.
- Protected city or landscape views.

== See also ==
- List of Rijksmonuments
- List of heritage registers
- Top 100 Dutch heritage sites
