= De Hoop =

De Hoop (English The Hope) is a name used for mills in Belgium and the Netherlands.

== Windmills ==
- De Hoop, Abbenbroek, in South Holland, Netherlands
- De Hoop, Almelo, in Overijssel, Netherlands
- De Hoop, Arnhem (1846), in Gelderland, Netherlands
- De Hoop, Arnhem (1849), in Gelderland, Netherlands
- De Hoop, Bavel, in North Brabant, Netherlands
- De Hoop, Bunschoten, a windmill in Utrecht, Netherlands
- De Hoop, Culemborg, in Gelderland, Netherlands
- De Hoop, Den Hout, in North Brabant, Netherlands
- De Hoop, Den Oever, in North Holland, Netherlands
- De Hoop, Dokkum, in Friesland, Netherlands
- De Hoop, Elden, a windmill in Gelderland, Netherlands
- De Hoop, Elen, a windmill in Limburg, Belgium
- De Hoop, Elspeet, a windmill in Gelderland, Netherlands
- De Hoop, Garderen, a windmill in Gelderland, Netherlands
- De Hoop, Garsthuizen, a windmill in Groningen, Netherlands
- De Hoop, Giesbeek, a windmill in Gelderland, Netherlands
- De Hoop, Gorinchem, a windmill in South Holland, Netherlands
- De Hoop, Harderwijk, a windmill in Gelderland, Netherlands
- De Hoop, Haren, a windmill in Groningen, Netherlands
- De Hoop, Hellendoorn, a windmill in Overijssel, Netherlands
- De Hoop, Hellevoetsluis, in South Holland, Netherlands
- De Hoop, Holwerd, in Friesland, Netherlands
- De Hoop, Horn, a windmill in Limburg, Netherlands
- De Hoop, Klarenbeek, a windmill in Gelderland, Netherlands
- De Hoop, Kropswolde, a windmill in Groningen, Netherlands
- De Hoop, Loenen aan de Vecht, a windmill in Utrecht, Netherlands
- De Hoop, Lunteren, a windmill in Gelderland, Netherlands
- De Hoop, Maasdam, a windmill in South Holland, Netherlands
- De Hoop, Maassluis, a windmill in South Holland, Netherlands
- De Hoop, Markelo, a windmill in Overijssel, Netherlands
- De Hoop, Maurik, a windmill in Gelderland, Netherlands
- De Hoop, Middelburg, a windmill in Zeeland, Netherlands
- De Hoop, Middelstum, a windmill in Groningen, Netherlands
- De Hoop, Nijkerk-Appel, a windmill in Gelderland, Netherlands
- De Hoop, Norg, in Drenthe, Netherlands
- De Hoop, Oldebroek, a windmill in Gelderland, Netherlands
- De Hoop, Oud-Alblas, a windmill in South Holland, Netherlands
- De Hoop, Ouddorp, in South Holland, Netherlands
- De Hoop, Oude Niedorp, a windmill in North Holland, Netherlands
- De Hoop, Oud-Zevenaar, in Gelderland, Netherlands
- De Hoop, Rha, a windmill in Gelderland, Netherlands
- De Hoop, Rijswijk, a windmill in Gelderland, Netherlands
- De Hoop, Roodkerk, in Friesland, Netherlands
- De Hoop, Roosendaal, a windmill in North Brabant, Netherlands
- De Hoop, Rozenburg, a windmill in South Holland, Netherlands
- De Hoop, Sint Philipsland, a windmill in Zeeland, Netherlands
- De Hoop, Sleen, in Drenthe, Netherlands
- De Hoop, Stiens, in Friesland, Netherlands
- De Hoop, Sprundel, a windmill in North Brabant, Netherlands
- De Hoop, Sumar, in Friesland, Netherlands
- De Hoop, Swartbroek, a windmill in Limburg, Netherlands
- De Hoop, Tholen, a windmill in Zeeland, Netherlands
- De Hoop, Veen, a windmill in North Brabant, Netherlands
- De Hoop, Vorden, a windmill in Gelderland, Netherlands
- De Hoop, Wachtum, in Drenthe, Netherlands
- De Hoop, Wemeldinge, a windmill in Zeeland, Netherlands
- De Hoop, Wervershoef, a windmill in North Holland, Netherlands
- De Hoop, Wieringerwaard, a windmill in North Holland, Netherlands
- De Hoop, Wolphaartsdijk, a windmill in Zeeland, Netherlands
- De Hoop, Zierikzee, a windmill in Zeeland, Netherlands
- De Hoop, Zoetermeer, a windmill in South Holland, Netherlands
- De Hoop, Zuilichem, a windmill in Gelderland, Netherlands
- De Hoop & Verwachting, Borssele, a windmill in Zeeland, Netherlands
- De Goede Hoop, Menen, a windmill in West Flanders, Belgium
- De Goede Hoop, Mijnsheerenland, a windmill in South Holland, Netherlands
- Hoop Doet Leven, Made, a windmill in North Brabant, Netherlands
- Hoop Doet Leven, Voorhout, a windmill in South Holland, Netherlands
- Hoop op Beter, Veendam, in Groningen, Netherlands which was moved to Wachtum
- Hoop van Zegen, Zuidwolde, in Drenthe, Netherlands
- Op Hoop van Beter, Ingen, a windmill in Gelderland, Netherlands

== Other uses ==
- De Hoop, Guyana, a municipality in Guyana
  - De Hoop Hindu Temple
- De Hoop Dam in Western Cape, South Africa
- De Hoop Dam (Limpopo) in Limpopo, South Africa
- De Hoop Nature Reserve in South Africa
- De Hoop, Western Cape in South Africa

== See also ==
- Hope (disambiguation)
