= List of windmills in North Brabant =

List of Dutch windmills

A list of windmills in the Dutch province of North Brabant.

Location	Name of mill	Type	Built	Notes	Photograph
Aalst	Aalstermolen	Beltmolen	1904	Molendatabase (in Dutch)	
Almkerk	Oude Doornse Molen	Grondzeiler	c. 1700	Molendatabase (in Dutch)	
Almkerk	Zandwijkse Molen	Wipmolen	1699	Molendatabase (in Dutch)	
Asten	De Oostenwind	Standerdmolen	18th century	Molendatabase (in Dutch)	
Bakel	Sint Willibrordus	Standerdmolen	1586	Molendatabase (in Dutch)	
Bavel	De Hoop	Beltmolen	1865	Molendatabase (in Dutch)	
Bergeijk	Bergeijk Windmill	Standerdmolen	c. 1758	Molendatabase (in Dutch)	
Beugen	Martinus	Beltmolen	1866	Molendatabase (in Dutch)	
Boekel	Boekel Windmill	Standerdmolen	1785	Molendatabase (in Dutch)	
Borkel	Sint Antonius Abt	Beltmolen	1865	Molendatabase (in Dutch)	
Budel	Janzona	Beltmolen	1937	Molendatabase (in Dutch)	
Budel	Nooit Gedacht	Stellingmolen	1846	Molendatabase (in Dutch)	
Budel	Zeldenrust	Bergmolen			
Den Dungen-Maaskantje	De Pelikaan	Beltmolen	1864	Molendatabase (in Dutch)	
Den Hout	De Hoop	Beltmolen	1837	Molendatabase (in Dutch)	
Deurne	Holten's Molen	Beltmolen	1890	Molendatabase (in Dutch)	
Deurne	Maria-Antoinette	Beltmolen	1893	Molendatabase (in Dutch)	
Dieden	Stella Polaris	Stellingmolen	1866	Molendatabase (in Dutch)	
Dongen	Koningin Wilhelmina	Stellingmolen	1893	Molendatabase (in Dutch)	
Drunen	Hertogin van Brabant	Beltmolen	1838	Molendatabase (in Dutch)	
Dussen	Noordeveldse Molen; Nieuwe Molen	Wipmolen	1797	Molendatabase (in Dutch)	
Eindhoven (Acht)	Annemie	Beltmolen	1891	Molendatabase (in Dutch)	
Etten	De Bisschopsmolen	Stellingmolen	1744	Molendatabase (in Dutch)	
Gassel	Bergzicht	Beltmolen	1817	Molendatabase (in Dutch)	
Geffen	De Vlijt	Standerdmolen	1875	Molendatabase (in Dutch). Built in 1675 at Boxtel, moved here in 1875.	
Geffen	Zeldenrust	Standerdmolen	2008	Molendatabase (in Dutch). Built in 1621, moved in 1870, blown down 18 January 2007, rebuilt in 2008.	
Geldrop	't Nupke	Beltmolen	1843	Molendatabase (in Dutch)	
Gemert	De Bijenkorf	Stellingmolen	1908	Molendatabase (in Dutch). built at Zaandijk, North Holland in 1665, dismantled in 1907 and rebuilt here in 1908.	
Goirle	De Visscher	Beltmolen	1875	Molendatabase (in Dutch)	
Goirle	De Wilde	Beltmolen	1898	Molendatabase (in Dutch)	
Halsteren	Sancto Antonio; Sint Antonius	Beltmolen	1817	Molendatabase (in Dutch)	
Hank	Zuidhollandse Molen	Grondzeiler	1791	Molendatabase (in Dutch)	
Hapert	Hapert Windmill	Grondzeiler	1896	Molendatabase (in Dutch)	
Haps	Mariamolen	Beltmolen	1797	Molendatabase (in Dutch)	
Heensche Molen	De Vos; Heensche Molen	Grondzeiler	1714	Molendatabase (in Dutch)	
Heeze	Sint Victor	Beltmolen	1852	Molendatabase (in Dutch)	
Heusden	Nummer I	Standerdmolen	1971	Molendatabase (in Dutch)	
Heusedn	Nummer II	Standerdmolen	1973	Molendatabase (in Dutch)	
Heusden	Nummer III	Standerdmolen	1975	Molendatabase (in Dutch)	
Hilvarenbeek	De Doornboom	Beltmolen	1856	Molendatabase (in Dutch)	
Hoeven	De Toekomst	Beltmolen	1862	Molendatabase (in Dutch)	
Hooge Zwaluwe	Zeldenrust	Stellingmolen	1866	Molendatabase (in Dutch)	
Huijbergen	Johanna	Beltmolen	1862	Molendatabase (in Dutch)	
Kaatsheuvel	De Couwenbergh	Beltmolen	1849	Molendatabase (in Dutch)	
Kaatsheuvel	De Eendragt	Stellingmolen	1870	Molendatabase (in Dutch)	
Katwijk-Linden	Katwijk-Linden Windmill	Stellingmolen	c. 1876	Molendatabase (in Dutch)	
Leur	De Lelie	Stellingmolen	1998	Molendatabase (in Dutch)	
Leur	Zwartenbergse Molen	Grondzeiler	1889	Molendatabase (in Dutch)	
Lieshout	De Leest	Beltmolen	1899	Molendatabase (in Dutch)	
Lieshout	Vogelenzang; Beltmolen	Beltmolen	1819	Molendatabase (in Dutch)	
Liessel	De Volksvriend	Beltmolen	1903	Molendatabase (in Dutch)	
Lith	Zeldenrust	Beltmolen	1800	Molendatabase (in Dutch)	
Luyksgestel	De Deen	Beltmolen	1839	Molendatabase (in Dutch)	
Made	Hoop Doet Leven	Beltmolen	1867	Molendatabase (in Dutch)	
Meerveldhoven	De Adriaan	Beltmolen	1906	Molendatabase (in Dutch)	
Meeuwen	De Witte Molen	Grondzeiler	1740	Molendatabase (in Dutch)	
Megen	Désiré	Stellingmolen	1865	Molendatabase (in Dutch)	
Mierlo	Mierlo Windmill	Standerdmolen	1640	Molendatabase (in Dutch)	
Mierlo-Ellenaar	Elderse Molen; De Ellenaar	Beltmolen	1851	Molendatabase (in Dutch)	
Milheeze	Laurentia	Beltmolen	1890	Molendatabase (in Dutch)	
Mill	De Korenbloem	Beltmolen	1847	Molendatabase (in Dutch)	
Moergestel	Moergestel Windmill	Standerdmolen	1852	Molendatabase (in Dutch)	
Nieuw-Borgvliet	De Twee Vrienden	Beltmolen	1890	Molendatabase (in Dutch)	
Nieuw-Vossemeer	Assumburg	Stellingmolen	1897	Molendatabase (in Dutch)	
Nieuwkuijk	Emma	Stellingmolen	1886	Molendatabase (in Dutch)	
Nispen	Molen Van Aerden	Beltmolen	1850	Molendatabase (in Dutch)	
Nistelrode	Windlust	Standerdmolen	1898	Molendatabase (in Dutch)	
Nuenen	De Roosdonck	Beltmolen	1884	Molendatabase (in Dutch)	
Oeffelt	De Vooruitgang	Beltmolen	1913	Molendatabase (in Dutch)	
Oirschot	De Korenaar	Stellingmolen	1857	Molendatabase (in Dutch)	
Oisterwijk	Kerkhovense Molen; Onvermoeid	Stellingmolen	1895	Molendatabase (in Dutch)	
Oploo	De Korenbloem	Standerdmolen		Molendatabase (in Dutch)	
Oss	Nieuwe Leven	Stellingmolen	1895	Molendatabase (in Dutch)	
Oss	Zeldenrust; De Zwaluw	Stellingmolen	1860	Molendatabase (in Dutch)	
Oudemolen	De Oude Molen	Stellingmolen	1845	Molendatabase (in Dutch)	
Raamsdonksveer	De Onvermoide	Stellingmolen	1890	Molendatabase (in Dutch)	
Ravenstein	De Nijverheid; De Raaf	Stellingmolen	1857	Molendatabase (in Dutch)	
Reek	De Hellemolen	Beltmolen	1832	Molendatabase (in Dutch)	
Rijkevoort	Luctor et Emergo	Stellingmolen	1901	Molendatabase (in Dutch)	
Roosendaal	De Hoop	Standerdmolen	1896	Molendatabase (in Dutch). Built in 1684 at Schaerbeek, Belgium, moved to the district Helmet in Schaerbeek in 1783, moved to Maarksem in 1885, moved here in 1896.	
Roosendaal	De Twee Gebroeders	Stellingmolen	1872	Molendatabase (in Dutch)	
Rosmalen	Rosmalen Windmill	Standerdmolen	1732	Molendatabase (in Dutch)	
Rucpen-Bosschenhoofd	De Heimolen	Beltmolen	1866	Molendatabase (in Dutch)	
Schaijk	De Onderneming	Beltmolen	1888	Molendatabase (in Dutch)	
Schijndel	Aan de Pegstukken	Beltmolen	1845	Molendatabase (in Dutch)	
Schijndel	Catharina	Beltmolen	1837	Molendatabase (in Dutch)	
Sint Agatha	Jan van Cuyk	Beltmolen	1860	Molendatabase (in Dutch)	
Sint Hubert	De Heimolen	Beltmolen	1878	Molendatabase (in Dutch)	
Sleeuwijk	Uitwijkse Molen	Wipmolen	1700	Molendatabase (in Dutch)	
Someren	De Victor	Beltmolen	1853	Molendatabase (in Dutch)	
Someren	Den Eveert	Standerdmolen	1543	Molendatabase (in Dutch)	
Sprang	Dye Sprancke	Standerdmolen	1855	Molendatabase (in Dutch)	
Sprundel	De Hoop	Beltmolen	1840	Molendatabase (in Dutch)	
Sint Michielsgestel	De Genenberg	Beltmolen	1841	Molendatabase (in Dutch)	
Terheijden	De Arend	Stellingmolen	1742	Molendatabase (in Dutch)	
Uden	Molen van Jeffen	Standerdmolen	1811	Molendatabase (in Dutch)	
Ulvenhout	De Korenbloem	Beltmolen	1909	Molendatabase (in Dutch)	
Veen	De Hoop	Stellingmolen	1838	Molendatabase (in Dutch)	
Veldhoven	Sint Jan	Stellingmolen			
Veldhoven-Zeelst	Zilster Molen	Beltmolen	1858	Molendatabase (in Dutch)	
Vessem	Jacobus	Beltmolen	1893	Molendatabase (in Dutch)	
Vlierden	Johanna-Elisabeth	Beltmolen	1844	Molendatabase (in Dutch)	
Volkel	De Neije Kreiter	Standerdmolen	1988	Molendatabase (in Dutch)	
Vorstenbosch	Windlust	Beltmolen	1820	Molendatabase (in Dutch)	
Wanroij	Hamse Molen; De Ster	Standerdmolen	1811	Molendatabase (in Dutch)	
Werkendam	Vervoorne Molen	Grondzeiler	1700	Molendatabase (in Dutch)	
Wijk en Aalburg	De Twee Gebroeders	Stellingmolen	1872	Molendatabase (in Dutch)	
Willemstad	D'Orangemolen	Stellingmolen	1734	Molendatabase (in Dutch)	
Woudrichem	Nooit Gedacht	Stellingmolen	1995	Molendatabase (in Dutch)	
Wouw	De Arend	Beltmolen	1811	Molendatabase (in Dutch)	
Zeeland	Aarssensemolen; De Dageraad	Beltmolen	1932	Molendatabase (in Dutch)	
Zeeland	Coppensmolen	Beltmolen	1883	Molendatabase (in Dutch)	
Zeeland-Oventje	Sint Victor	Stellingmolen	1938	Molendatabase (in Dutch)	
Zevenbergen	Fleur	Stellingmolen	1841	Molendatabase (in Dutch)	
Zundert	De Akkermolen	Standerdmolen	1625	Molendatabase (in Dutch)	
