= Zeldenrust =

Zeldenrust is a name given to some windmills in Belgium, Germany and the Netherlands.

- Zeldenrust, Budel, a windmill in North Brabant, the Netherlands
- Zeldenrust, Dokkum a windmill in Friesland, the Netherlands
- Zeldenrüst, Emden, a windmill in Lower Saxony, Germany
- Zeldenrust, Geffen, a windmill in North Brabant, the Netherlands
- Zeldenrust, Hooge Zwaluwe, a windmill in North Brabant, the Netherlands
- Zeldenrust, Lith, a windmill in North Brabant, the Netherlands
- Zeldenrust, Nieuw-Schiemda a windmill in Groningen, the Netherlands
- Zeldenrust, Oss, a windmill in North Brabant, the Netherlands
- Zeldenrust, Overasselt a windmill in Gelderland, the Netherlands
- Zeldenrust, Viersel, a windmill in Antwerp, Belgium
- Zeldenrust, Westerwijtwerd a windmill in Groningen, the Netherlands
- Zeldenrust, Zuidbarge, a windmill in Drenthe, the Netherlands

== People with the surname ==
- Furhgill Zeldenrust (born 1989), Dutch footballer
- Salomon Zeldenrust (1884–1958), Dutch fencer
