= Aan de Pegstukken =

Windmill in the Netherlands

At the Pegstukken
- Aan de Pegstukken
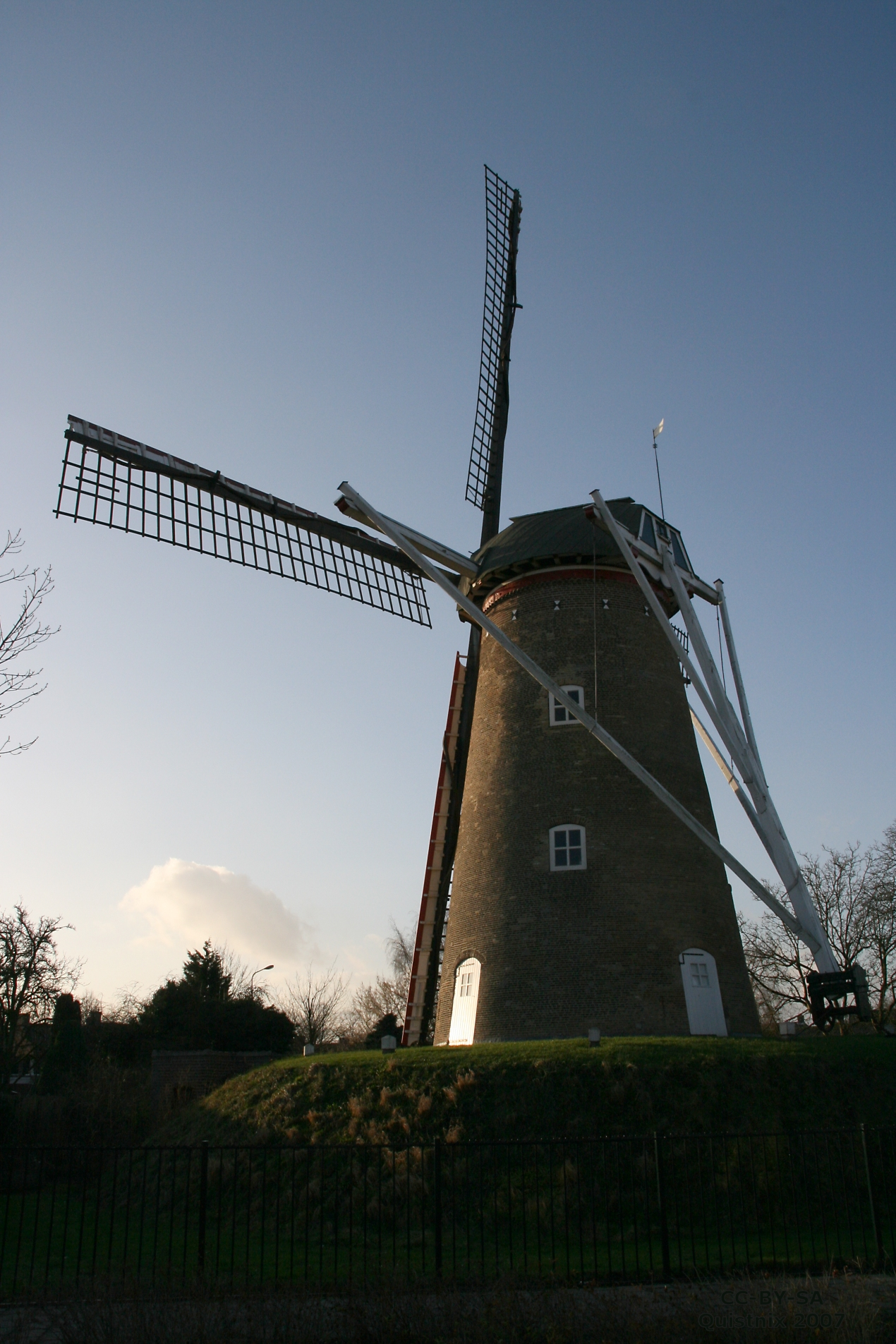
- Aan de Pegstukken in 2007

General information
- Status: Rijksmonument (33574)
- Type: Windmill
- Address: De Pegstukken 27; 5482 GC, Schijndel
- Town or city: Schijndel
- Country: Netherlands
- Coordinates: 51.615278°N 5.445°E
- Completed: 1845
- Designations: Gristmill, currently out of service

References
- Database of Mills; De Hollandsche Molen

Aan de Pegstukken (English: At the Pegstukken) is a windmill located on De Pegstukken 27 in Schijndel, North Brabant, Netherlands. Built in 1845 on an artificial hill, the windmill functioned as a gristmill. The mill was built as a tower mill and its sails have a span of 25.25 metres (82.8 ft). The mill is a national monument (nr 33574) since 19 September 1973. The name of the mill comes from the street it is located on.

== History ==
The mill was built in 1845 on order of the family De Backer. During World War II it was part of the frontline and took damage. It was restored after the war. In 1967 the municipality bought the mill from the De Backer family and had it restored. In later days houses were built around the mill, decreasing its visibility and the wind it can catch.

The mill is open to the public once a week on Saturdays.

== Gallery of images ==
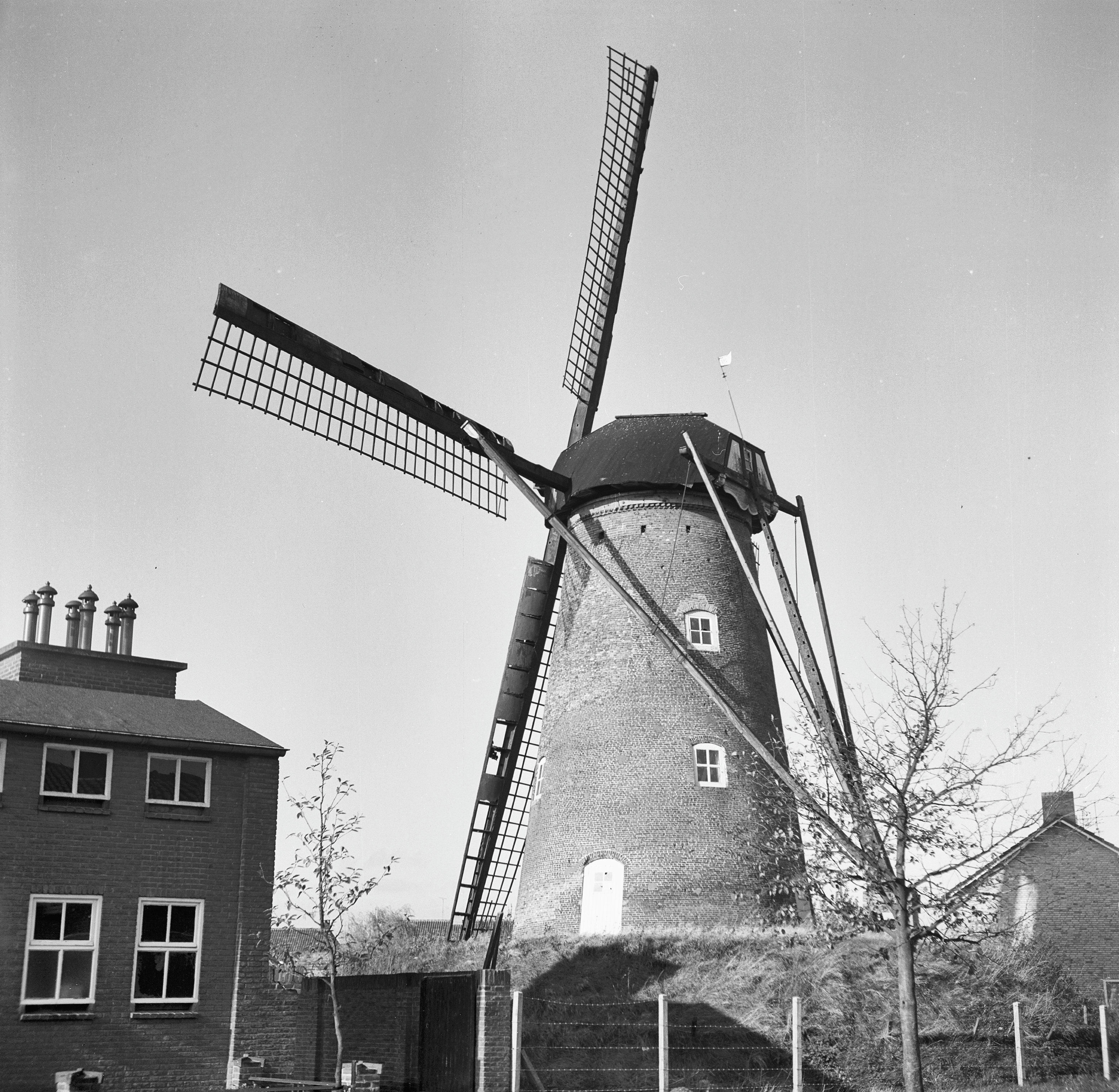
The mill and its surrounding buildings

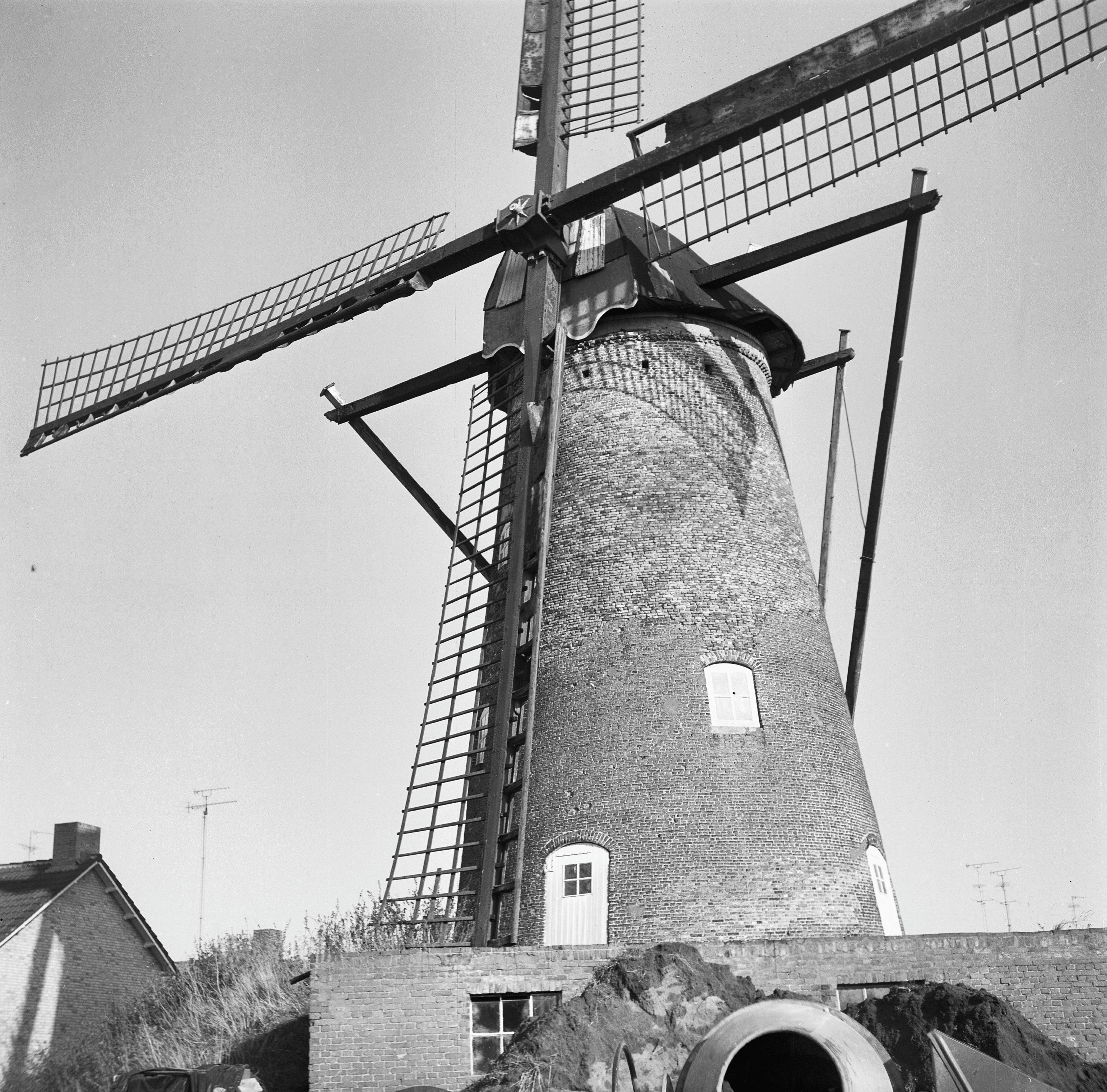
The mill is built on an artificial hill
