= List of windmills in Groningen =

List of Dutch windmills

A list of windmills in the Dutch province of Groningen.

Location	Name of mill	Type	Built	Notes	Photograph
Adorp	Aeolus	Stellingmolen	1851	Molendatabase (in Dutch)	
Aduard	Eolus	Grondzeiler	1821	Molendatabase (in Dutch)	
Bellingwolde	Veldkamps Meul'n	Stellingmolen	1855	Molendatabase (in Dutch)	
Bourtange	Bourtange Windmill	standerdmolen	1980	Molendatabase (in Dutch)	
Damsterdiep	Concordia	Grondzeiler	1771	Moved to Nord-Sleen, Drenthe in 1904. Molendatabase (in Dutch)	
Delfzijl	Adam	Stellingmolen	1875	Molendatabase (in Dutch)	
Den Andel	De Jonge Hendrik	Stellingmolen	1875	Molendatabase (in Dutch)	
Den Ham	De Eolus	Grondzeiler			
Eemshaven	Goliath	Grondzeiler	1897	Molendatabase (in Dutch)	
Eenrum	De Lelie	Stellingmolen	1862	Molendatabase (in Dutch)	
Enumatil	Eben Haëzer	Stellingmolen	1907	Molendatabase (in Dutch)	
Enumatil	Molen van Hofman	Achtkantmolen	1845	Dismantled 1890, rebuilt at Peize, Drenthe in 1898. Molendatabase (in Dutch); De Hollandsche Molen (in Dutch)	
Farmsum	Aeolus	Stellingmolen	1977	Built in 1811 by the Eemskanaal, moved in 1977. Molendatabase (in Dutch).	
Farmsum	De Flikkezijlsterpoldermolen	Achtkantmolen		Moved to Weerdinge, Drenthe in 1910. Molendatabase (in Dutch); De Hollandsche Molen (in Dutch)	
Feerwerd	Joeswert	Stellingmolen	1855	Molendatabase (in Dutch)	
Ganzedijk	Ganzedijk Windmill	Stellingmolen	1868	Molendatabase (in Dutch)	
Garmerwolde	Langelandster Molen	Grondzeiler	1829	Molendatabase (in Dutch)	
Garnwerd	De Meeuw	Stellingmolen	1851	Molendatabase (in Dutch)	
Garsthuizen	De Hoop	Stellingmolen	1839	Molendatabase (in Dutch)	
Glimmen	De Witte Molen	Grondzeiler	1892	Molendatabase (in Dutch)	
Grijpskerk	De Kievit	Stellingmolen	1899	Molendatabase (in Dutch)	
Grijpskerk	Westerhornermolen	Grondzeiler	1829	Molendatabase (in Dutch)	
Haren	De Hoop	Stellingmolen	1843	Molendatabase (in Dutch)	
Haren-Hoornsedijk	De Helper	Grondzeiler	1863	Molendatabase (in Dutch)	
Harkstede	Stel's Molen	Stellingmolen	1851	Molendatabase (in Dutch)	
Heiligerglee	Molen Oldampt	Kleine molen	1999	Built in Scheemda in 1960, moved here in 1999. Molendatabase (in Dutch).	
Hoeksmeer	De Meervogel	Grondzeiler	1801	Demolished 1960; Molendatabase (in Dutch)	
Hoogkerk	De Poffert; Gebroeders Bos	Achtkantmolen	c1862	Demolished 1963; Molendatabase (in Dutch); De Hollandsche Molen (in Dutch)	
Kantens	Grote Geert	Stellingmolen	1818	Molendatabase (in Dutch)	
Kantens	De Kooi	Achtkantmolen	1877	Molendatabase (in Dutch); De Hollandsche Molen (in Dutch)	
Kolham	(unnamed)	Grondzeiler	1831	Burnt down 1880	
Kolham	Entreprise	Stellingmolen	1880	Burnt down 1906	
Kolham	Entreprise	Stellingmolen	1906	Burnt down 19 June 2000; Molendatabase (in Dutch)	
Kolham	Entreprise	Stellingmolen	2010	Molendatabase (in Dutch); De Hollandsche Molens (in Dutch)	
Kropswolde	De Hoop	Grondzeiler	1923	Molendatabase (in Dutch)	
Kropswolde	Molen Kikkoman	Iron windpump	1925	Molendatabase (in Dutch)	
Kropswolde	Koetze Tibbe	Iron windpump	1935	Molendatabase (in Dutch)	
Laskwerd	Olinger Koloniemolen	Grondzeiler	1900	Molendatabase (in Dutch)	
Leegkerk	De Jonge Held	Grondzeiler	1829	Molendatabase (in Dutch)	
Loppersum	De Stormvogel	Stellingmolen	1849	Molendatabase (in Dutch)	
Mensingeweer	Hollands Welvart	Stellingmolen	1855	Molendatabase (in Dutch)	
Mensingeweer				Moved to Veenoord, Drenthe in 1904.Molendatabase (in Dutch); De Hollandsche Molen (in Dutch)	
Middelstum	De Hoop	Stellingmolen	1855	Molendatabase (in Dutch)	
Middelstum	Molen van Faber	Achtkantmolen		Moved to Schoonoord, Drenthe in 1903. Molendatabase (in Dutch); De Hollandsche Molen (in Dutch)	
Niebert	Neibert Windmill	Stellingmolen	1899	Molendatabase (in Dutch)	
Nieuw-Scheemda	Paaltjasker Nieuw-Scheemda	Tjasker	1992	Molendatabase (in Dutch)	
Nieuw-Scheemda	De Dellen	Grondzeiler	1855	Molendatabase (in Dutch)	
Nieuw-Scheemda	Westerse Molen; Zeldenrust	Grondzeiler	1862	Molendatabase (in Dutch)	
Nieuwe-Pekela	De Zwaluw	Stellingmolen	1891	Molendatabase (in Dutch)	
Niezijl	Zwakkenburger Molen	Grondzeiler	1865	Molendatabase (in Dutch)	
Noordbroek	De Noordster	Stellingmolen	1849	Molendatabase (in Dutch)	
Noordbroeksterhamrik	De Noordermolen	Grondzeiler	1805	Molendatabase (in Dutch)	
Noorddijk	Noordermolen	Grondzeiler	1888	Molendatabase (in Dutch)	
Noorderhoogebrug	Wilhelmina; De Leeuw	Stellingmolen	1907	Molendatabase (in Dutch)	
Noordhorn	De Fortuin; De Specht	Stellingmolen	1890	Molendatabase (in Dutch)	
Noordlaren	De Korenschoof	Stellingmolen	1849	Molendatabase (in Dutch)	
Noordlaren	De Oosterpoldermolen	Grondzeiler	1862	Dismantled 1953, re-erected at the Netherlands Open Air Museum, Arnhem, Gelderland in 1960. Molendatabase (in Dutch)	
Oldehove	Aeolus	Stellingmolen	1846	Molendatabase (in Dutch)	
Oldehove	De Leeuw	Stellingmolen	1855	Molendatabase (in Dutch)	
Onderdendam	De Zilvermeeuw	Grondzeiler	1870	Molendatabase (in Dutch)	
Onnen	De Biks	Grondzeiler	1857	Molendatabase (in Dutch)	
Oostwold	Oostwolderpoldermolen	Grondzeiler	1856	Moved to Burdaard, Friesland in 1867. Molendatabase (in Dutch)	
Oosterhoogebrug		Grondzeiler	1871	Moved to Buitenpost, Friesland in 1959. De Hollandsche Molen (in Dutch)	
Oude-Pekela	De Onrust	Stellingmolen	1850	Molendatabase (in Dutch)	
Oude Pekela		Achtkantmolen		Moved to Emmer-Compascuum, Drenthe in 1907. Molendatabase (in Dutch); De Hollandsche Molen (in Dutch)	
Overschild	Windlust	Stellingmolen	1859	Molendatabase (in Dutch)	
Pieterburen	De Vier Winden	Stellingmolen	1846	Molendatabase (in Dutch)	
Sebaldeburen	De Eendracht	Grondzeiler	1887	Molendatabase (in Dutch)	
Slochteren	Groote Polder Molen	Grondzeiler	1783	Molendatabase (in Dutch)	
Slochteren	De Ruiten	Grondzeiler	1935	Molendatabase (in Dutch)	
Slochteren	Fraeylemamolen; Meneersmeulen; Lutje Meulen	Grondzeiler	1786	Molendatabase (in Dutch)	
Spijk	Ceres	Stellingmolen	1839	Molendatabase (in Dutch)	
Ten Boer	Bovenrijge	Stellingmolen	1985	Molendatabase (in Dutch)	
Ten Boer	De Widde Meuln	Stellingmolen	1839	Molendatabase (in Dutch)	
Ten Post	Olle Widde	Stellingmolen	1828	Molendatabase (in Dutch)	
Ter Haar	Ter Haar Windmill	Standerdmolen	1832	Molendatabase (in Dutch)	
Termunten	Overwinningpoldermolen	Grondzeiler	1873	Burnt down 1944	
Thesinge	Germania	Stellingmolen	1825	Molendatabase (in Dutch)	
Uithuizen	De Liefde	Stellingmolen	1866	Molendatabase (in Dutch)	
Usquert	Eva	Stellingmolen	1891	Molendatabase (in Dutch)	
Usquert	Apollo; Molen van Grashuis	Stellingmolen	1851	Moved to Noord Sleen, Drenthe in 1906. Molendatabase (in Dutch); De Hollandsche Molen (in Dutch)	
Veelerveen	Niemansmolen	Stellingmolen	1916	Molendatabase (in Dutch)	
Veendam	Hoop op Beter	Achtkantmolen		Moved to Wachtum, Drenthe in 1894. Molendatabase (in Dutch); De Hollandsche Molen (in Dutch)	
Veendam	Welgelegen	Achtkantmolen		Moved to Kollum, Friesland in 1892. Molendatabase (in Dutch); De Hollandsch Molen (in Dutch)	
Vierhuizen	De Onderneming	Stellingmolen	1858	Molendatabase (in Dutch)	
Vierverlaten	Zuidwendinger Molen	Grondzeiler	1819	Molendatabase (in Dutch)	
Visvliet	Hilmahuistermolen	Grondzeiler	1868	Molendatabase (in Dutch)	
Vlagtwedde				Moved to Veenoord, Drenthe, 1862. Molendatabase (in Dutch); De Hollandsche Molen (in Dutch)	
Vriescheloo	De Korenbloem	Stellingmolen	1895	Molendatabase (in Dutch)	
Wedderbergen	Weddermarke	Grondzeiler	1898	Molendatabase (in Dutch)	
Wedderveer	De Olde Molen	Achtkantmolen	1815	Moved to Palm Beach, Aruba, 1960	
Wedderveer	Spinnenkop Wedderveer	Spinnenkop	1938	Molendatabase (in Dutch)	
Westerwijtwerd	De Palen	Grondzeiler	1882	Molendatabase (in Dutch)	
Westerwijtwerd	Zeldenrust	Stellingmolen	1845	Molendatabase (in Dutch)	
Wetsinge	Eureka	Stellingmolen	1872	Molendatabase (in Dutch)	
Winschoten	Molen Berg	Stellingmolen	1854	Molendatabase (in Dutch)	
Winschoten	Molen Dijkstra	Stellingmolen	1862	Molendatabase (in Dutch)	
Winschoten	Molen Edens; De Volharding	Stellingmolen	1763	Molendatabase (in Dutch)	
Winsum	De Ster	Stellingmolen	1851	Molendatabase (in Dutch)	
Winsum	De Vriendschap	Stellingmolen	1801	Molendatabase (in Dutch)	
Woltersum	Fram	Stellingmolen	1861	Molendatabase (in Dutch)	
Zandeweer	Windlust	Stellingmolen	1818	Molendatabase (in Dutch)	
Zeerijp	De Leeus	Stellingmolen	1865	Molendatabase (in Dutch)	
Zuidwolde	't Witte Lam	Grondzeiler	1860	Molendatabase (in Dutch)	
Zuidwolde	Krimstermolen; Phoenix	Grondzeiler	1904	Molendatabase (in Dutch)	
Zuidwolde	Koningslaagte	Grondzeiler	1878	Molendatabase (in Dutch)	
Zuurdijk	De Zwaluw	Stellingmolen	1858	Molndatabase (in Dutch)	

== Notes ==
Mills still standing marked in bold. Known building dates are bold, otherwise the date is the earliest known date the mill was standing.

Unless otherwise indicated, the source for all entries is the linked Molendatabase or De Hollandsche Molen entry.
