= 't Nupke, Geldrop =

Windmill in the Netherlands

't Nupke
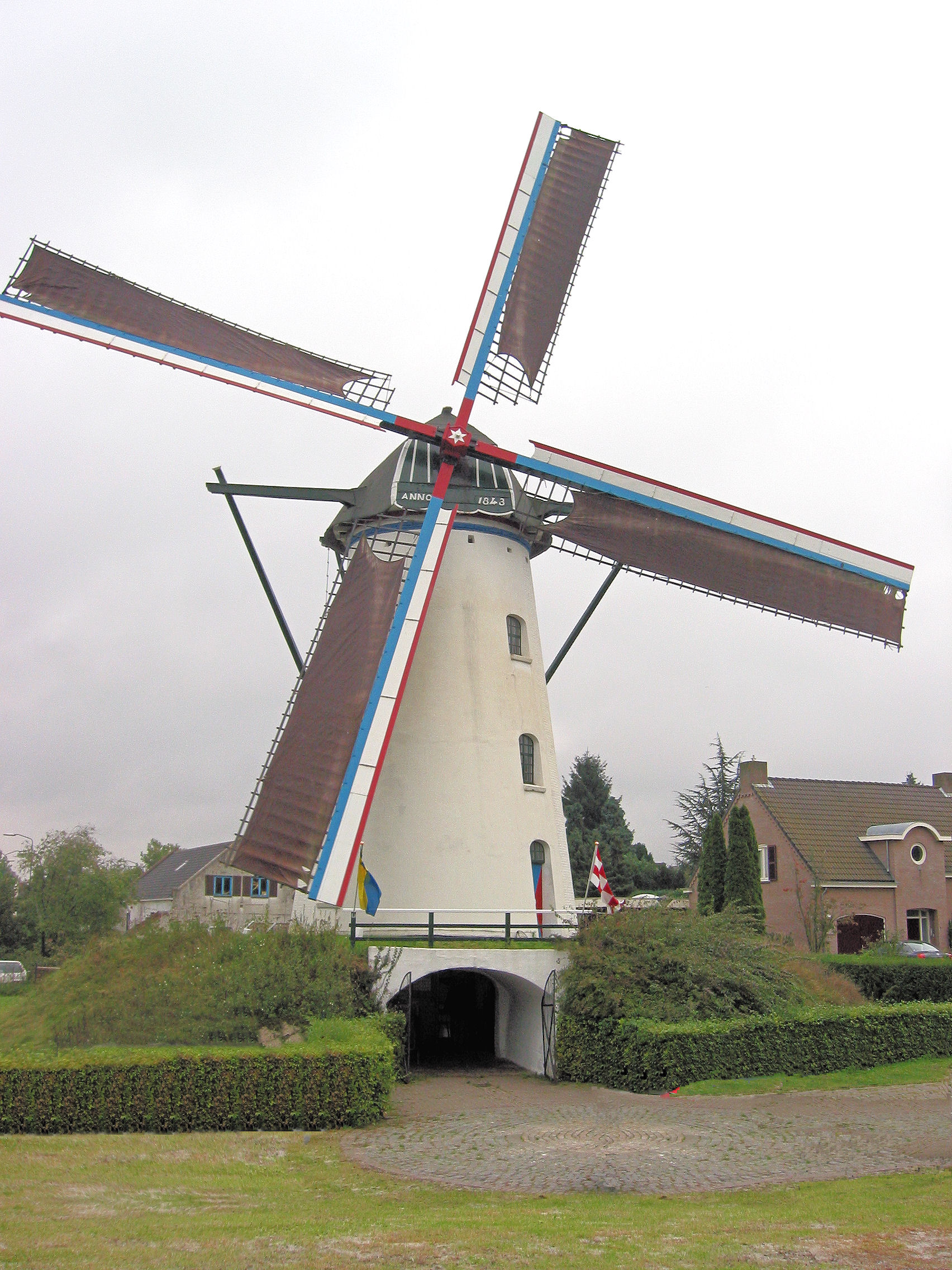
- 't Nupke in 2007
- Interactive map of the 't Nupke area
- Alternative names: De Obbing

General information
- Status: Rijksmonument (16032)
- Type: Windmill
- Location: Molenakker 3; 5664 ET, Geldrop, Geldrop, Netherlands
- Coordinates: 51.416667°N 5.555278°E,
- Completed: 1843

Design and construction
- Designations: Gristmill

References
- Database of Mills; De Hollandsche Molen

't Nupke is a windmill located on Molenakker 3 in Geldrop, North Brabant, Netherlands. Built in 1843 on a hill, the windmill functioned as a gristmill. The mill was built as a tower mill, and its sails have a span of 25.20 metres (82.7 ft). The mill has been a national monument (nr 16032) since 15 May 1968. The name of the mill comes from the piece of land it is located on.

== Etymology ==
The mill was named in the 1970s after the piece of land the mill was built on, which was locally called Het Nupke. 't is short for het which is Dutch for the article "the". Nupke is a Brabantian dialect word for "button" or "bump", indicating there was a small hill at this location.

== History ==
't Nupke was built by miller Anthonij Sevens and was completed in 1843. Before building the mill Sevens was miller, in cooperation with Dirk Verbeek, at the watermill in Geldrop and the windmill in Zesgehuchten. For unknown reason he broke this cooperation in 1841 and started the work to build 't Nupke. After he died in 1849 his son Anthonius took over. Theodorus Verbeek bought the mill in 1870, and was succeeded by his sons who would work the mill until it was sold to Paulus Joseph Rooymans in 1920.

In 1933 Johannes Bernardus Obbing bought the mill, which gave the mill its nickname De Obbing. At his passing in 1967 the mill was inherited by his daughters. The mill would not be used for the next 10 years and came into disrepair. Having been declared a national monument on 15 May 1968, the mill was bought by the municipality of Geldrop in 1978 and restored.

On 10 May 1980, National Mills Day, the mill was officially taken into use again by volunteer millers.

== Description ==
Round stone mill covered in white plaster.

== Location ==
't Nupke is on a small elevation, on the west end of a dead end street, Molenakker, south west of the center of Geldrop.

== Owners ==
The mill has had the following owners.

- Anthonij Sevens (1843-1849)
- Anthonius Sevens (1849-1870)
- Theodorus Verbeek and sons (1870-1920)
- Paulus Joseph Rooymans (1920-1933)
- Johannes Bernardus Obbing and daughters (1933-1967, 1967–1978)
- Municipality of Geldrop / Mill trust Geldrop-Mierlo (1978–present)

== Gallery of images ==
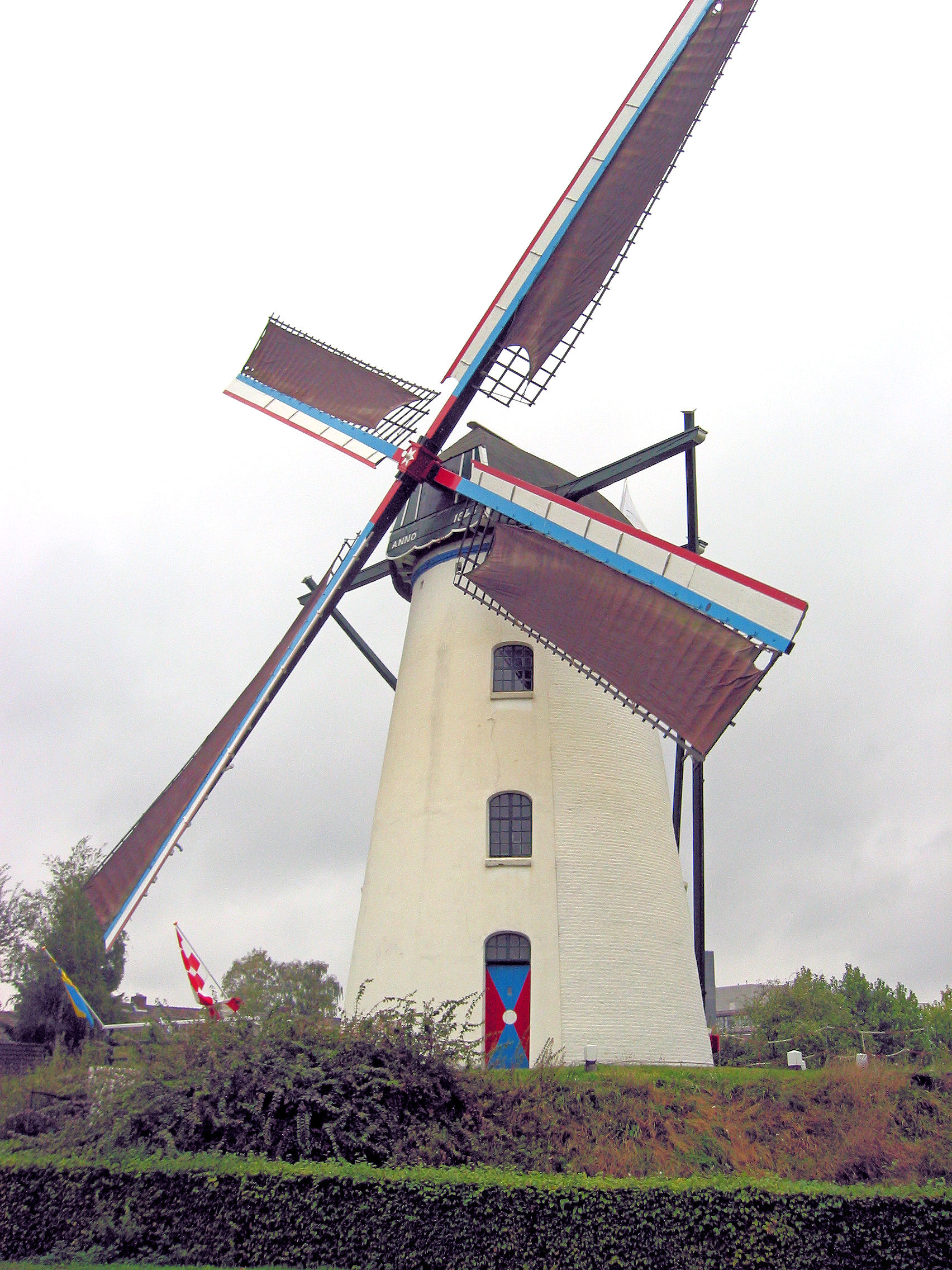
The mill is built on a hill

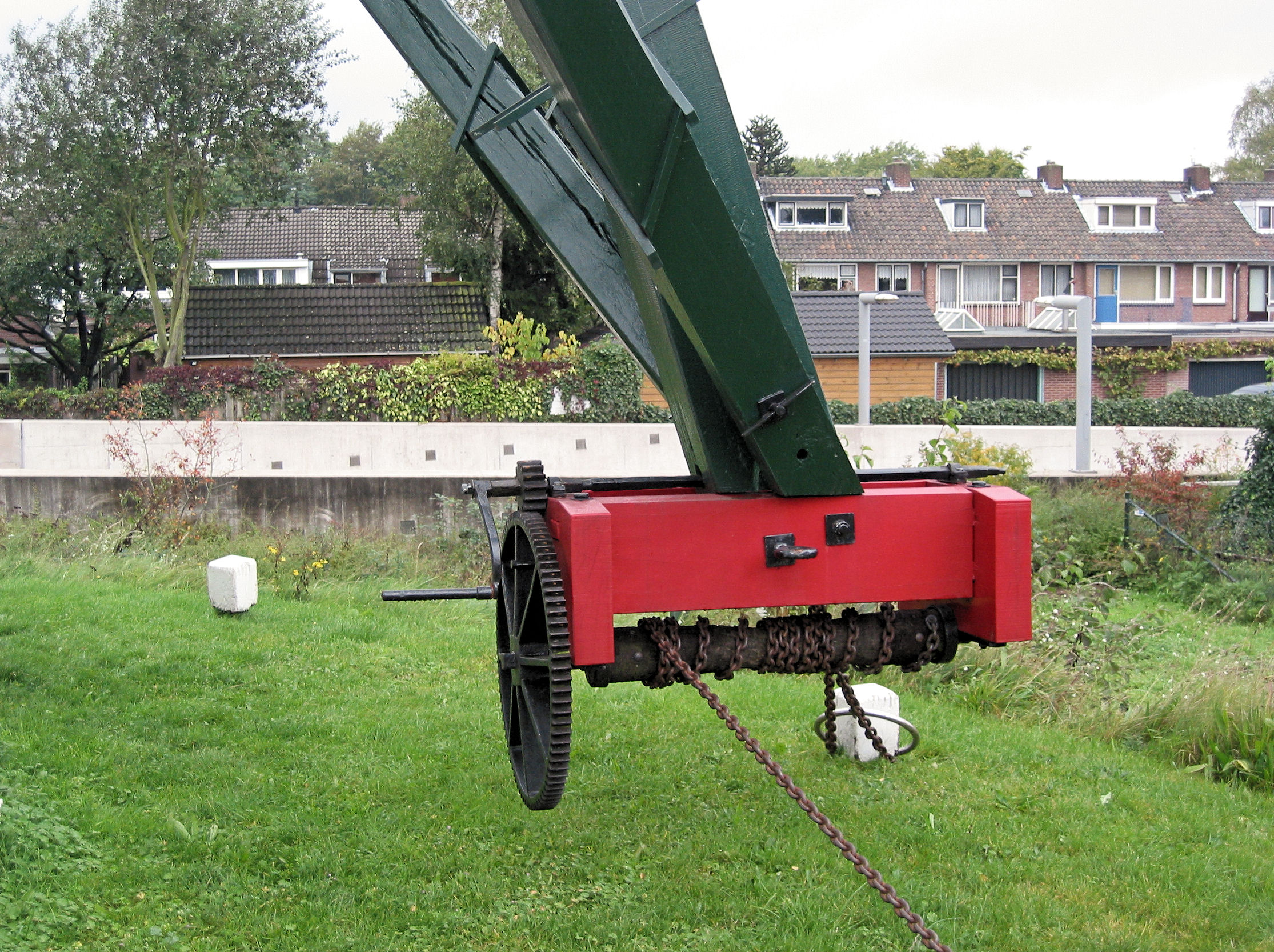
Close up of the wheel to turn the sails (Dutch: Kruilier)

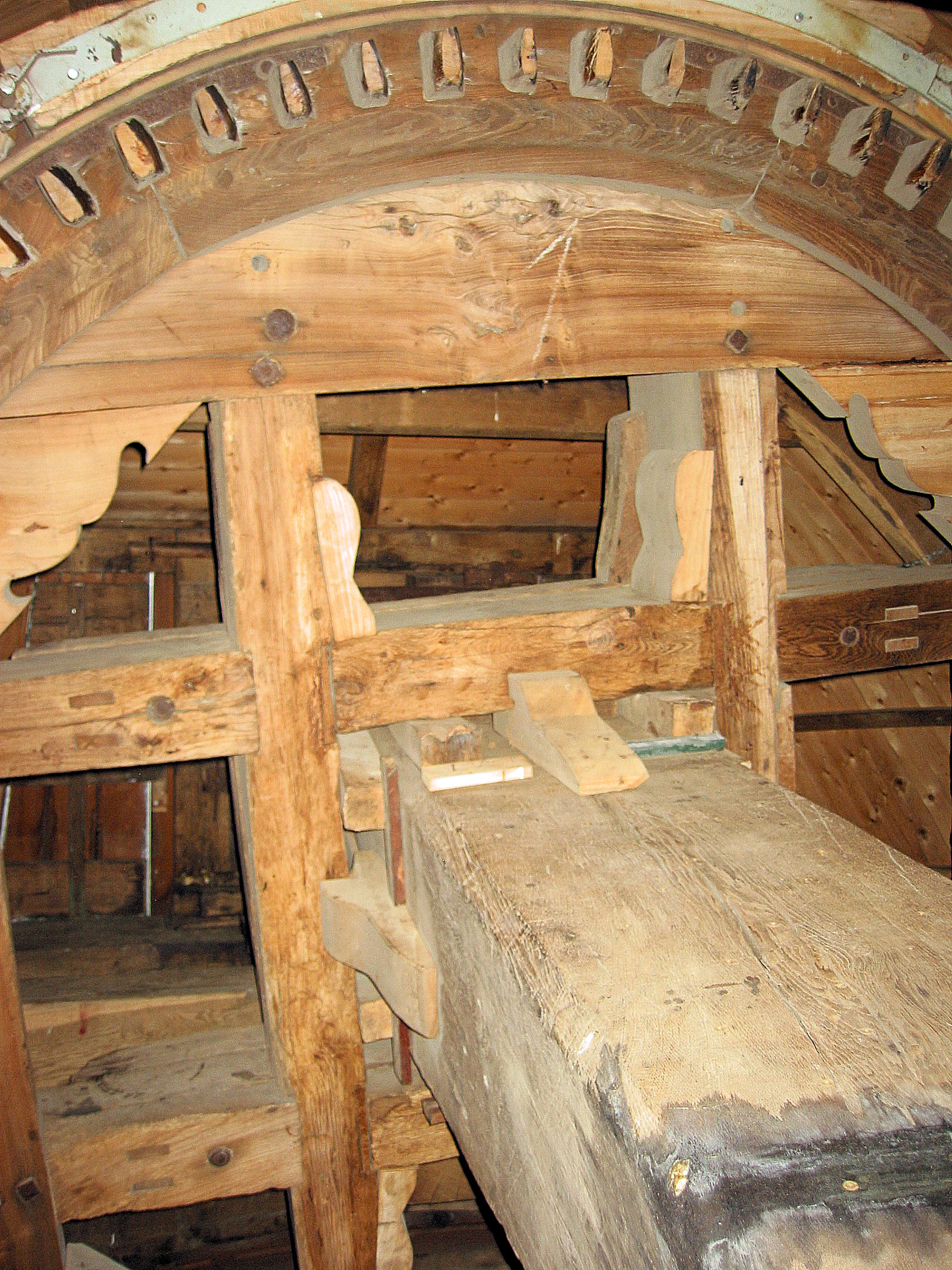
Wooden upper shaft
