= Albertdina, Noord-Sleen =

Windmill in Noord-Sleen, Netherlands

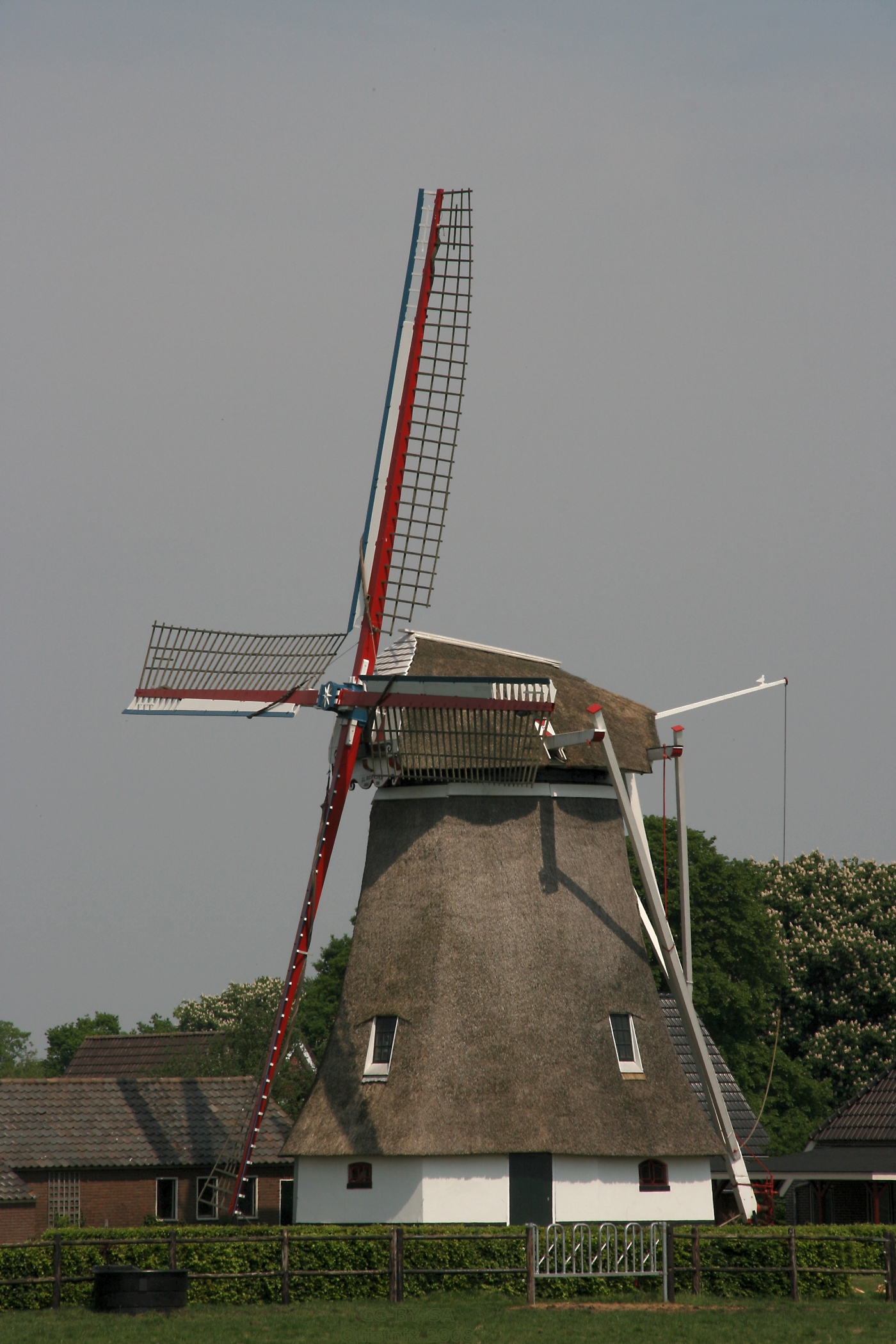
- Albertdina, May 2009
- Interactive map of Albertdina, Noord-Sleen

Origin
- Mill name: Albertdina
- Mill location: Markeweg 30, 7846 AH, Noord-Sleen
- Coordinates: 52°47′17″N 6°48′09″E
- Operator: Gemeente Coevorden
- Year built: 1906

Information
- Purpose: Corn mill
- Type: Smock mill
- Storeys: Three-storey smock
- Base storeys: One-storey base
- Smock sides: Eight sides
- No. of sails: Four sails
- Type of sails: Common sails
- Windshaft: Cast iron
- Winding: Tailpole and winch
- No. of pairs of millstones: One pair
- Size of millstones: 1.40 metres (4 ft 7 in) diameter

Albertdina is a smock mill in Noord-Sleen, Netherlands. It was built in 1906 and is listed as a Rijksmonument, number 33783.

== History ==
The windmill Concordia stood on this site from 1904 until it was burnt down in 1906. It had originally been built in Damsterdiep, Groningen in 1771 and moved to Noord-Sleen in 1904 To replace it, the 1851-built corn mill Molen van Grashuis was moved from Usquert, Groningen, to Noord-Sleen by millwright H Wiertsma of Scheemda, Groningen. The first miller was Mr Westerling. Nine windmills that he worked burnt down. Westerling took a mill at 't Haantje in 1909 and Albertdina was bought by J Ziengs. The mill was restored in 1953 by millwright Christiaan Bremer of Adorp, Groningen. Since 1976 the mill has been owned by the local council. During the 1970s, the mill had a pair of Patent sails and a pair of Common sails, but it now has four Common sails. The sails have been shortened due to a nearby building.

== Description ==
Albertdina is what the Dutch describe as an "achtkante grondzeiler". It is a three-storey smock mill on a single-storey brick base. There is no stage, the sails reaching almost to the ground. The smock and cap are thatched. The mill is winded by a tailpole and winch. The four Common sails have a span of 22.00 metres (72 ft 2 in) are carried in a cast-iron windshaft, which was cast by Prins van Oranje, The Hague in 1906. The windshaft also carries the brake wheel, which has 65 cogs. The brake wheel drives the wallower (35 cogs) at the top of the upright shaft. At the bottom of the upright shaft the great spur wheel, which has 102 cogs, drives the 1.40 metres (4 ft 7 in) diameter French Burr millstones via lantern pinion stone nut which has 27 staves.

== Millers ==
- Westerling 1906–09
- J Ziengs 1909–

Reference for above:-

== Public access ==
Albertdina is open by appointment, or when a blue flag is flying. It is open on the Dutch National Mills Day and Open Monument Day.
