= Noord-Sleen =

- Village
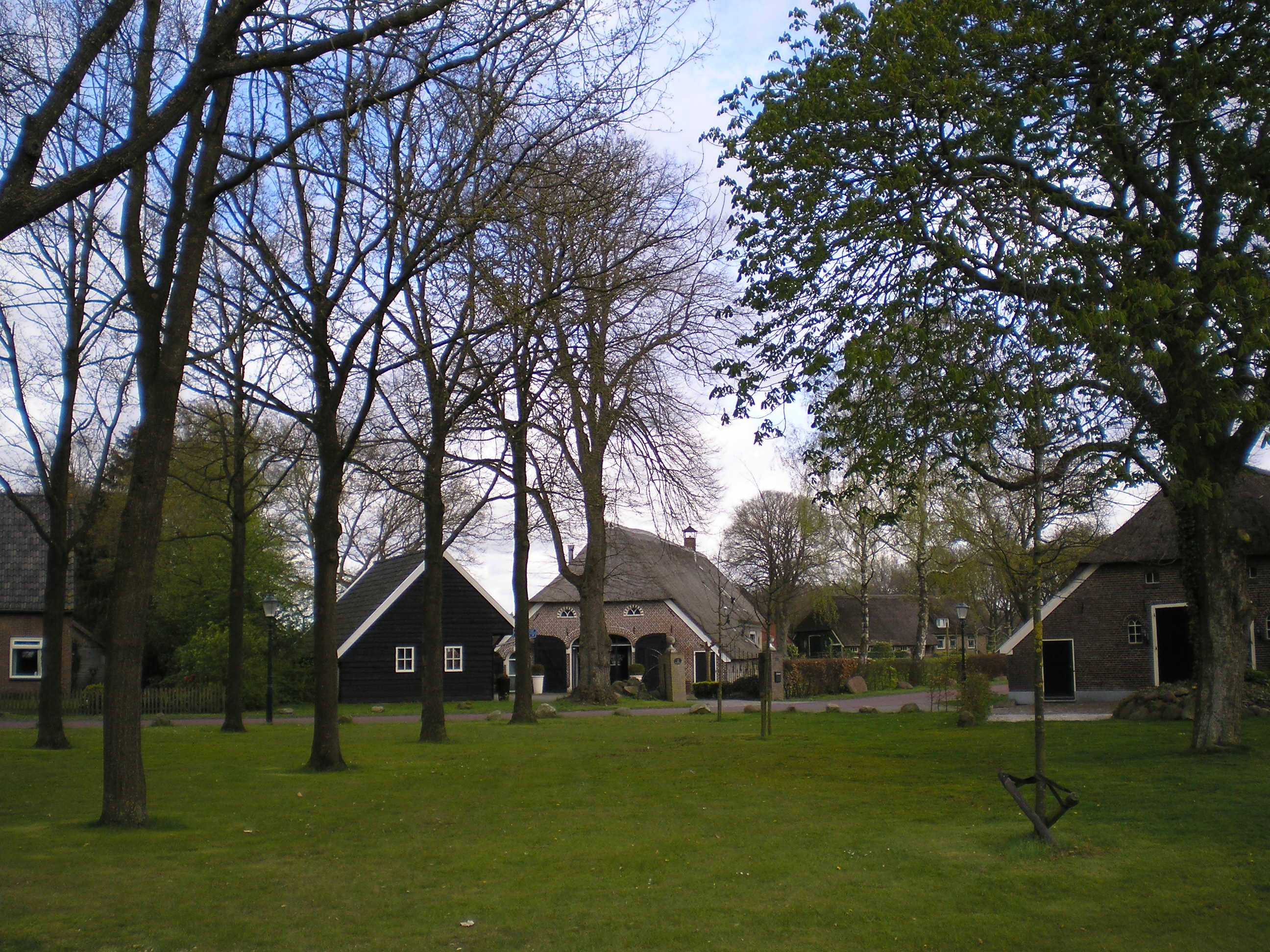
- Village green in Noord-Sleen

- Location within Drenthe Location within Netherlands
- Coordinates: 52°47′30″N 6°48′6″E
- Country: Netherlands
- Province: Drenthe
- Municipality: Coevorden

Area
  - Total: 12.10 km^{2} (4.67 sq mi)
- Elevation: 19 m (62 ft)

Population (2021)
  - Total: 585
  - Density: 48.3/km^{2} (125/sq mi)
- Time zone: UTC+1 (CET)
  - Summer (DST): UTC+2 (CEST)
- Postal code: 7846
- Dialing code: 0591

Noord-Sleen (formerly: Noordsleen, Drèents: Noord-Slien) is a village in the municipality of Coevorden in the province of Drenthe, Northeastern Netherlands.

Noord-Sleen started as an esdorp which split from Sleen in the 9th century. It contains two village greens. It was first mentioned in 1365 as van Nortslene. In 1840, it was home to 350 people. The gristmill Albertdina was moved to Noord-Sleen in 1905.

There are two dolmen near Noord-Sleen. D50 is a large dolmen with a near complete ring of 24 stones. 7 of the 8 capstones are still present. D51 is not in a good condition, and it is clear that the capstones have been removed.

== Gallery ==
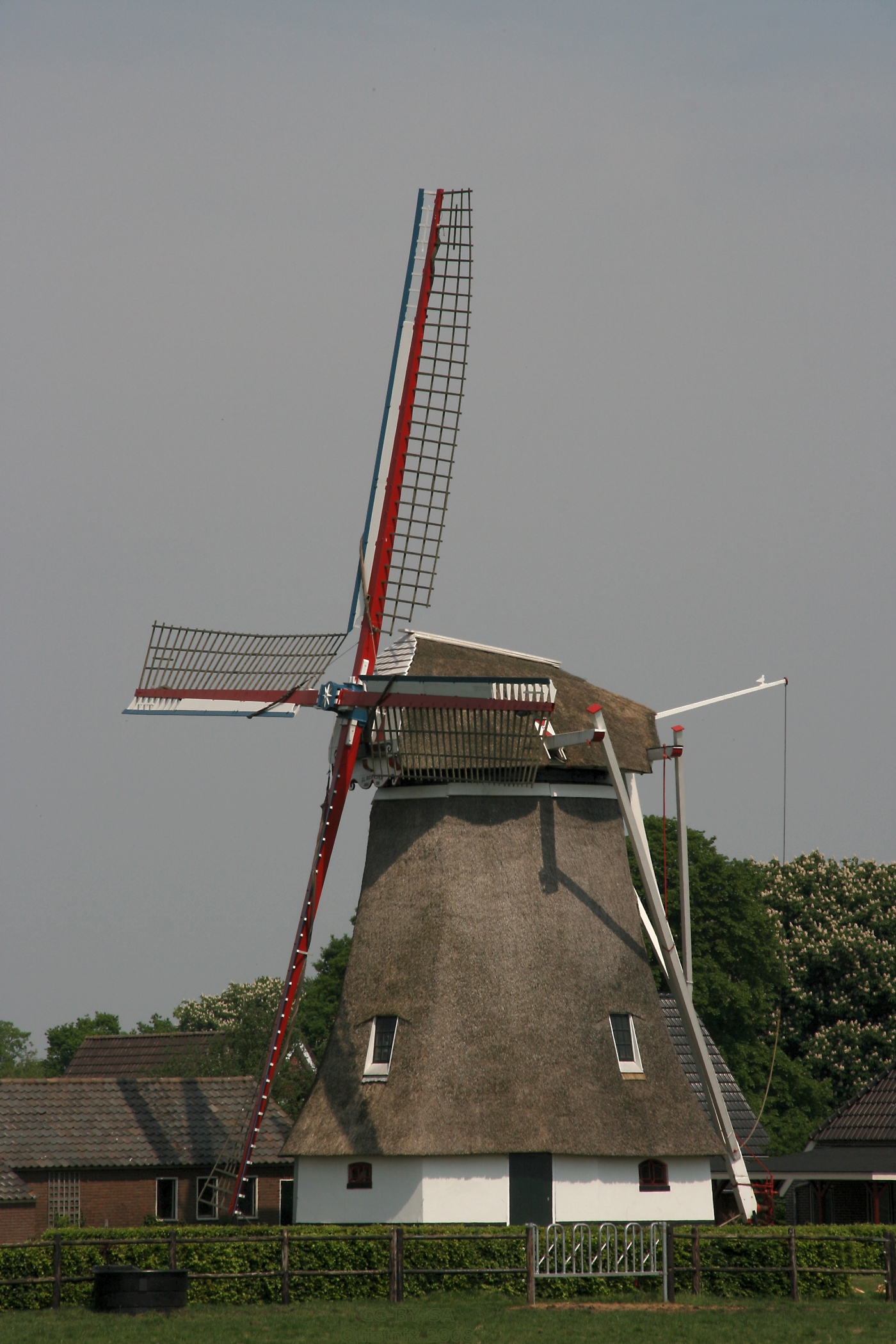
Windmill Albertdina

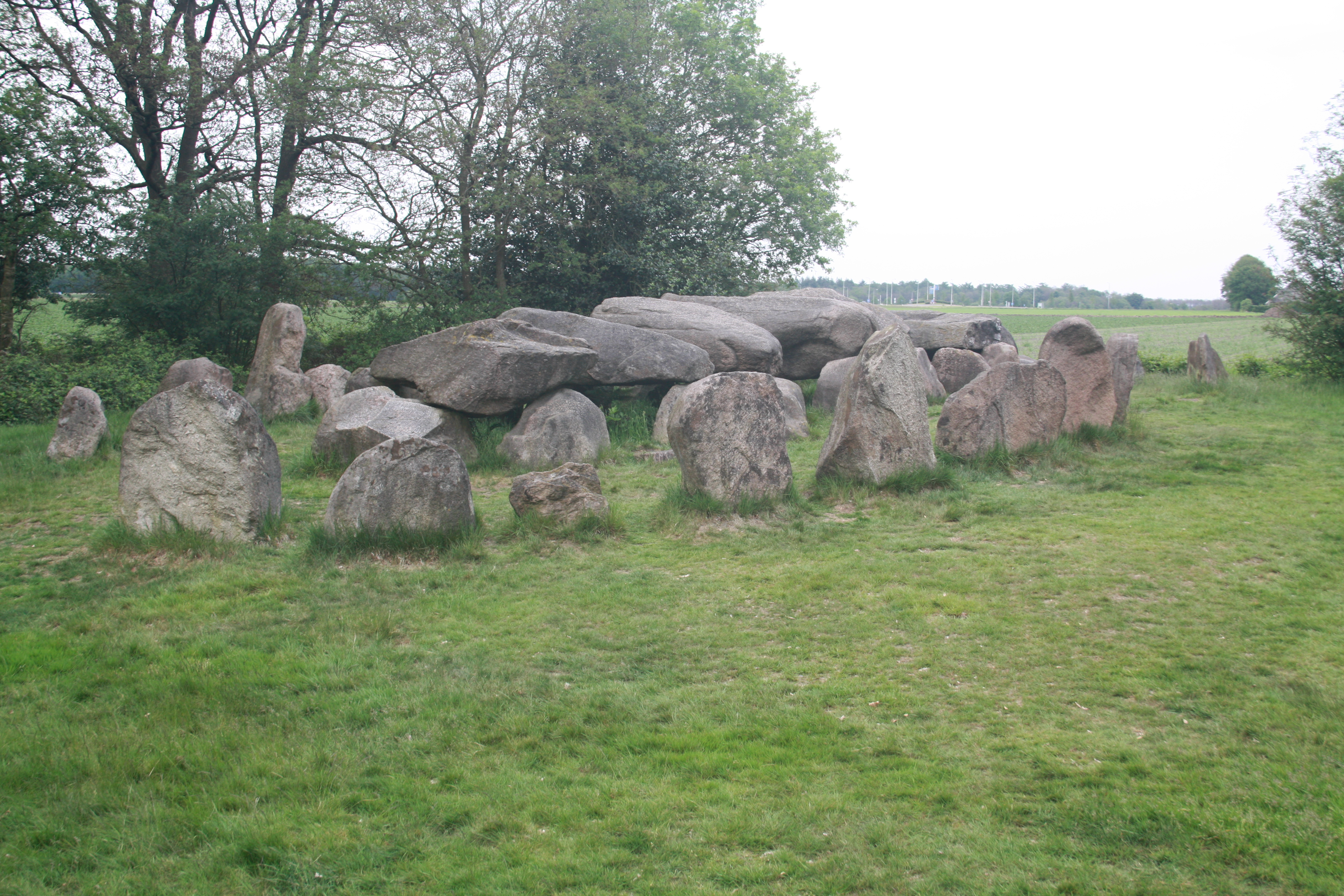
Dolmen D50
