= List of windmills in Utrecht =

List of Dutch windmills

A list of windmills in the Dutch province of Utrecht.

Location	Name of mill	Type	Built	Notes	Photograph
Abcoude	De Broekzijde Molen	Grondzeiler	1641	Molendatabase (in Dutch)	
Abcoude	Oostzijdse Molen; Delphine	Grondzeiler	1874	Molendatabase (in Dutch)	
Amersfoort	Molen van Nefkens; De Gunst	Achtkantmolen		Moved to Sleen, Drenthe in 1914. Molendatabase (in Dutch); De Hollandsche Molen (in Dutch)	
Baambrugge	Hoog en Groenland	Grondzeiler	c1680	Molendatabase (in Dutch)	
Breukelen	Kortrijkse Molen	Wipmolen	1696	Molendatabase (in Dutch)	
Bunschoten	De Hoop	Stellingmolen	2008	Molendatabase (in Dutch)	
Cabauw	De Middelse Molen; Tweede Molen	Wipmolen	1773	Molendatabase (in Dutch)	
Cothen	Oog in 't Zeil	Stellingmolen	1869	Molendatabase (in Dutch)	
Elst	't Wissel	Grondzeiler	1855	Molendatabase (in Dutch)	
Groenekan	Geesina	Stellingmolen	1843	Molendatabase (in Dutch)	
Hei- en Boeicop	Hoekmolen	Wipmolen		Molendatabase (in Dutch)	
IJsselstein	De Windotter	Stellingmolen	1732	Molendatabase (in Dutch)	
Kockengen	Kockengense Molen	Wipmolen	1675	Molendatabase (in Dutch)	
Kockengen	Spengense Molen	Wipmolen	1841	Molendatabase (in Dutch)	
Leerdam	Ter Leide	Wipmolen		Molendatabase (in Dutch)	
Lexmond	Vlietmolen	Wipmolen		Molendatabase (in Dutch)	
Loenen aan de Vecht	De Hoop	Stellingmolen	1901	Molendatabase (in Dutch)	
Loenen aan de Vecht	Loenderveense Molen	Grondzeiler	1652	Molendatabase (in Dutch)	
Montfoort	De Valk	Stellingmolen	1753	Molendatabase (in Dutch)	
Nieuwegein	Oudegeinse Molen	Wipmolen	2003	Molendatabase (in Dutch)	
Nieuwersluis	Oukoper Molen	Wipmolen	1644	Molendatabase (in Dutch)	
Nigtevecht	Garstenmolen	Grondzeiler	1876	Molendatabase (in Dutch)	
Oud-Zuilen	Buitenwegse Molen	Wipmolen	1830	Molendatabase (in Dutch)	
Oud-Zuilen	Westbroekse Molen	Grondzeiler	1753	Molendatabase (in Dutch)	
Rhenen	Binnenmolen	Stellingmolen	1970	Molendatabase (in Dutch)	
Soest	De Windhond	Stellingmolen	2008	Molendatabase (in Dutch)	
Tienhoven, Stichtse Vecht	De Trouwe Wachter	Wipmolen	1832	Molendatabase (in Dutch)	
Utrecht	De Ster	Stellingmolen	1999	Molendatabase (in Dutch)	
Utrecht	Rijn en Zon	Stellingmolen	1912	Molendatabase (in Dutch)	
Veenendaal	De Nieuwe Molen	Stellingmolen	1911	Molendatabase (in Dutch)	
Veenendaal	De Vriendschap	Stellingmolen	1872	Molendatabase (in Dutch)	
Vreeland	De Ruiter	Stellingmolen	1910	Molendatabase (in Dutch)	
Vreeland	Hoekermolen	Grondzeiler	1874	Molendatabase (in Dutch)	
Werkhoven	Rijn en Weert	Stellingmolen	1882	Molendatabase (in Dutch)	
Westbroek	De Kraai	Stellingmolen	1880	Molendatabase (in Dutch)	
Wijk bij Duurstede	Rijn en Lek	Stellingmolen	1659	Molendatabase (in Dutch)	
Wilnis	De Veenmolen	Grondzeiler	1823	Molendatabase (in Dutch)	
Woerden	De Windhond	Stellingmolen	1755	Molendatabase (in Dutch)	
