= De Backer =

De Backer may refer to:

- Augustin de Backer (1809–1873), Belgian Jesuit and bibliographer
- Bert De Backer (born 1984), Belgian cyclist
- Jacob de Backer (c. 1555–c. 1591), Flemish Mannerist painter and draughtsman active in Antwerp
- Gotye (born Wouter De Backer in 1980), Australian singer-songwriter
