= De Hoop, Sleen =

Dutch windmill

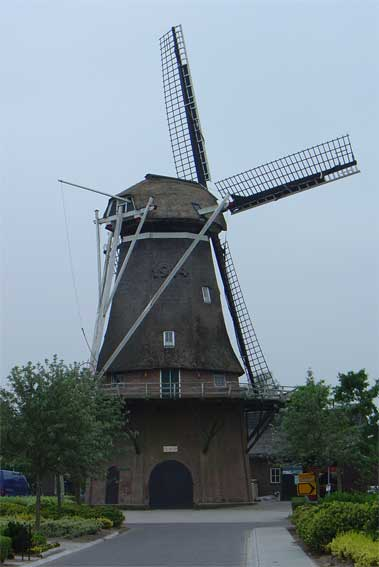
- De Hoop, June 2006

Origin
- Mill name: De Hoop
- Mill location: Drostenstraat 16, 7841 BM Sleen
- Coordinates: 52°46′19″N 6°48′01″E
- Operator(s): Sleener Molen Stichting ‘De Hoop’, owner is Gemeente Coevorden
- Year built: 1914

Information
- Purpose: Corn mill
- Type: Smock mill
- Storeys: Three-storey smock
- Base storeys: Three-storey base
- Smock sides: Eight sides
- No. of sails: Four sails
- Type of sails: Common sails
- Windshaft: Cast iron
- Winding: Tailpole and winch
- No. of pairs of millstones: One pair
- Size of millstones: 1.50 metres (4 ft 11 in)

De Hoop (English: 'The Hope') is a smock mill in Sleen, Drenthe, the Netherlands, which has been restored to working order. The mill was built in 1914 and is listed as a Rijksmonument, number 33787.

== History ==
A mill was built here in 1850. It was a smock mill without a stage and stood until it was burnt down in 1914. To replace it, the mill known as De Gunst, also known as the Molen van Nefkens, was moved from Amersfoort, Utrecht by millwright L Reinds of Beilen. The mill was built for miller H Berends. The mill was restored between 1953 and 1956 by millwright Huberts of Coevorden. On 24 July 1956 the mill was put back to work. In 1976, millwright J D Medendorp of Zuidlaren restored the mill again. In 2010 the local authority Gemeente Coevorden became owner of the mill. Society "Sleener Molen Stichting ‘De Hoop’" was founded in 2012 to work the mill.

== Description ==
De Hoop is what the Dutch describe as an achtkante stellingmolen. It is a three-storey smock mill with a stage on a three-storey brick base. The stage is at second-floor level, 6.30 metres (20 ft 8 in) above the ground. The smock and cap are thatched. The mill is winded by a tailpole and winch. The four Common Sails have a span of 24.62 metres (80 ft 9 in) and are carried in a cast-iron windshaft cast by Enthuizen in 1861. The windshaft also carries the brake wheel, which has 62 cogs. This drives the wallower (30 cogs) at the top of the upright shaft. At the bottom of the upright shaft, the great spur wheel, which has 113 cogs, drives the 1.50-metre (4 ft 11 in)-diameter French Burr stones via a lantern pinion stone nut with 34 staves.

== Millers ==
- H Berends (1914– )

== Public access ==
De Hoop is open to the public whenever a blue flag is flying. The mill is also open on the Drentse Molendag, the last Saturday in August.
