= De Hoop, Almelo =

Dutch windmill

De Hoop
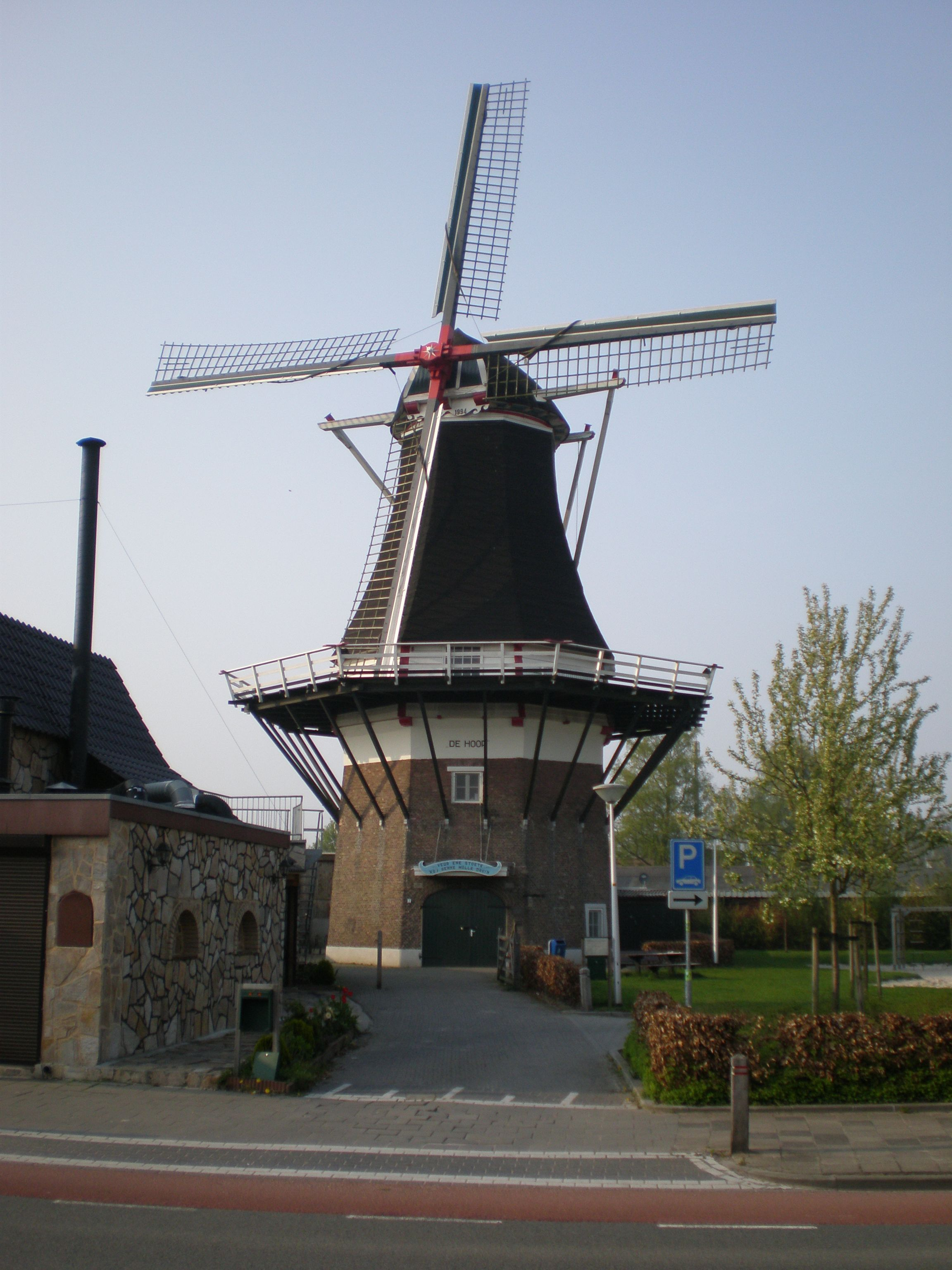
- Interactive map of De Hoop

Origin
- Coordinates: 52.350586°N 6.655806°E
- Operators: Eddy Blenke, Janine van de Linde, Jac Nuitermans, Harold Postma
- Year built: 1843; 183 years ago

De Hoop is a gristmill in Almelo, Netherlands. The mill was built in 1870 with use of a demolished mill from 1797 and was rebuilt after a fire in 1910.
