= De Hoop, Wachtum =

Dutch windmill

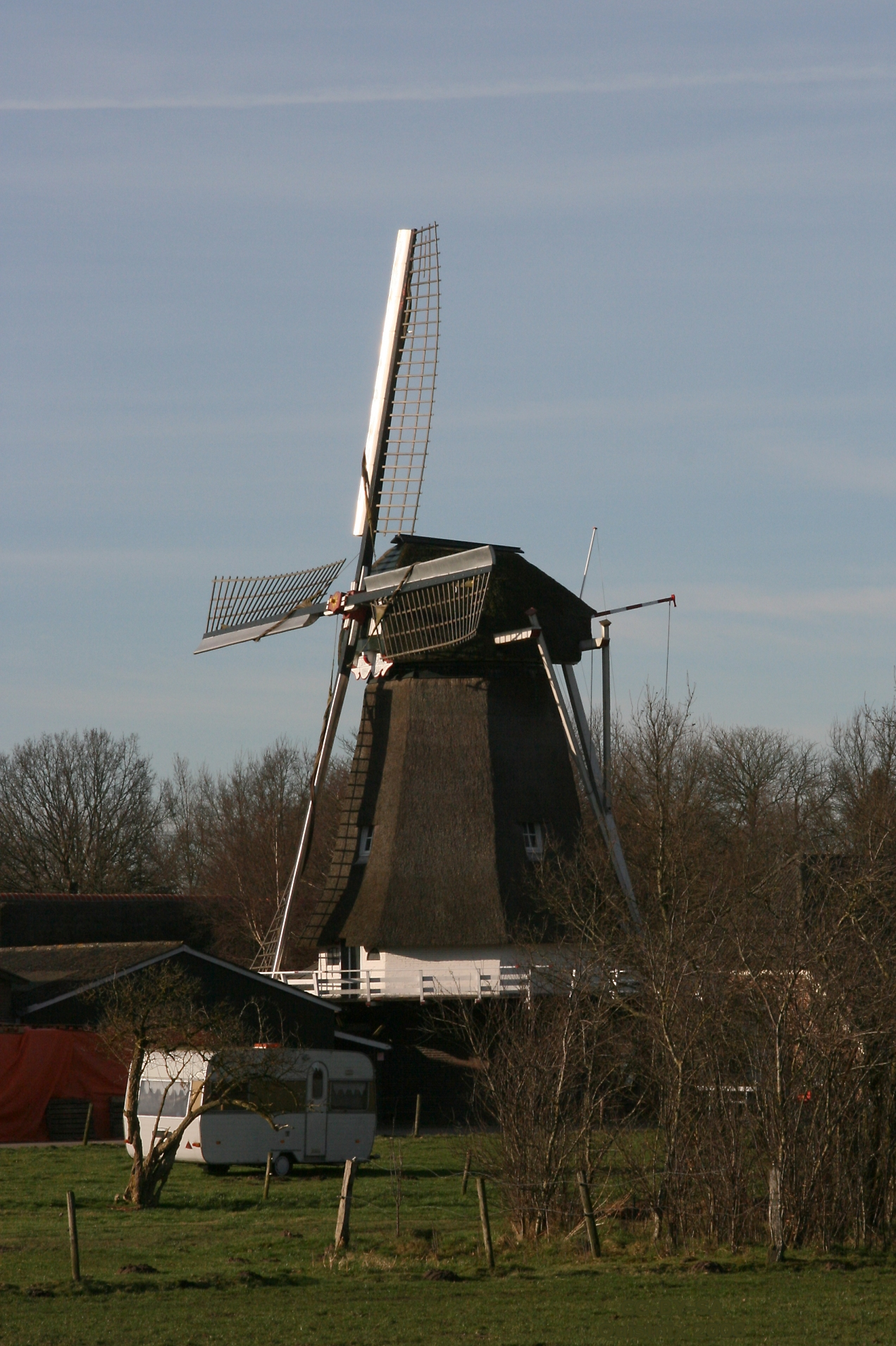
- De Hoop, February 2008

Origin
- Mill name: De Hoop
- Mill location: Middendorp 6, 7754 MB Wachtum
- Coordinates: 52°43′24″N 6°44′50″E
- Operator(s): Stichting Molen De Hoop
- Year built: 1894

Information
- Purpose: Corn mill
- Type: Smock mill
- Storeys: Three-storey smock
- Base storeys: Two-storey base
- Smock sides: Eight sides
- No. of sails: Four sails
- Type of sails: Common sails
- Windshaft: Cast iron
- Winding: Tailpole and winch
- No. of pairs of millstones: Three pairs
- Size of millstones: 1.30 metres (4 ft 3 in)

De Hoop (English: The Hope) is a smock mill in Wachtum, Drenthe, which has been restored to working order. The mill was built in 1894 and is listed as a Rijksmonument, number 11637.

== History ==
De Hoop was originally built at Veendam, Groningen, where it was used as a drainage mill known as Hoop op Beter. It was moved by millwright Rietsma of Haulerwijk, Friesland. In 1937, streamlined leading edges were fitted to the sails although the mill stopped working c1940. The mill was restored in 1968-69 by millwright Huberts of Coevorden and returned to work with Herman Snijders as miller. Snijders died in 1997 and the Stichting Molen De Hoop (English: De Hoop Mill Society) was set up to preserve the mill. A further restoration was undertaken in 2000 by millwright Molema of Heiligerlee, Groningen. A new cap was fitted as well as longer sails and the mill was rethatched. The restored mill was officially opened on 26 August 2000 (the Drentse Molendag) by Mrs Kools, the Deputy Minister for Culture in Drenthe.

== Description ==
De Hoop is what the Dutch describe as an "achtkante stellingmolen". It is a three-storey smock mill with a stage on a two-storey brick base. The stage is at first-floor level, 3.20 metres (10 ft 6 in) above ground level. The smock and cap are thatched. The mill is winded by a tailpole and winch. The four Common sails have a span of 21.20 metres (69 ft 7 in) and are carried in a cast-iron windshaft. The windshaft also carries the brake wheel which has 71 cogs. This drives the wallower (38 cogs) at the top of the upright shaft. At the bottom of the upright shaft, the great spur wheel, which has 97 cogs, drives the 1.30 metres (4 ft 3 in) diameter French Burr stones via a lantern pinion stone nut with 28 staves. The mill formerly drove three pairs of millstones.

== Millers ==
- G J Nijland (1894- )
- Herman Snijders (1969–97)

Reference for above:-

== Public access ==
De Hoop is open to the public daily but only working on Saturdays.
