= De Hoop, Den Hout =

Dutch windmill

De Hoop
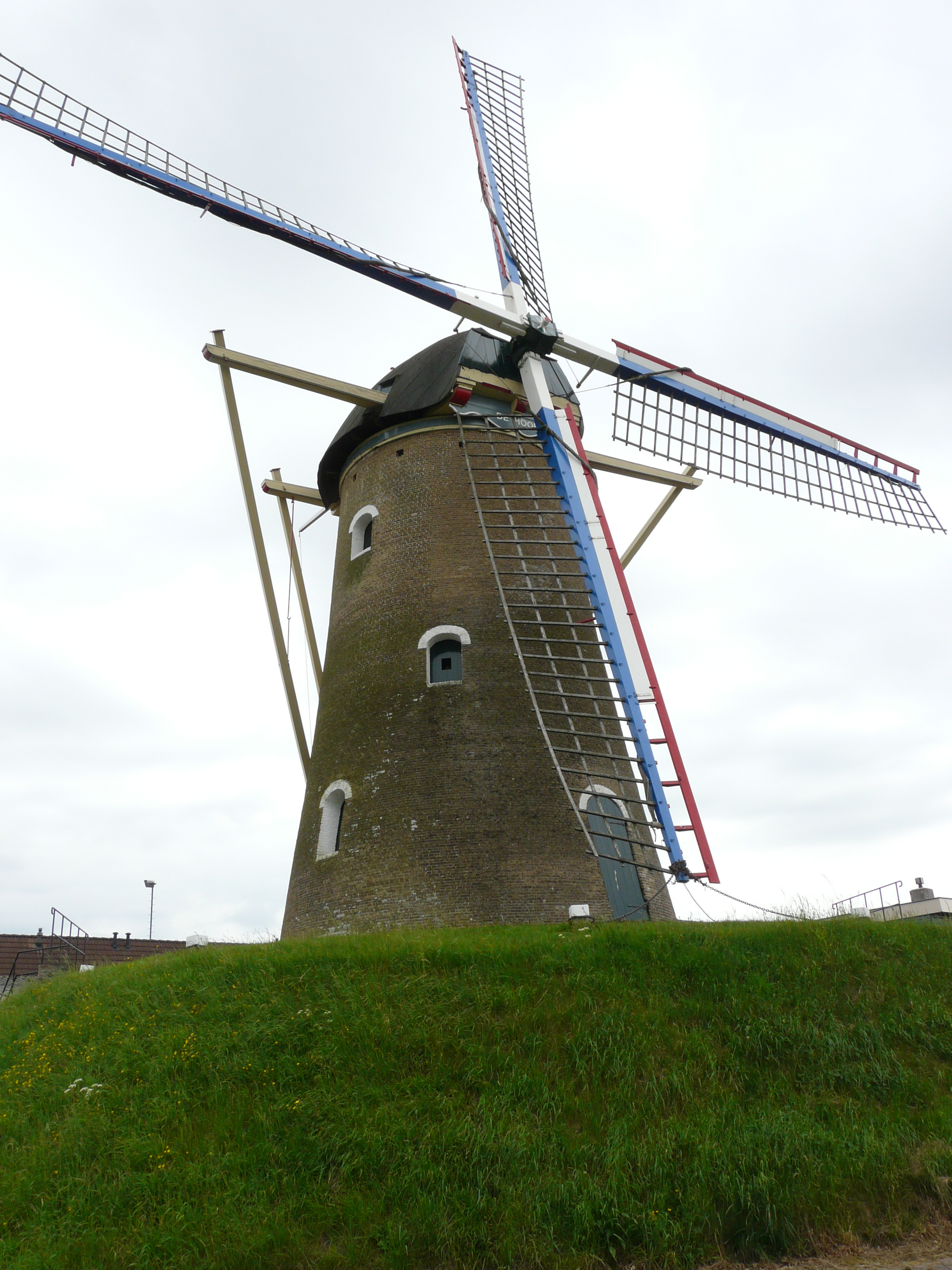

Origin
- Coordinates: 51.656111°N 4.809689°E
- Year built: 1837

De Hoop is a gristmill in Den Hout, Netherlands. The mill was built in 1837. In 1975, the owner sold the mill to the municipality, which had it restored in 1985. It was declared a monument in 1971.
