= De Hoop, Oud-Zevenaar =

Dutch windmill

De Hoop
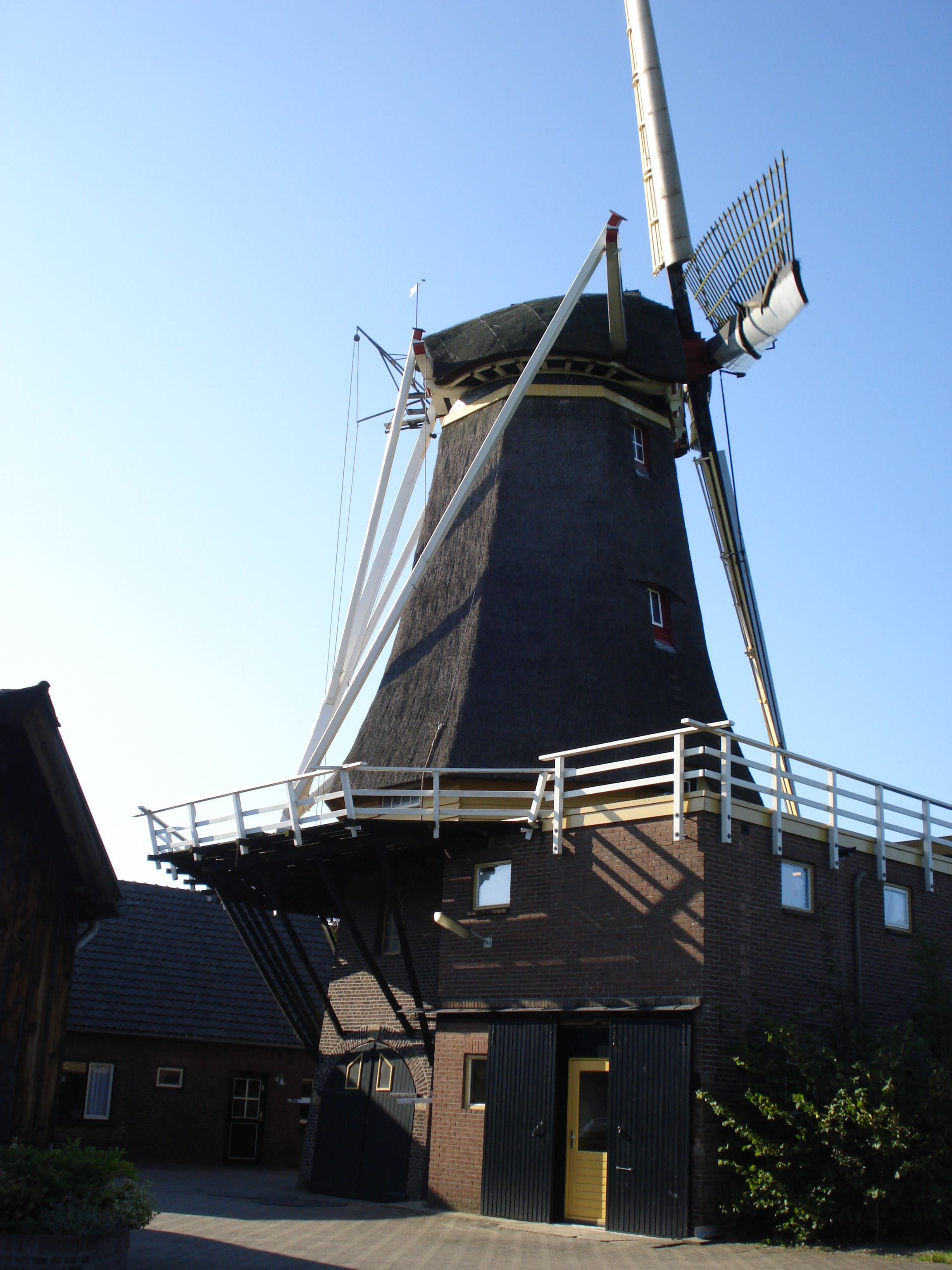
- Interactive map of De Hoop

Origin
- Coordinates: 51.915831°N 6.095058°E
- Year built: 1850

De Hoop is a gristmill in Oud-Zevenaar, Netherlands. It was owned by the Pijnappel family from 1852 until 2014, at which point it was sold to the Botter family. The current miller is Frits Botter.

== History ==
De Hoop was built in 1850 by HB Meyer, who sold it two years later to the Pijnappel family due to the death of his wife. At the time, the Pijnappels also owned windmills in Babberich, Ooy, Duiven, Pannerden, Klarenbeek, and Posterenk. As is customary for mills in the Netherlands, the business as a whole consisted of the mill as well as a bakery in its annex and a farm. At the time, the mill was primarily used to process animal feed, but eventually switched to processing cereals for human consumption under the ownership of Jan Pijnappel. Pijnappel sold the mill to Frits Botter in 2014.
