= De Hoop, Abbenbroek =

Dutch windmill

De Hoop
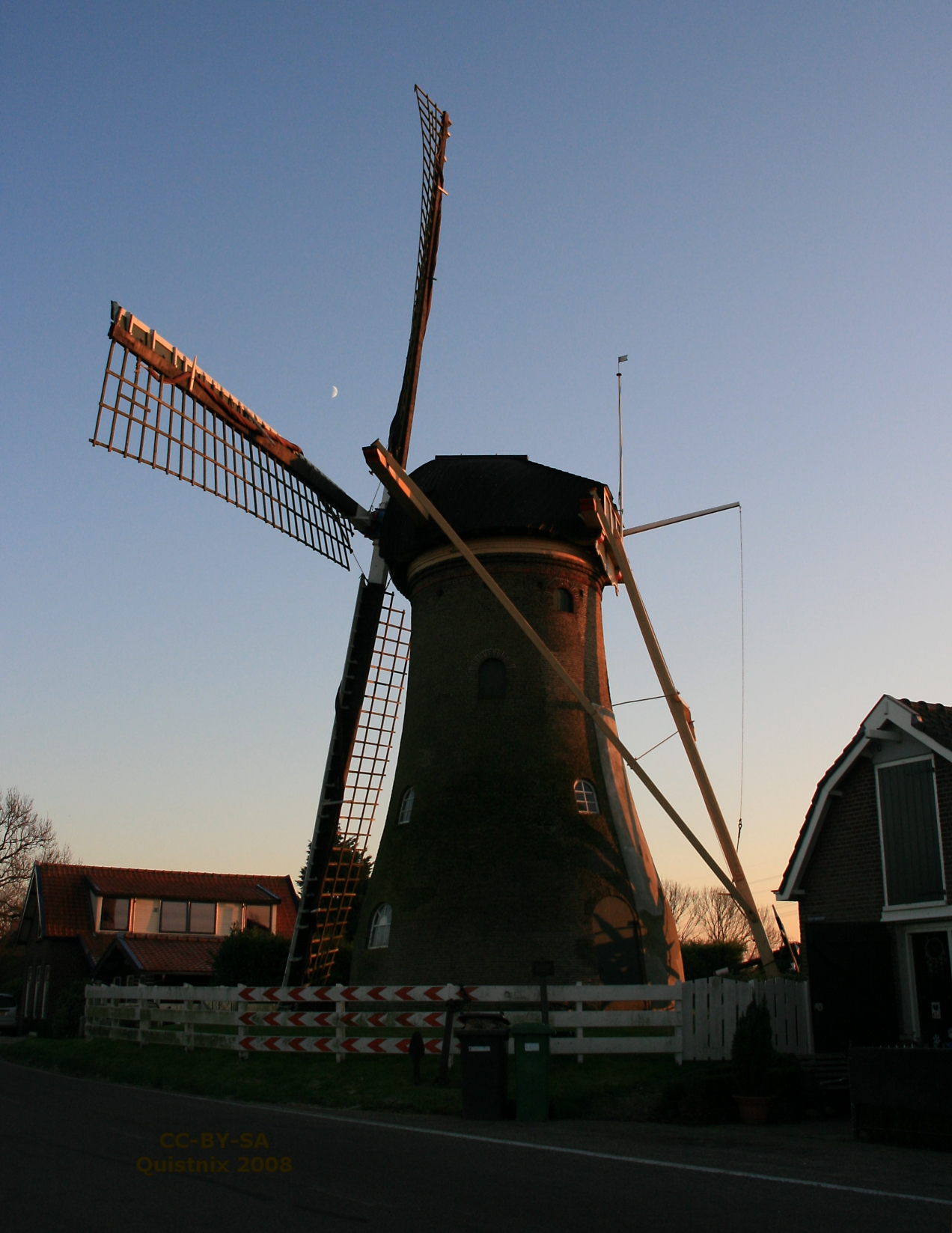

Origin
- Coordinates: 51.847710°N 4.246472°E
- Operator(s): René Kleijn
- Year built: 1843

De Hoop is a gristmill in Abbenbroek, Netherlands. The mill was built in 1843. The mill is a rijksmonument.
