= De Hoop, Den Oever =

Dutch windmill

De Hoop
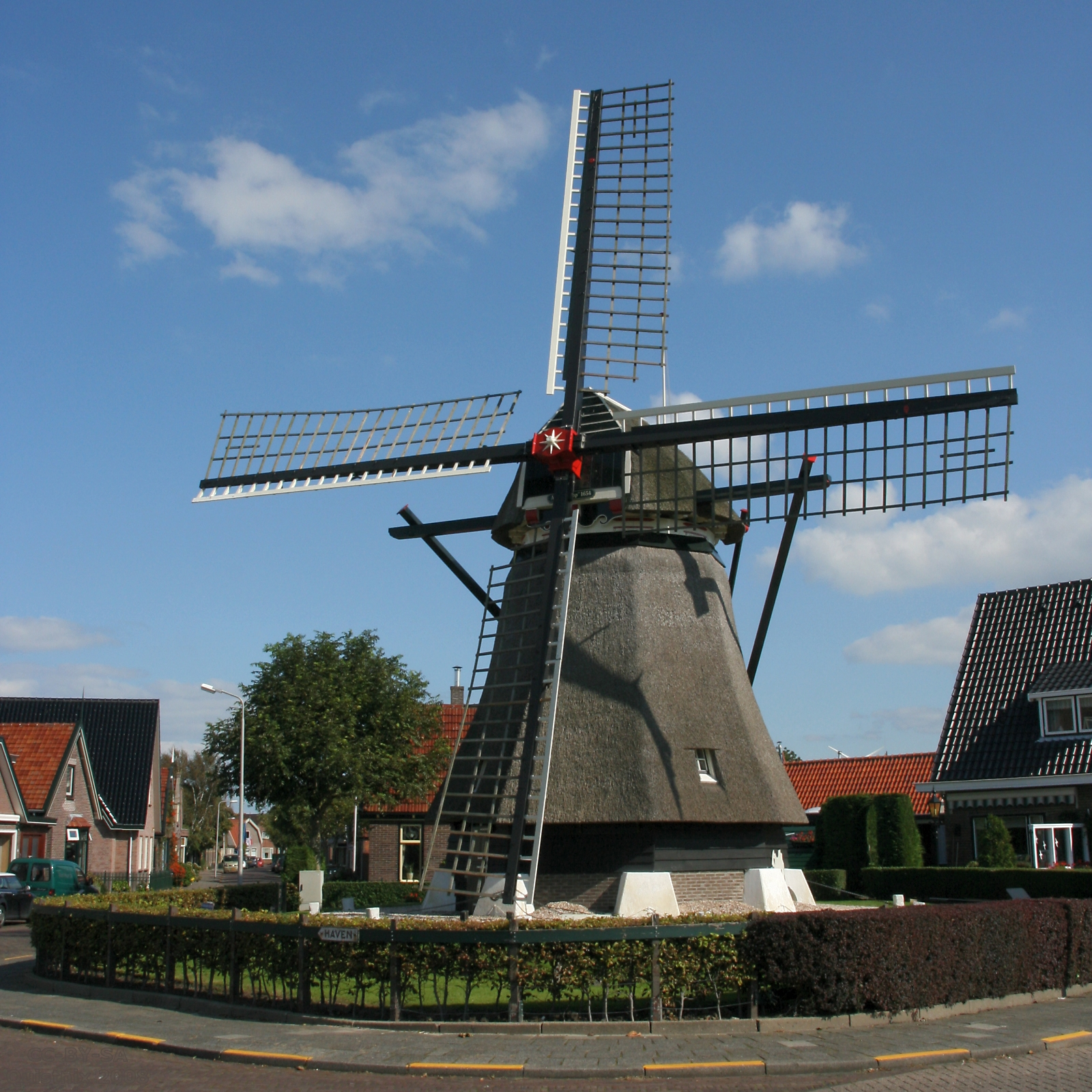

Origin
- Coordinates: 52.934444°N 5.028333°E
- Year built: 1675

De Hoop is a windmill in Den Oever, Netherlands. The mill was built in 1675 as a corn mill and served until the end of the 1930s. In 1952, the Oud-Wieringen De Hoop foundation purchased it in order to preserve it. In 1960 the mill was restored.
