= Den Hout =

- Village
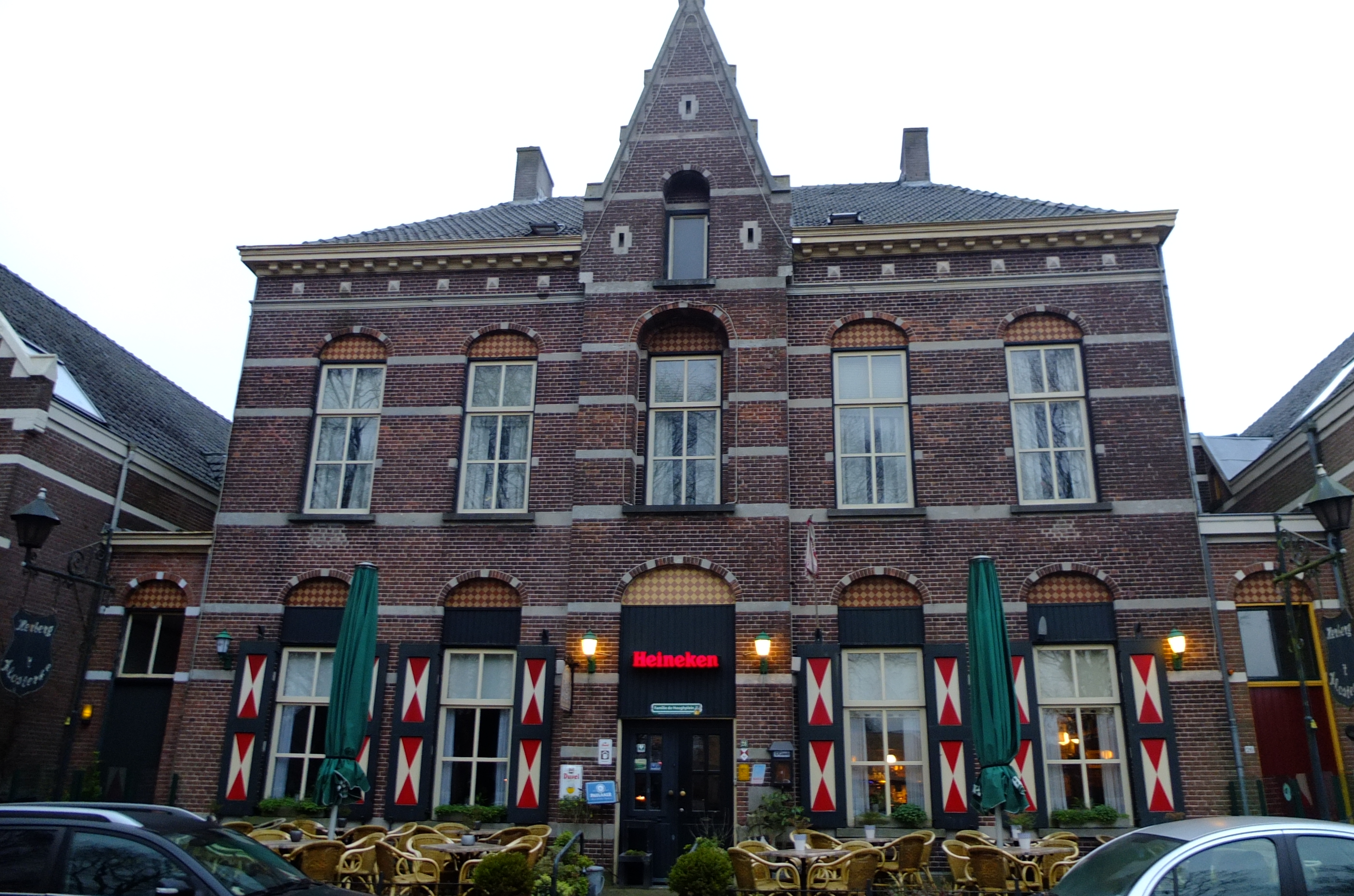
- Inn 't Klosterke

- Location in the province of North Brabant in the Netherlands Den Hout (Netherlands)
- Coordinates: 51°39′28″N 4°48′42″E
- Country: Netherlands
- Province: North Brabant
- Municipality: Oosterhout

Area
  - Total: 7.91 km^{2} (3.05 sq mi)
- Elevation: 2.3 m (7.5 ft)

Population (2021)
  - Total: 1,235
  - Density: 156/km^{2} (404/sq mi)
- Time zone: UTC+1 (CET)
  - Summer (DST): UTC+2 (CEST)
- Postal code: 4911
- Dialing code: 0162

Den Hout is a village in the Dutch province of North Brabant. It is located in the municipality of Oosterhout.

The village was first mentioned in 1311 as "Rolinus dictus van den Houte", and means deciduous forest. The area around Den Hout was settled during Roman times, but abandoned in 273. Den Hout developed in the Middle Ages around a triangular village 'square'.

The St Cornelius Church was built in 1877 and 1878 in Gothic Revival style and as an octagon spire.

Den Hout was home to 650 people in 1840.

== Gallery ==
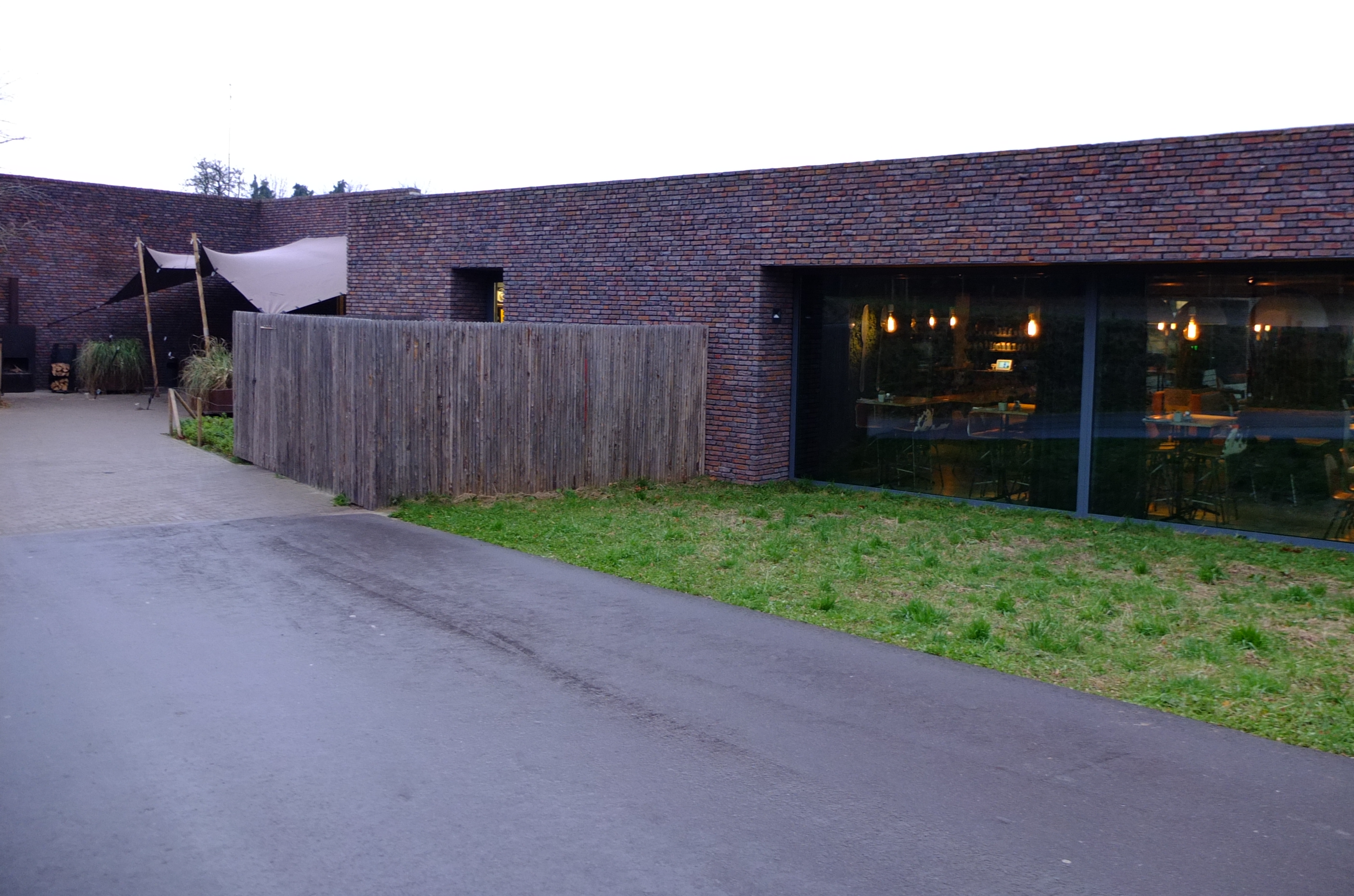
Pavilion Het Houtse Meer

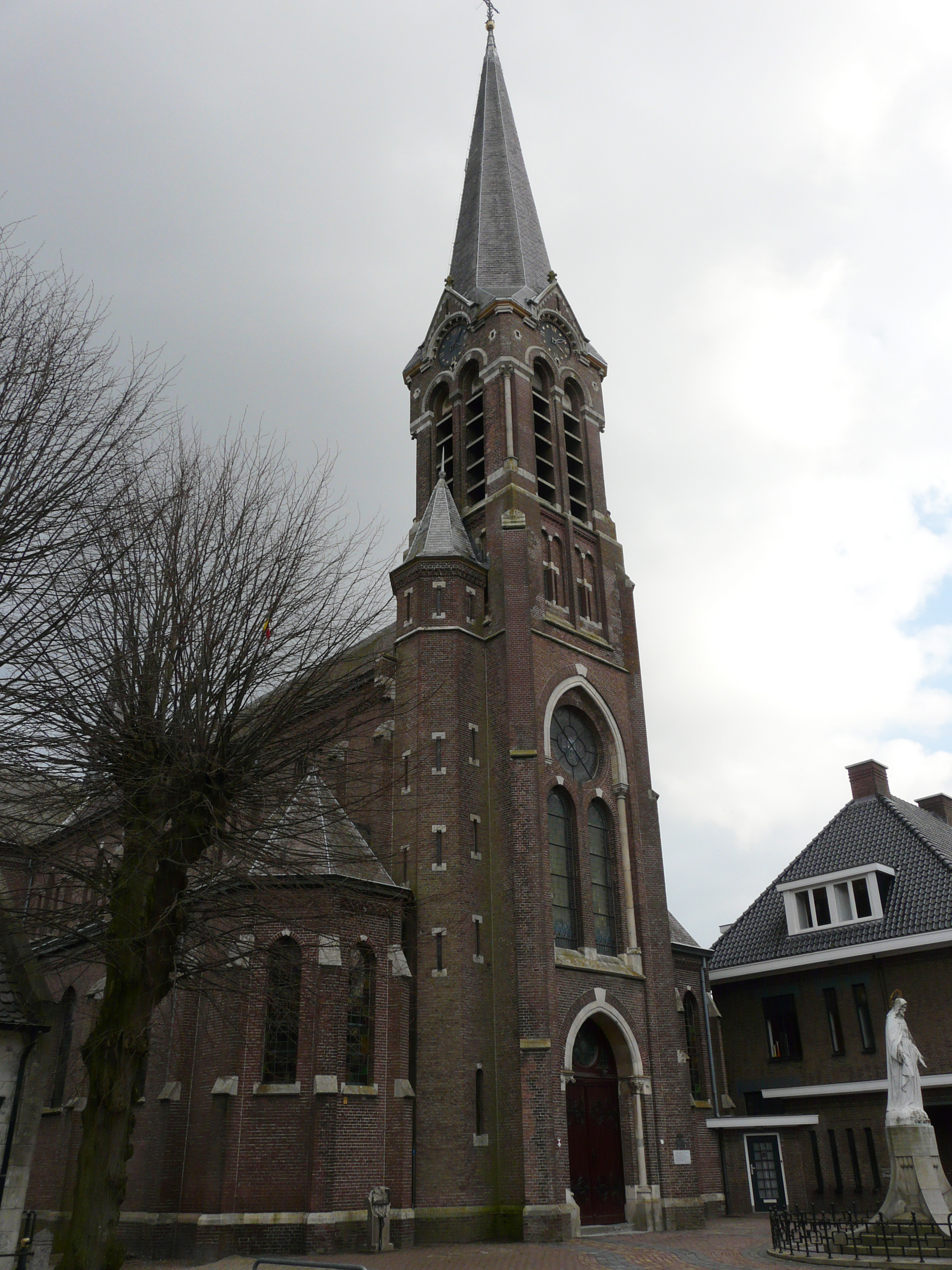
St Cornelius Church

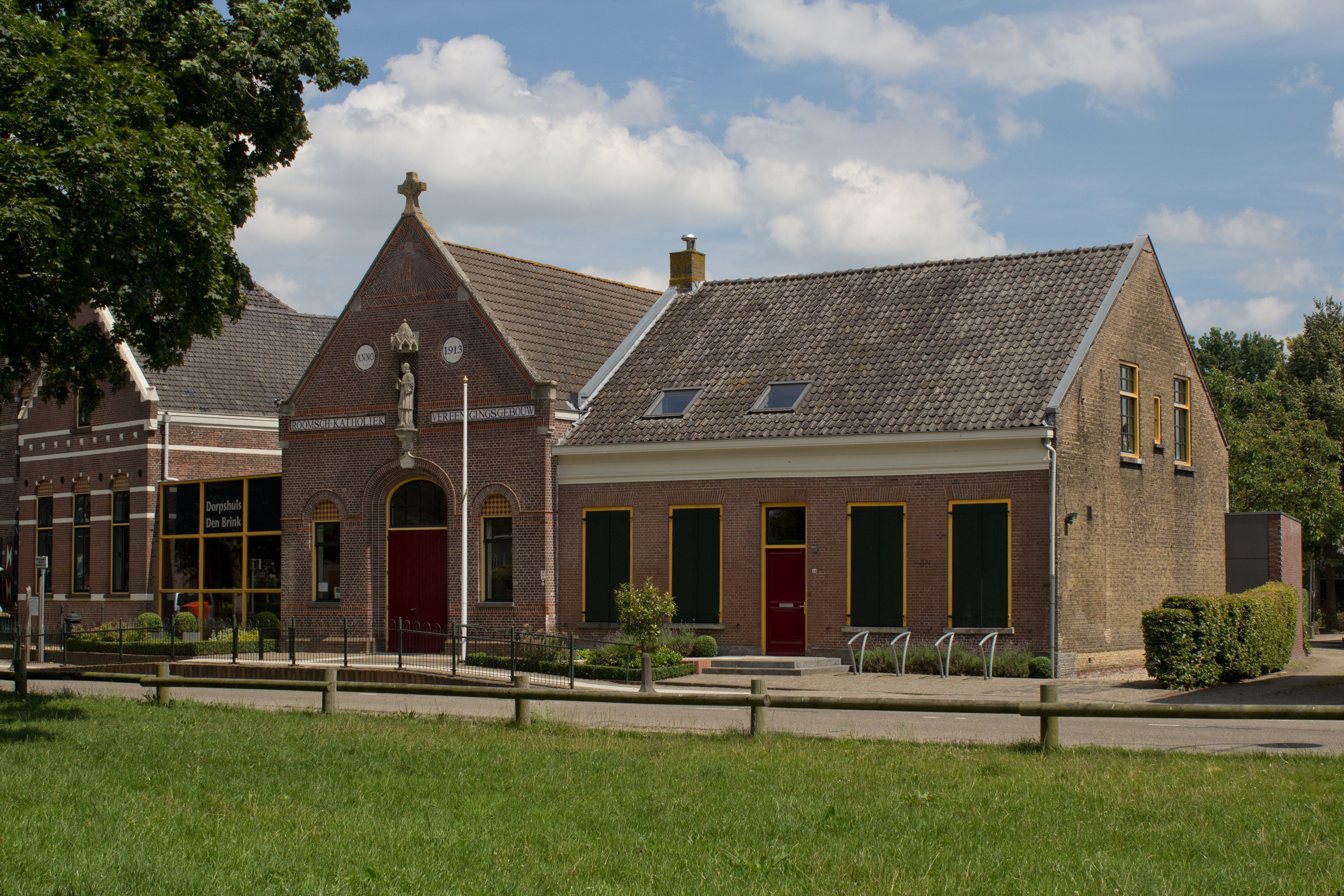
Association building

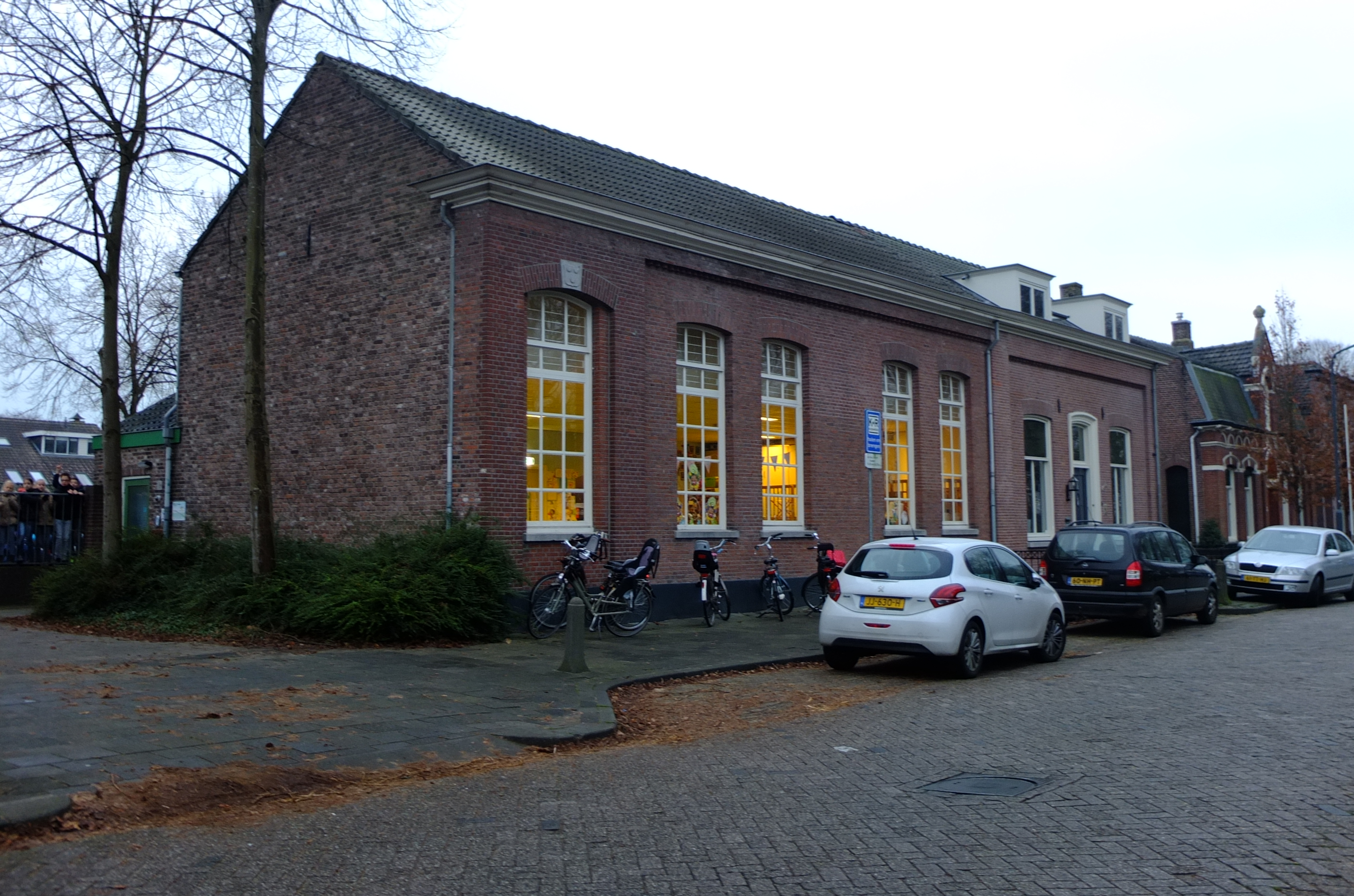
School in Den Hout
