= Zeldenrust, Oss =

Windmill in Oss, Netherlands

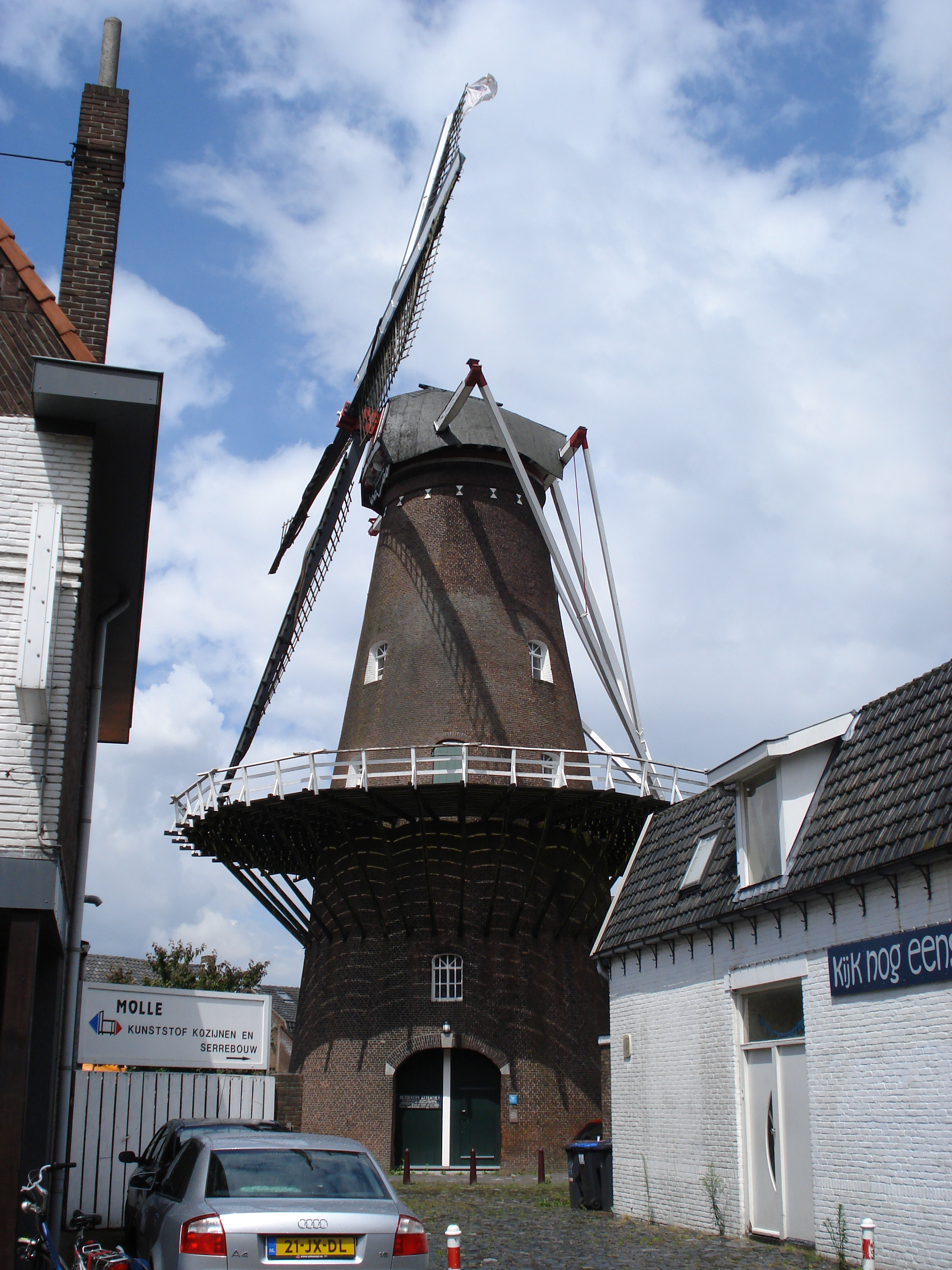
- Zeldenrust, 11 July 2007
- Interactive map of Zeldenrust, Oss

Origin
- Mill name: Zeldenrust / De Zwaluw
- Mill location: Kruisstraat 39, 5341 HA, Oss
- Coordinates: 51°45′56.35″N 5°31′12.65″E
- Operator: Oss Municipality
- Year built: 1860

Information
- Purpose: Flour mill
- Type: Smock mill
- No. of pairs of millstones: Three pair

Zeldenrust (formerly De Zwaluw (English: The swallow)) is a smock mill in Oss, Netherlands.

== History ==
Zeldenrun (known at the time as De Zwaluw) was built in 1860 and was in use up until the end of the 1950s.

It was later sold to the municipality of Oss in 1971. In 1974 De Osse Molen stichting (English: The Oss Mill foundation) was established to raise funds for restoration of the mill. The campaign was successfully funded by 1975 and restoration was completed on 24 February 1978.

== Details ==
Zeldenrun is a round stone smock mill that functions primarily as a flour mill.

The windmill sail is of Old Hollandic design. The mill contains three pairs of millstones.

== Sources ==
- Molendatabase (in Dutch)
