= De Hoop, Bavel =

Dutch windmill

De Hoop
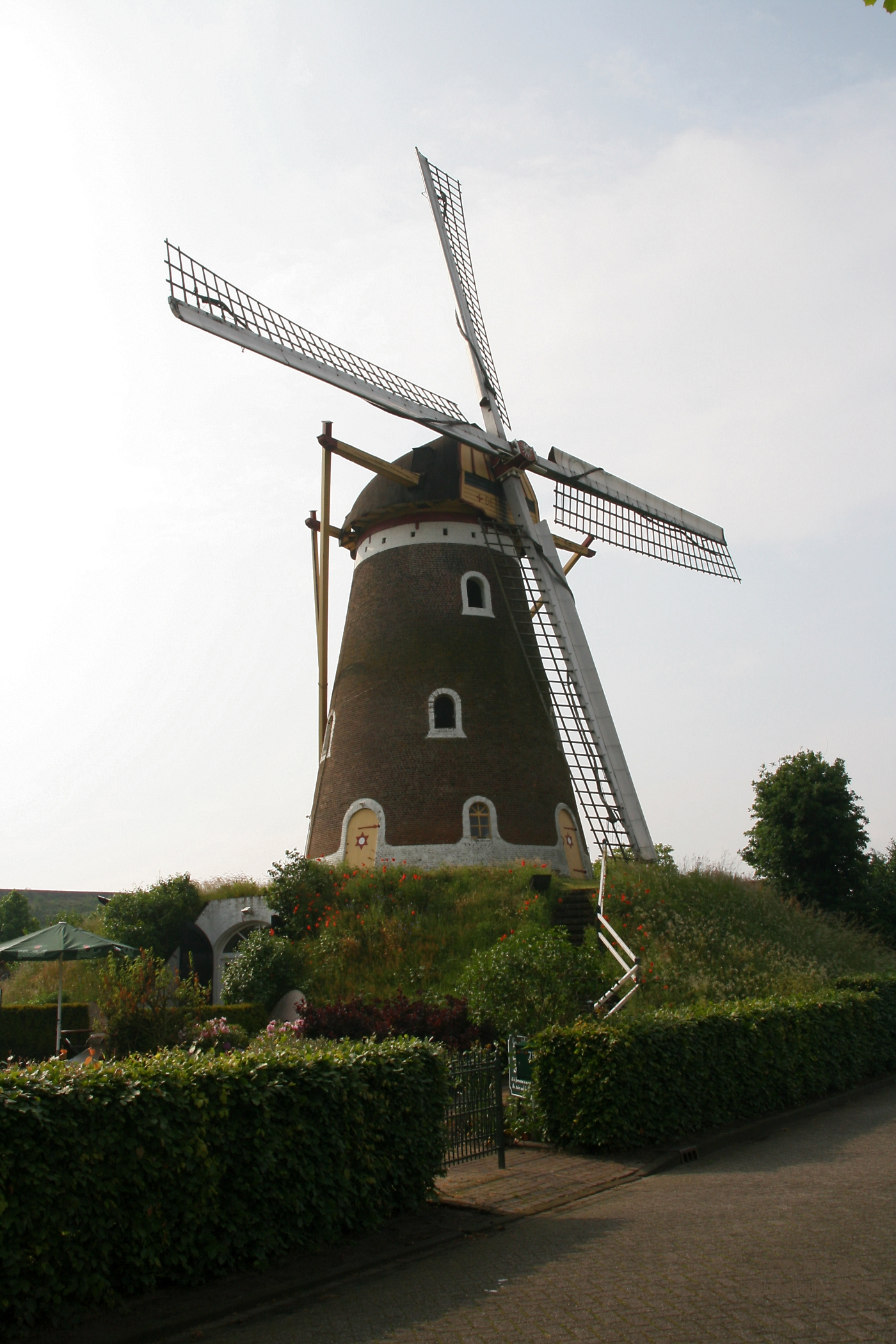

Origin
- Coordinates: 51.568878°N 4.822908°E
- Operator(s): Jack Verdaas, Mark Heutink
- Year built: 1865

De Hoop is a gristmill in Bavel, Netherlands. The mill was built in 1865.
