= National Mills Day =

Annual observance celebrating windmills

National Mills Weekend
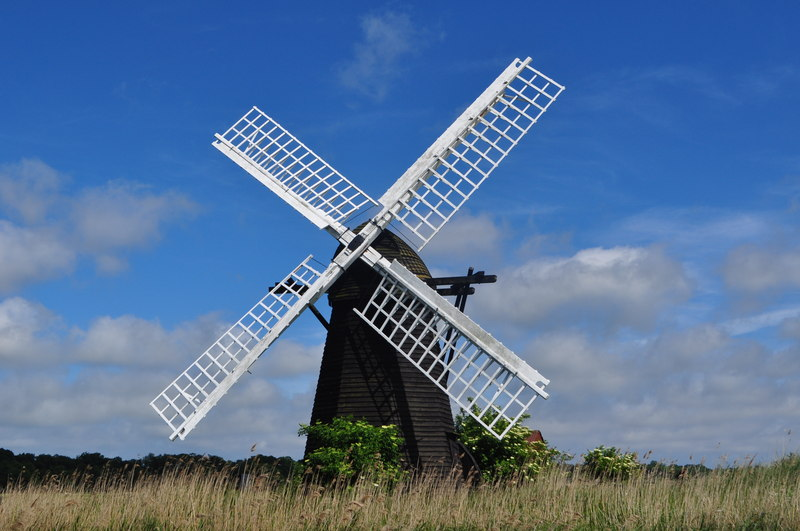
- Herringfleet Windmill in Suffolk, open to the public on National Mills Day
- Observed by: United Kingdom
- Type: Opening wind and watermills to the public
- Date: Second Saturday in May
- 2025 date: May 10
- 2026 date: May 9
- 2027 date: May 8
- 2028 date: May 13
- Duration: 2 days

A National Mills Day is an event celebrating windmills and is held in several European countries. In the United Kingdom, it occurs annually on the second Sunday in May. It started off as a single day event, but expanded to include Saturday as well as Sunday, and is now promoted as National Mills Weekend. The event is coordinated by the Wind and Watermills section of the Society for the Protection of Ancient Buildings. Traditionally, many preserved wind and watermills that are usually closed to the general public open their doors and offer an insight into the mill workings and history.

In support of National Mills Day, since 2025 Nunsfield House Amateur Radio Club coordinates hundreds of Amateur Radio stations who operate from alongside and sometimes inside the mills. The event was previously organised by Denby Dale Amateur Radio Club since its inception in 1996.

== Other countries ==
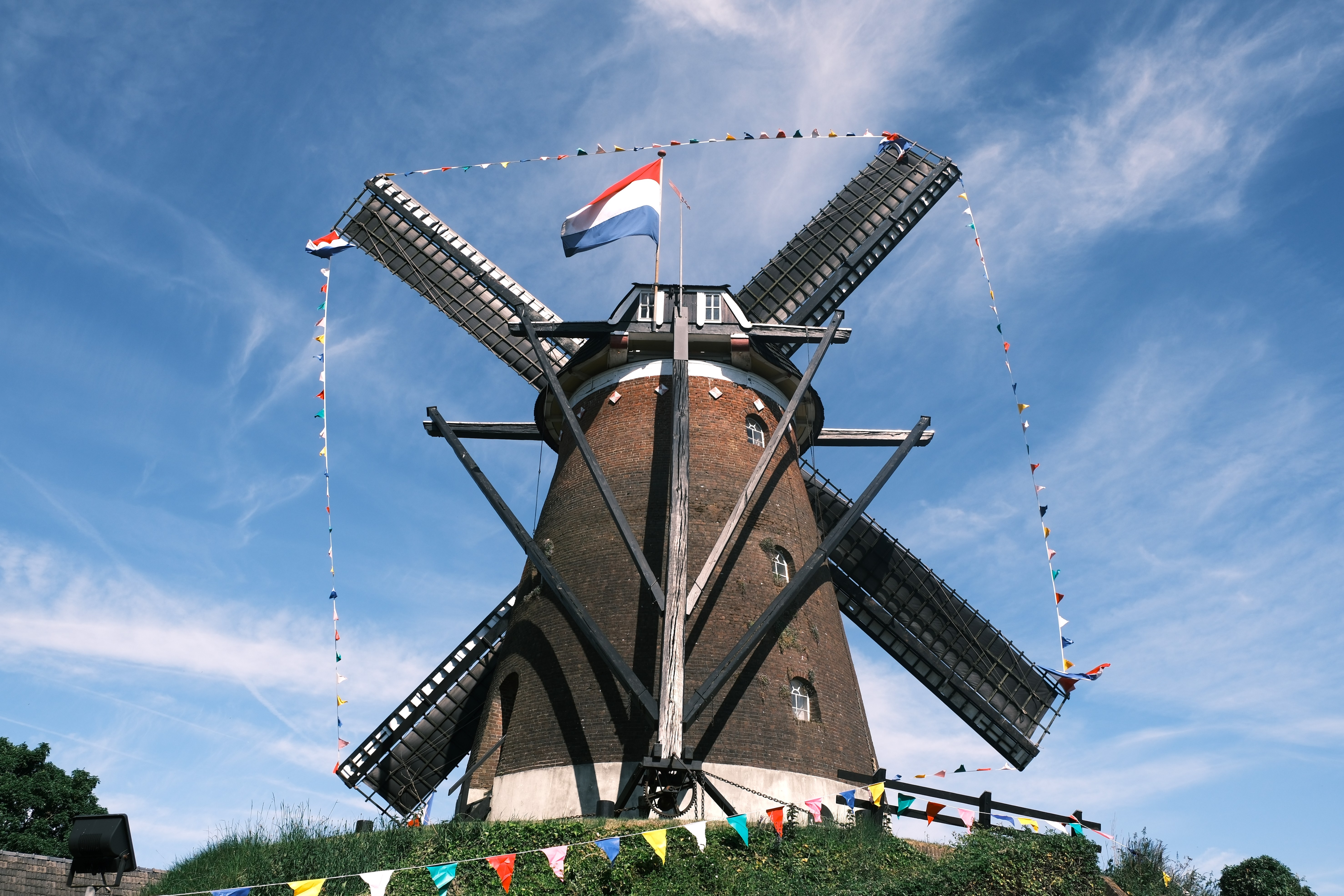
Windmill De Witten in Etten at Dutch national windmill day

Elsewhere in Europe, similar events are held in Germany, the Netherlands, Switzerland and other countries. Germany has the Deutscher Mühlentag on Whit Monday. The Netherlands holds its nationale Molendag on the second Saturday in May.
