= List of windmills in North Holland =

List of Dutch windmills

A list of windmills in the Dutch province of North Holland.

Location	Name of mill	Type	Built	Notes	Photograph
Aalsmeer	De Leeuw	Stellingmolen	1863	Molendatabase (in Dutch)	
Aalsmeer	Stommeermolen	Grondzeiler	1742	Molendatabase (in Dutch)	
Aalsmeer	De Zwarte Ruiter	Grondzeiler	1777	Molendatabase (in Dutch)	
Aartswoud	Westuit Nr. 7 Koggemolen	Grondzeiler	1585	Molendatabase (in Dutch)	
Akersloot	De Oude Knegt	Grondzeiler	2003	Molendatabase (in Dutch)	
Akersloot	Noordermolen	Grondzeiler	1589	Molendatabase (in Dutch)	
Alkmaar	De Piet	Stellingmolen	1769	Molendatabase (in Dutch)	
Alkmaar	De Eendracht	Grondzeiler	1771	Molendatabase (in Dutch)	
Alkmaar	De Viaan	Grondzeiler	1579	Molendatabase (in Dutch)	
Alkmaar	Geestmolen	Grondzeiler	1565	Molendatabase (in Dutch)	
Alkmaar	Robonsbosmolen	Grondzeiler	1781	Molendatabase (in Dutch)	
Alkmaar-Koedijk	De Sluismolen	Grondzeiler	1575	Molendatabase (in Dutch)	
Amstelveen	De Dikkert	Stellingmolen	1891	Molendatabase (in Dutch)	
Amsterdam	De Bloem; De Blom	Stellingmonen	1878	Molendatabase (in Dutch)	
Amsterdam	De Gooyer	Stellingmolen	1814	Molendatabase (in Dutch)	
Amsterdam	De Otter	Paltrokmolen	1631	Molendatabase (in Dutch)	
Amsterdam-Buiksloot	D'Admiraal	Stellingmolen	1792	Molendatabase (in Dutch)	
Amsterdam-Buitenveldert	De Riekermolen	Grondzeiler	1636	Molendatabase (in Dutch)	
Amsterdam-Sloten	Molen van Sloten	Stellingmolen	1990	Molendatabase (in Dutch)	
Amsterdam-Slotermeer	De 1100 Roe	Grondzeiler	1674	Molendatabase (in Dutch)	
Amsterdam-Slotermeer	De 1200 Roe	Grondzeiler	1632	Molendatabase (in Dutch)	
Amsterdam Zuid-Oost	Tjasker Gaasperplaspark	Tjasker	1978	Molendatabase (in Dutch)	
Ankeveen	Hollandia	Grondzeiler	1640	Molendatabase (in Dutch)	
Anna Paulowna	Leonide	Stellingmolen	2002	Molendatabase (in Dutch). Built at Uithuizen, Groningen in 1892, moved here in 2002.	
Bergen	Damlandermolen	Grondzeiler	1700	Molendatabase (in Dutch)	
Bergen	Philisteinse Molen	Grondzeiler	1897	Molendatabase (in Dutch)	
Bovenkarspel	Ceres	Stellingmolen	1849	Burnt down 31 December 2019. Molendatabase (in Dutch)	
Broek op Langedijk	Molen D Oosterdel	Grondzeiler	1868	Molendatabase (in Dutch)	
Burgerbrug	Molen F	Grondzeiler	1890	Molendatabase (in Dutch)	
Burgerbrug	Molen Zuider-G	Grondzeiler	c. 1598	Molendatabase (in Dutch)	
Burgervlotbrug	Molen L-Q	Grondzeiler	1598	Molendatabase (in Dutch)	
Callantsoog	De Zwaan	Weidemolen		Molendatabase (in Dutch)	
De Waal	De Kemphaan	Weidemolen	1934	Molendatabase (in Dutch)	
Den Oever	De Hoop	Grondzeiler	1675	Molendatabase (in Dutch)	
Driemond	Gemeenschapsmolen	Grondzeiler	1708	Molendatabase (in Dutch)	
Edam	Zuidpoldermolen	Grondzeiler	1670	Molendatabase (in Dutch)	
Egmond aan den Hoef	Bosmolen	Grondzeiler	1565	Molendatabase (in Dutch)	
Egmond aan den Hoef	Wimmenumer Molen	Grondzeiler	1774	Molendatabase (in Dutch)	
Egmond aan den Hoef	Remains of korenmolen van Egmond (also known as Koffiemolen)		1899		
Enkhuizen	Vogelhoeksmolen	Grondzeiler	19th century	Molendatabase (in Dutch)	
Etersheim	Etersheimer Braakmolen	Grondzeiler	1886	Molendatabase (in Dutch)	
Groenveld	De Groenvelder	Grondzeiler	1560	Molendatabase (in Dutch)	
Groet-Schoorl	Groetermolen	Grondzeiler	1890	Molendatabase (in Dutch)	
Grootschermer	De Havik	Grondzeiler	1576	Molendatabase (in Dutch)	
Grootschermer	Menningweermolen	Grondzeiler	1888	Molendatabase (in Dutch)	
Grootschermer	Grootschermer post mill	Weidemolen		Molendatabase (in Dutch)	
Haarlem	Schoterveense Molen	Wipmolen	17th century	Molendatabase (in Dutch)	
Haarlem	De Adriaan	Stellingmolen	2001	Molendatabase (in Dutch)	
Haarlem-Penningsveer	De Veer	Grondzeiler	2001	Molendatabase (in Dutch)	
Haarlem-Penningsveer	De Kleine Veer	Weidemolen	1992	Molendatabase (in Dutch)	
Haarlem-Schalkwijk	De Eenhoorn	paltrok mill	c. 1776	Molendatabase (in Dutch)	
Haarlem-Schalkwijk	De Kleine Molen; De Hommel	Grondzeiler	1879	Molendatabase (in Dutch)	
Haarlem-Vijfhuizen	Vijfhuizer Molen	Grondzeiler	1874	Molendatabase (in Dutch)	
Heemstede	Groenendaalse Molen	Stellingmolen		Molendatabase (in Dutch)	
Heerhugowaard	Veenhuizer	Grondzeiler	1603	Molendatabase (in Dutch)	
Heiloo	Varnebroekmolen	Wipmolen	1860	Molendatabase (in Dutch)	
Hensbroek	Poldermolen	Grondzeiler	1866	Molendatabase (in Dutch)	
Hippolytushoef	De Onderneming	Grondzeiler	1851	Molendatabase (in Dutch)	
Hoofddorp	De Eersteling	Grondzeiler	1856	Molendatabase (in Dutch)	
Hoogwoud	De Lastdrager	Grondzeiler	c. 1650	Molendatabase (in Dutch)	
Hoogwoud	De Vier Winden	Grondzeiler	1891	Molendatabase (in Dutch)	
Katwoude	De Kathammer	Grondzeiler	1896	Molendatabase (in Dutch)	
Koog aan de Zaan	Het Pink	Stellingmolen	1671	Molendatabase (in Dutch)	
Kortenhoef	Gabriël; Voorste Molen	Grondzeiler	1635	Molendatabase (in Dutch)	
Krommeniedijk	De Woudaap	Grondzeiler	1651	Molendatabase (in Dutch)	
Landsmeer	De Twiskemolen	Grondzeiler	1974	Molendatabase (in Dutch)	
Laren	De Korenmolen	Grondzeiler	1773	Molendatabase (in Dutch)	
Medemblik	De Herder	Stellingmolen	1988	Molendatabase (in Dutch)	
Middenbeemster	De Nachtegaal	Grondzeiler	1704	Molendatabase (in Dutch)	
Muiderberg	Meermolen; De Onrust	Grondzeiler	1809	Molendatabase (in Dutch)	
Neck	Neckermolen	Grondzeiler	1631	Molendatabase (in Dutch)	
Nederhorst den Berg	Nederhorst den Berg Windmill	Grondzeiler	1636	Molendatabase (in Dutch)	
Nieuwe Niedorp	De Westermolen	Grondzeiler	1854	Molendatabase (in Dutch)	
Obdam	Berkmeermolen	Grondzeiler	1803	Molendatabase (in Dutch). Built at Heerhugowaard in 1609, moved here in 1803.	
Obdam	Obdammermolen	Grondzeiler	1698	Molendatabase (in Dutch)	
Obdam	Weel & Braken	Wipmolen	1632	Molendatabase (in Dutch)	
Oosterblokker	De Krijgsman	Stellingmolen	1897	Molendatabase (in Dutch)	
Oosterend	Het Noorden	Grondzeiler	1878	Molendatabase (in Dutch)	
Oostwoud	Klikjesmolen	Kleine Molen	1987	Molendatabase (in Dutch)	
Oostzaan	De Windjager	Stellingmolen	Unknown/1961	Molendatabase (in Dutch)	
Oterleek	De Otter	Grondzeiler	1900	Molendatabase (in Dutch)	
Oude Niedorp	De Hoop	Gronzeiler	1641	Molendatabase (in Dutch)	
Ouderkerk aan de Amstel	De Zwaan	Grondzeiler	1638	Molendatabase (in Dutch)	
Oudeschild	De Traanroeier	Stellingmolen	1902	Molendatabase (in Dutch)	
Oudorp	't Roode Hert	Stellingmolen	1925	Molendatabase (in Dutch)	
Oudorp	Strijkmolen B	Grondzeiler	1630	Molendatabase (in Dutch)	
Oudorp	Strijkmolen C	Grondzeiler	2006	Molendatabase (in Dutch)	
Oudorp	Strijkmolen D	Grondzeiler	1628	Molendatabase (in Dutch)	
Oudorp	Strijkmolen E	Grondzeiler	1628	Molendatabase (in Dutch)	
Oudorp	Ambachtsmolen	Grondzeiler	1632	Molendatabase (in Dutch)	
Rustenburg	Strijkmolen I	Grondzeiler	1864	Molendatabase (in Dutch)	
Rustenburg	Strijkmolen K	Grondzeiler	1631	Molendatabase (in Dutch)	
Rustenburg	Strijkmolen L	Grondzeiler	1631	Molendatabase (in Dutch)	
Santpoort	De Zandhaas	Stellingmolen	1779	Molendatabase (in Dutch)	
Schagerbrug	Molen D	Grondzeiler	1840	Molendatabase (in Dutch)	
Schagerbrug	Molen O-D; Ooster-N	Grondzeiler	18th century	Molendatabase (in Dutch)	
Schellinkhout	De Grote Molen	Grondzeiler	1630	Molendatabase (in Dutch)	
Schellinkhout	Johan	Kleine Molen	1956	Molendatabase (in Dutch)	
Schermerhorn	Bovenmolen E	Grondzeiler	1633	Molendatabase (in Dutch)	
Schermerhorn	Bovenmolen G	Grondzeiler	1633	Molendatabase (in Dutch)	
Schermerhorn	Ondermolen C	Grondzeiler	1635	Molendatabase (in Dutch)	
Schermerhorn	Ondermolen D	Grondzeiler	1633	Molendatabase (in Dutch)	
Schermerhorn	Ondermolen K	Grondzeiler	1633	Molendatabase (in Dutch)	
Schermerhorn	Poldermolen O	Grondzeiler	1635	Molendatabase (in Dutch)	
Schoorl	Hagermolen	Grondzeiler	1804	Molendatabase (in Dutch)	
Schoorl	Kijkduin	Grondzeiler	1772	Molendatabase (in Dutch)	
Schoorldam	De Grebmolen	Grondzeiler	1875	Molendatabase (in Dutch)	
Sint Maartensvlotbrug	Molen N-G; Noorder G	Grondzeiler	17th century	Molendatabase (in Dutch)	
Sint Maartensvlotbrug	Molen N-M; Noorder M	Grondzeiler	1657	Molendatabase (in Dutch)	
Sint Pancras	Molen A	Grondzeiler	1663	Molendatabase (in Dutch)	
Spaarndam-Oost	De Slokop	Grondzeiler	1833	Molendatabase (in Dutch)	
Spanbroek	De Kaagmolen	Grondzeiler	1654	Molendatabase (in Dutch)	
Spanbroek	De Westerveer	Grondzeiler	1873	Molendatabase (in Dutch)	
Stompetoren	Poldermolen D	Grondzeiler	1635	Molendatabase (in Dutch)	
Stompetoren	Poldermolen E	Grondzeiler	1634	Molendatabase (in Dutch)	
Stompetoren	Poldermolen M	Grondzeiler	1635	Molendatabase (in Dutch)	
Tuitjenhorn	Molen van Piet	Stellingmolen	2007	Molendatabase (in Dutch)	
't Zand	Molen O-T	Grondzeiler	17th century	Molendatabase (in Dutch)	
't Zand	Molen P-V	Grondzeiler	17th century	Molendatabase (in Dutch)	
Uitgeest	Tweede Broekermolen	Grondzeiler	1631	Molendatabase (in Dutch)	
Uitgeest	De Dog	Grondzeiler	1896	Molendatabase (in Dutch)	
Uitgeest	De Dorregeester	Grondzeiler	1896	Molendatabase (in Dutch)	
Uitgeest	De Kat; De Zien	Grondzeiler	1973	Molendatabase (in Dutch)	
Uitgeest	De Jonge Leeuw	Stellingmolen	2008	Molendatabase (in Dutch). Built at Tjilbert, Friesland in 1910, moved here in 2008	
Ursem	Ondermolen O	Grondzeiler	1633	Molendatabase (in Dutch)	
Waarland	Poldermolen	Grondzeiler	1590	Molendatabase (in Dutch)	
Waarland	Slootgaardmolen	Grondzeiler	c. 1590	Molendatabase (in Dutch)	
Weesp	't Haantje	Stellingmolen	1820	Molendatabase (in Dutch)	
Weesp	De Eendragt	Stellingmolen	1952	Molendatabase (in Dutch)	
Weesp	De Vriendschap	Stellingmolen	1900	Molendatabase (in Dutch)	
Wervershoof	De Hoop	Stellingmolen	1889	Molendatabase (in Dutch)	
Westzaan	De Zwaan	Weidemolen		Molendatabase (in Dutch)	
Westzaan	De Jonge Dirk	Stellingmolen	1908	Molendatabase (in Dutch)	
Westzaan	De Schoolmeester	Stellingmolen	1692	Molendatabase (in Dutch)	
Westzaan	Het Prinsenhof	Stellingmolen	1722	Molendatabase (in Dutch)	
Westzaan	De Jonge Dolfijn; De Koperen Berg	Stellingmolen	1692	Moved to Joure, Friesland (Penninga's Molen) in 1900	
Westzaan	De Veldmuis	Stellingmolen	2020	Electricity generator.	
Wieringerwaard	De Hoop	Grondzeiler	1742	Molendatabase (in Dutch)	
Wijdenes	De Stofmolen	Stellingmolen	1911	Molendatabase (in Dutch)	
Wogmeer	Nieuwe Leven	Grondzeiler	1608	Molendatabase (in Dutch)	
Wognum	Molen van de Kerkepolder	Weidemolen	1866	Molendatabase (in Dutch)	
Wormer	De Koker; Zwarte Hengst	Grondzeiler	1866	Molendatabase (in Dutch)	
Zaandam	De Bonte Hen	stellingmolen	1975	Molendatabase (in Dutch)	
Zaandam	De Gekroonde Poelenburg	paltrok mill	1903	Molendatabase (in Dutch)	
Zaandam	De Hadel	Weidemolen	1968	Molendatabase (in Dutch)	
Zaandam	De Held Jozua	paltrok mill	1719	Molendatabase (in Dutch)	
Zaandam	De Huisman	Stellingmolem	1955	Molendatabase (in Dutch)	
Zaandam	De Kat	Stellingmolen	1781	Molendatabase (in Dutch)	
Zaandam	De Ooievaar	Stellingmolen	1669	Molendatabase (in Dutch)	
Zaandam	De Zoeker	Stellingmolen	1968	Molendatabase (in Dutch). Built at Zaandijk in 1676, moved here in 1968.	
Zaandam	Het Klaverblad	Stellingmolen	2000	Molendatabase (in Dutch)	
Zaandam	Herkules	Iron Windpump	1925	Molendatabase (in Dutch)	
Zaandam	Kaatmolen	Weidemolen	1993	Molendatabase (in Dutch)	
Zaandam	De Windhond	stellingmolen	1890	Molendatabase (in Dutch)	
Zaandam	De Zwarte Kalf	Weidemolen	2005	Molendatabase (in Dutch)	
Zaandam	De Kroosduiker	Weidemolen	1933	Molendatabase (in Dutch)	
Zaandam	Het Jonge Schaap	Stellingmolen	2007	Molendatabase (in Dutch)	
Zaandijk	De Bleeke Dood	Stellingmolen	1656	Molendatabase (in Dutch)	
Zaanstreek	De Walrot	Achtkantmolen	1683	Moved to IJlst (De Rat) in 1828	
Zuidschermer	Paaltjasker Zuidschermer	Tjasker	1987	Molendatabase (in Dutch)	
Zuidschermer	Poldermolen K	Grondzeiler	1635	Molendatabase (in Dutch)	
