= Otter (disambiguation) =

An otter is an aquatic or marine carnivorous mammal.

Otter may also refer to:

== Places ==
- Otter, Germany, a municipality in Lower Saxony
- Otter, Ontario, Canada, a dispersed rural community
- Otter, Montana, United States, an unincorporated community
- Otter, Ohio, United States, an unincorporated community
- River Otter, Devon, England

== Technology ==
=== Vessels and vehicles ===
- Otter (dinghy), a type of two-man sailing dinghy
- Otter (steamship), a sidewheeler used by the Hudson's Bay Company in the Pacific Northwest from the 1830s
- Otter (sternwheeler), 1874–1897, mainly in Puget Sound
- Otter (1795 ship), American sailing ship on which Thomas Muir of Huntershill escaped from an Australian convict settlement in 1796
- CFAV Otter, an auxiliary ship of the Royal Canadian Navy
- HMCS Otter, a ship of the Royal Canadian Navy
- HMQS Otter, a patrol and examination vessel of the Queensland Maritime Defence Force, and later the Royal Australian Navy
- HMS Otter, several ships of the Royal Navy
- USS Otter (DE-210), a destroyer escort of the United States Navy
- Otter Light Reconnaissance Car, an armoured car built in Canada during World War II
- De Havilland Canada DHC-3 Otter and De Havilland Canada DHC-6 Twin Otter aircraft
- M76 Otter, an amphibious cargo carrier used by the United States Marine Corps during the Vietnam War

=== Computing ===
- Otter.ai, a web application which transcribes speech-to-text
- Otter Browser, an open-source web browser clone of Opera web browser
- Otter (theorem prover), a public domain software program

== Sports teams ==
- Cal State Monterey Bay Otters, the athletics teams of California State University, Monterey Bay
- Evansville Otters, a Frontier League baseball team
- Erie Otters, a junior hockey team in the Ontario Hockey League, based in Erie, Pennsylvania
- Huntsville Otters, a junior "C" hockey team, from Huntsville, Ontario
- Missouri River Otters, a minor pro team in the United Hockey League from 1999 to 2006

== People ==
- Otter (surname)
- Otter or Ótr, son of Hreidmar, a dwarf in Norse mythology
- Otter, a main character in the 1978 film Animal House, played by Tim Matheson
- Otter (gay culture), LGBT slang similar to bear, but referring to a thinner build
- Otter (cannabis culture), slang for a habitual consumer of cannabis, from turkish "ot'" meaning grass, weed, or cannabis

== Other ==
- Otter (2025 film), a Montenegrin coming of age film
- Otter Media, a mass media company owned by Warner Bros. Discovery
- Otter, or ottu (instrument), a drone-oboe played in Southern India
- De Otter, Amsterdam, a windmill
- Orthodontic Technicians Association (abbreviated as OTA and pronounced "otter")
- Otter (fishing device), a floating fishing device used from boat or from land equipped with a steering mechanism

== See also ==
- Maris Otter, a brand name for pale malted barley
- Ottery (disambiguation)
