= Aartswoud =

- Village
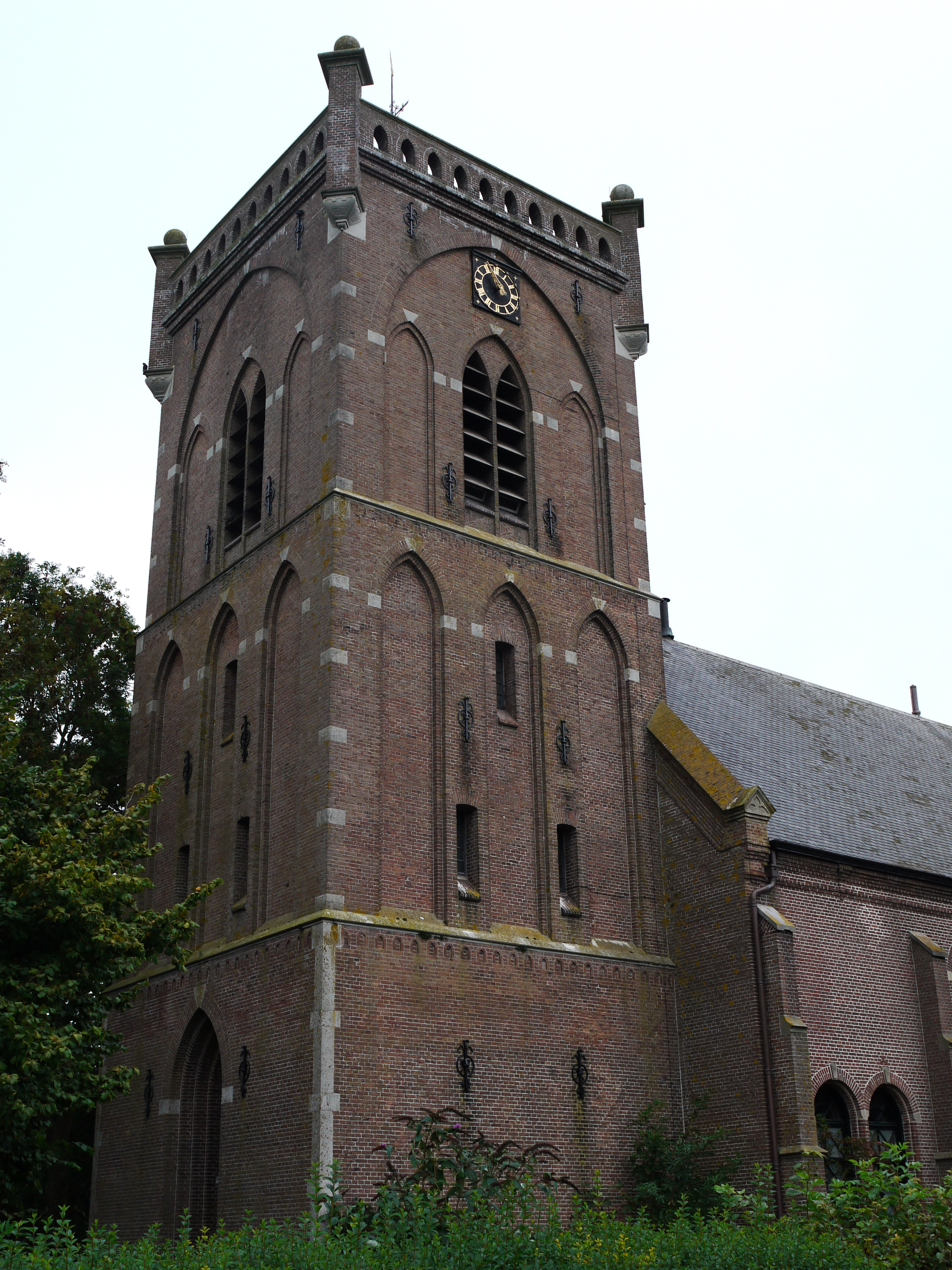
- Dutch Reformed church

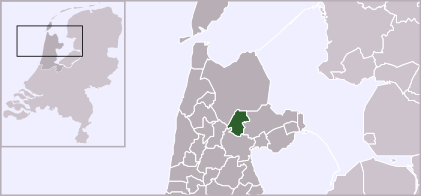

- Aartswoud in the municipality of Opmeer.

- Location in the Netherlands Location in the province of North Holland in the Netherlands
- Coordinates: 52°44′40″N 4°57′13″E
- Country: Netherlands
- Province: North Holland
- Municipality: Opmeer

Population (2025)
  - Total: 460
- Time zone: UTC+1 (CET)
  - Summer (DST): UTC+2 (CEST)

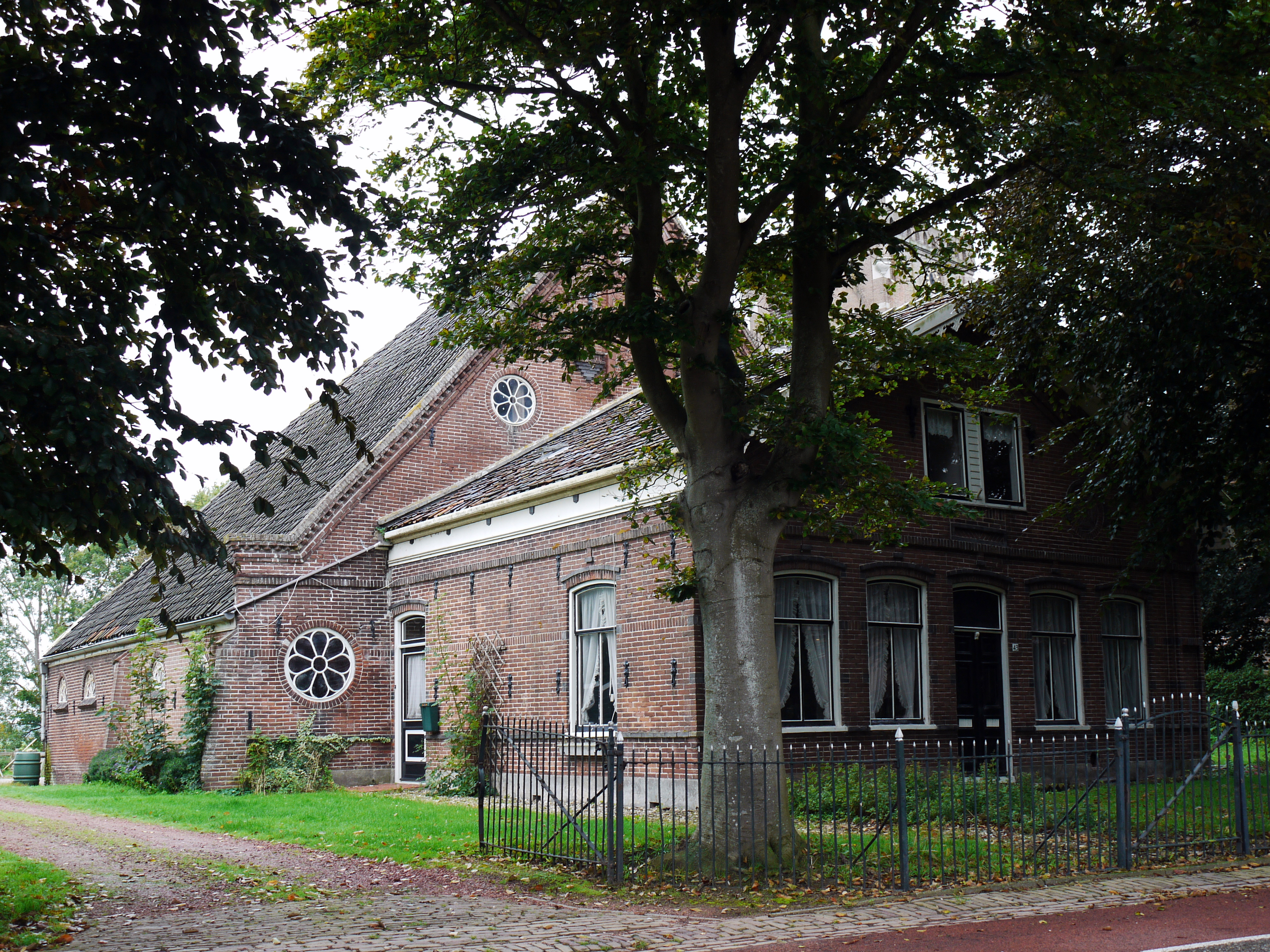

Aartswoud (West Frisian: Ierswoud) is a village in the Dutch province of North Holland, part of the municipality of Opmeer. It lies about twelve kilometres (7.5 mi) northeast of Heerhugowaard.

Aartswoud has been inhabited since the Neolithic, and a church may have existed as early as 1395; the village still has a 16th-century church tower. Formerly a harbor settlement on the Zuiderzee, it became landlocked after the Wieringermeer was created. The village sits on the Westfriese Omringdijk, a dike completed in 1250 that protects an area of 800 km^{2} (310 sq mi), and is now an accesspoint for several nature reserves that reclaim the land, the landscape, the water levels, and the flora and fauna of the earlier West-Frisian countryside.

== History ==
The area of Aartswoud has been inhabited since the late Neolithic age, and a settlement there (whose remains are 40–80 metres (130–260 ft) wide and 300 metres (980 ft) long) is an important source for the Beaker culture. Macrobotanical remains from the site are of Einkorn wheat, Emmer, Common wheat, Naked and Hulled barley, and Flax. (Note: Louwe Kooijmans refers for a more extensive description to Pals, J. P. (1983). "Plant remains from Aartswoud, a Neolithic site in the coastal area". In van Zeist, W.; Casparie, W.A. (eds.). Plants and Ancient Man. Rotterdam. pp. 313–21.) In the Middle Ages, and until the later Wieringermeer was poldered in and the harbor filled in, Aartswoud was a harbor village on the Zuiderzee.

The first documented occurrence of the name is from 1311, Nedartswoude; variants are Edaertswoude and Edairtswoude. The name is a possible reference to the wooded area (woud) owned by the Edaert family, whose name is Frisian. This later became Aertswoud (1450) with variant spellings for the initial vowel sounds, and finally Aartswoud.

An edict from 1404 mandates that the dike at Aartswoud should always be able to be breached in case of an emergency; this happened in 1573, during the Siege of Alkmaar, when polders in the area of the Spanish encampment were flooded. The village was the location of some excitement in 1799 when, during the Anglo-Russian invasion of Holland, Batavian commander Herman Willem Daendels charged at a troop of British soldiers led by Lieutenant-Colonel Stewart, and captured twenty men and thirteen horses.

According to a source from 1844, the area including Hoogwoud and Aartswoud was owned by Edward or Evert, a son of William IV, Duke of Bavaria, who took the surname Hoogwoud for his family. In 1607 it was acquired by Lamoraal II van Egmont, of the Egmond family. In the middle of the 18th century, it was owned by Willem Maurits van Cats, and by 1844 by Mattheus Johannes Worbert, count of Wassenaar.

=== Church and tower ===
A church in Aartswoud is attested probably in 1395 under the name Nederswout, and certainly for the years 1460–1550, according to the archives of the Domfabriek, the administrative center belonging to St. Martin's Cathedral, Utrecht. The inscription "1515" was supposedly carved on one of the church's beams. Before its demolition the church was surveyed and sketched; the drawings are archived at the Rijksdienst voor het Cultureel Erfgoed.

The present-day Dutch Reformed church dates from 1884 and was designed by C. Deutekom and C. Leeuw. Its square brick tower, in three sections surmounted by a small stone dome, is medieval and dates from the first half of the 16th century. An inscribed stone above the entrance dates repair work to 1635. The church bell was cast by Henricus Nieman in the 1620s. The tower's neo-Gothic detail stems from 1895, when the structure was covered on the west and south sides in new brick and stone and the lowest section of the north side plastered over. The current hall church replaces the late Gothic church, and has eclectic details and cast-iron window frames. It has a box pew dating from 1641, richly decorated with "beautiful examples of 17th-c wood carvings", which belonged to the Soete van Laecken family, according to a heraldic image. The church organ was built in 1885 by German organ builder Richard Paul Ibach. The large rectory was built in 1872.

Local folklore holds that the church tower also functioned as a lighthouse, since the coast at Aartswoud was dangerous, and that fires were also built to confuse ships in hopes of them foundering, so their cargo could be stolen.

== Physical and social geography ==
The village is a linear settlement which started with the habitation and exploitation of a raised bog in the late Middle Ages. At the time the village was on the Zuiderzee; in the middle of the 16th century a harbor was dug, which was subsequently filled in after the formation of the Wieringermeer (to the north of the village) in 1930.

Aartswoud was an independent village until 1812; on 1 January 1812 it was subsumed in the Hoogwoud municipality. As well as the village itself, it included a number of houses along the east side of the Langereis and the northern part of De Gouwe, and part of the Kold van Dussen. Judicially, it fell under the jurisdiction of Heerlijkheid of Hoogwoud until March 1811.

Aartswoud had a congregation of the Continental Reformed church, which later became a Dutch Reformed congregation, and had its own church council and preacher. The Aartswoud Catholics fell under the mission of Hoogwoud.

== Population ==
The statistical area "Aartswoud", which also can include the surrounding countryside, has a population of around 490. Earlier counts typically combine Aartswoud with Hoogwoud.

=== Hoogwoud and Aartswoud, combined ===
- 1457 (1841)
- 1460+ (1844) (Note: Source notes that most worked in agriculture; some 300 families lived in about 250 homes. Most of the population (930) were Dutch Reformed, with churches in Hoogwoud and Aartswoud. Evangelical Lutherans attended church in Medemblik, as did the four Mennonites; more than 530 were Catholic and had a church in Hoogwoud.)
- 2091 (1875)

== Nature reserves and other attractions ==
The village is home to a cattle museum, whose mission is to save older varieties of cattle from extinction. Nearby is the windmill Westuit Nr. 7, also known as Koggemolen. Three nature reserves near the village, the Weelpolder, the Braakpolder, and Kolk van Dussen, are governed by Landschap Noord-Holland.

=== Weelpolder ===
The Weelpolder nature reserve is adjacent to the village.

=== Braakpolder ===
Aartswoud gives access to the Braakpolder (braak, "breach", points to its origin; it results from a former breach in the dike). The Braakpolder is now a nature reserve, and farmers who rent this land are obliged to keep the land as natural as possible, and may for instance mow the grassland only after the chicks of wading birds such as the Northern lapwing have flown. The Braakpolder is one of a dozen or so of the most important archeological locations in the province, with remains as old as 2500 BCE. To safeguard them the water level was raised, to create a more oxygen-poor environment that prolongs their existence. South of the Braakpolder is an area called Braakpolder Zuid, which was set up to function as an overflow in times of high water.

=== Kolk van Dussen ===
Nearby is the Kolk van Dussen; the kolk also owes its existence to a breach in the dike, later repaired. In 1640 the entire Kolk was diked in: the reed growing in it belonged to the churches of Aartswoud and Hoogwoud (the Kolk was in the separate municipality of Hoogwoud, which merged with Opmeer in 1979). The soil level in the reed grounds had risen more than a foot and a half above the surrounding land, and thus the reed harvest became less each year, the reed being a source of income for the churches. They asked to be allowed to polder in the entire area, and despite protests from the other landowners (who would have to sell their land to the province and would also have been responsible for payments to maintain the dike) the Kolk was surrounded by a dike—the Omringdijk already protected the north, and a 166 m (545 ft) high dike was constructed in the south. An 1894 source reports a mill with screw pump on the west, with the water draining into the canal which at the time also served as the outlet for the Stoomgemaal Vier Noorder Koggen, the steam-powered mill that drains the water from Aartswoud.

The Kolk was recently again breached to restore wetland habitat. Meadow birds in the area include the Northern lapwing, the Black-tailed godwit, the Eurasian oystercatcher, the Great crested grebe, the Common redshank, the Common shelduck, the Black-headed gull, and the Pied avocet.

The Westfriese Omringdijk runs along the Kolk, and the bicycle path between Aartswoud and Lambertschaag goes through it; there is an observation tower. The landscape evidences the entire history of the West-Frisian land, including inversieruggen (higher areas of sand in former mudflat areas), daliegaten (holes formed by the digging up of clay, which then filled up with peat that continues to sink, as opposed to the surrounding clay ground), the Omringdijk itself, and the subdivision (verkaveling) of the 17th century. While much of the area has lost its small-scale relief through levelling, old meadows of Cynosurus cristatus are still present. Those meadows are helped by the restoration of former seasonal water levels: higher in the winter, lower in the summer. Clay pits in the northern part of the area are home to Common reed and a variety of rare orchids. Part of the area has been turned into a wetland designed to mimic the tidal landscape that existed before the Omringdijk and to serve as a reservoir at high water. A creek is surrounded by wet grasslands, attracting wading birds; the area is likely to flood once every five years, and can contain 60,000 m^{3} (2.1 million ft^{3}) of water.
