= Westuit Nr. 7 =

Windmill on the Kolkweg in Aartswoud, North Holland, Netherlands

Westuit Nr. 7 / Koggemolen
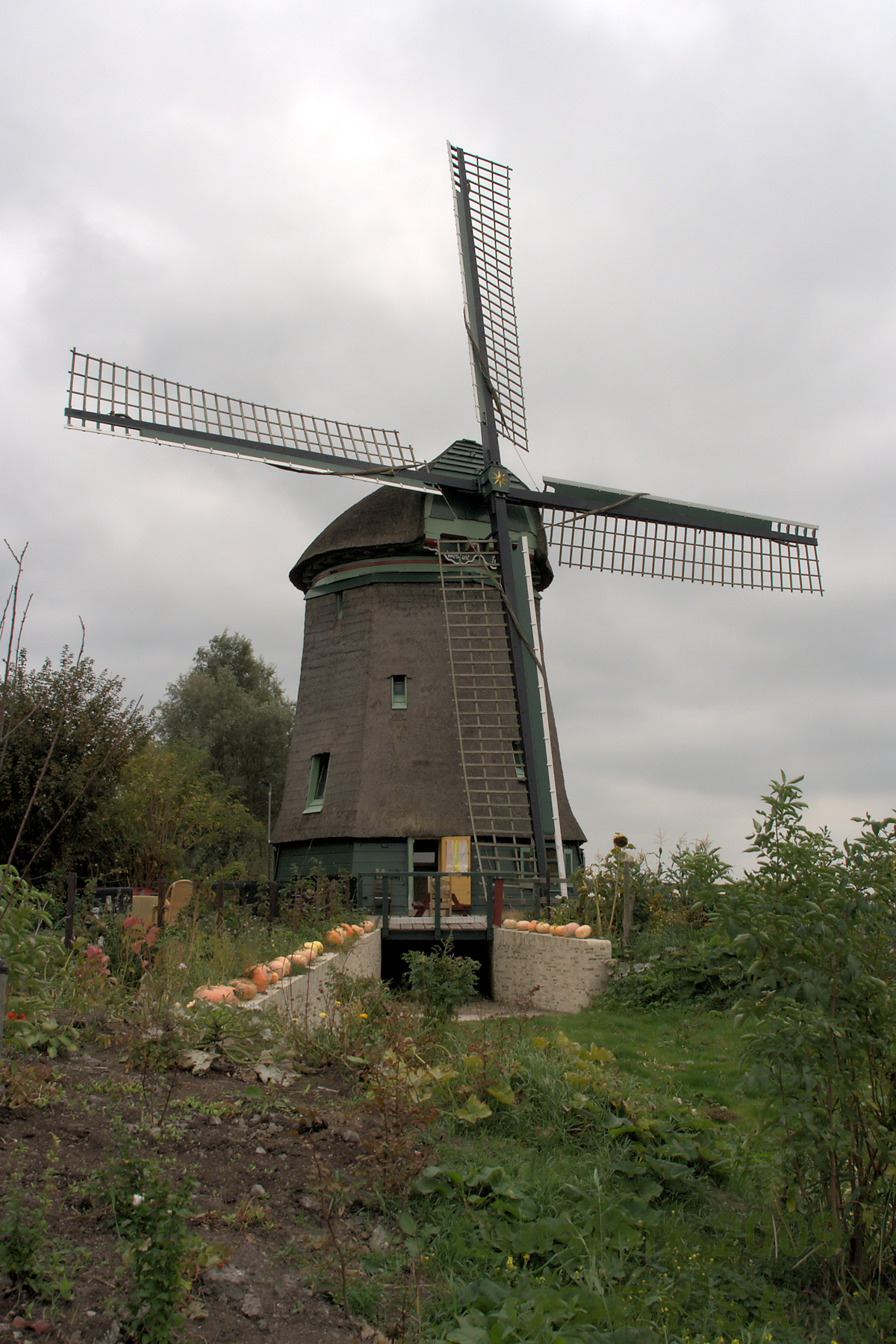
- Westuit Nr. 7

Origin
- Mill name: Westuit Nr. 7
- Mill location: Kolkweg 2, 1719NL, Aartswoud, North Holland, Netherlands
- Coordinates: 54°44′59″N 4°58′23″E
- Operator(s): Stichting de Westfriese Molens
- Year built: c. 1541

Information
- Purpose: Drainage mill
- Type: Grondzeiler
- Storeys: Three-storey smock
- Base storeys: Single story base
- Smock sides: Eight
- No. of sails: Four
- Type of sails: Common sails
- Windshaft: Cast iron
- Winding: Internal winch
- Type of pump: Archimedes' screw
- Other information: Rijksmonument No. 31787

The Westuit Nr. 7, also called the Koggemolen, is a windmill on the Kolkweg in Aartswoud, Netherlands that has been restored to working order. It is listed as a Rijksmonument, number 31787. The mill is to the south of the Westfriesedijk (part of the Westfriese Omringdijk) just outside Aartswoud. It is owned by Stichting de Westfriese Molens.

== History ==
The mill is probably the oldest of its type in North Holland, dating to c. 1541. It was one of 24 mills that drained water from the Vier Noorder Koggen into the Zuiderzee The mills drained an area of 13.524 hectares (33.42 acres). In 1869, a steam-powered pumping station was built in Medemblik. It drove two Archimedes' screws and two scoopwheels. These were replaced by centrifugal pumps in 1897. Following the replacement of the steam engines by gas engines in 1908, it was decided to abandon the use of wind power in the area. Two of the mills were converted to residential use, and the others were demolished. One of the two conversions was later demolished, leaving Westuit Nr. 7 as the sole survivor.

In 1990, it was decided that the mill should be restored. By 1997, it had been restored externally and was able to turn in the wind. Restoration of the internal machinery was completed in 2009, and the mill was again able to pump water. This is done on a closed-circuit basis. The mill is listed as a Rijksmonument, No. 31787.

== Description ==
Westuit Nr. 7 is a three-story smock mill on a single-story base. The smock and cap are thatched. The cap carries four common sails of 23.40 metres (76 ft 9 in) span. They are carried on a cast iron windshaft, which was cast in 1875 by De Prins van Oranje, The Hague. Winding is by an internal winch. The mill drives a wooden Archimedes' screw.
