= Ottery =

Ottery may refer to:

- Ottery, Cape Town
- Ottery Hundred, Devon, England
  - Ottery St Mary
    - Ottery St Mary A.F.C.
    - Ottery St Mary railway station
- River Ottery, Cornwall, England

== See also ==
- Otter (disambiguation)
- Oteri, surname
