= Oteri =

Oteri is a surname. Notable people with the name include:

- Cheri Oteri (born 1962), American comedic actress
- Frank J. Oteri (born 1964), American composer and music journalist
- Tom Oteri (died 2008), discoverer, publisher and best friend of American songwriter and musician Richard Fagan, who inadvertently caused Oteri's death

== See also ==
- Ottery (disambiguation)
