= Midwoud =

- Village
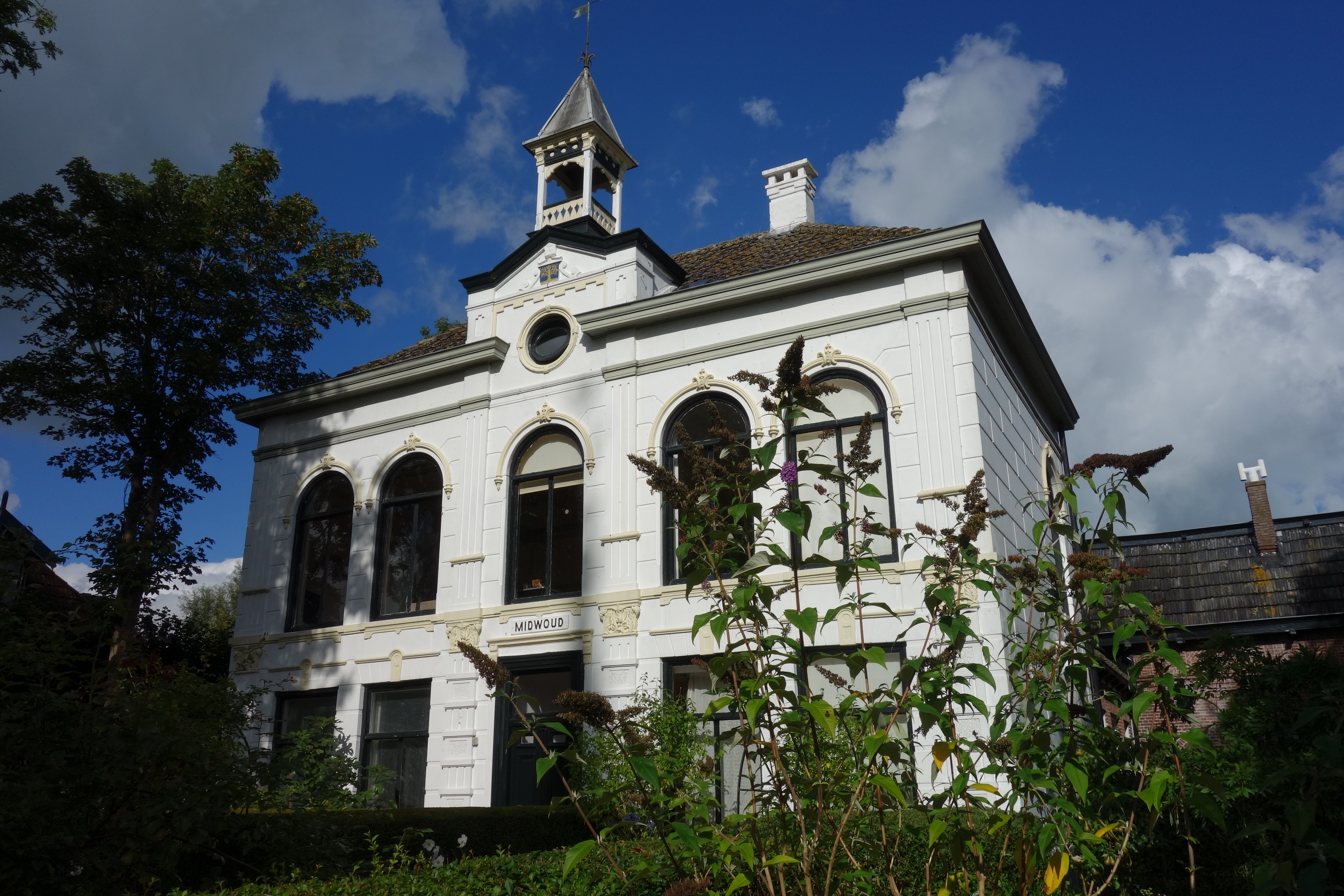
- Former town hall

- Coat of arms

- Location in the Netherlands Location in the province of North Holland in the Netherlands
- Coordinates: 52°43′N 5°4′E
- Country: Netherlands
- Province: North Holland
- Municipality: Medemblik

Area
  - Village: 5.84 km^{2} (2.25 sq mi)
- Elevation: −1.5 m (−4.9 ft)

Population (2025)
  - Village: 2,510
  - Density: 430/km^{2} (1,110/sq mi)
  - Urban: 2,265
  - Rural: 245
- Time zone: UTC+1 (CET)
  - Summer (DST): UTC+2 (CEST)
- Postal code: 1679
- Dialing code: 0229

Midwoud is a village in the Dutch province of North Holland. It is a part of the municipality of Medemblik, and lies about 7 km north of Hoorn.

== History ==
The village was first mentioned around 1312 as Midwoude, and means "middle forest". Middle is used, because it is located between Oostwoud and Nibbixwoud. Midwoud developed in the Late Middle Ages as a peat excavation settlement.

In 1984, the Dutch Reformed church burnt down, and only the neoclassic church tower from 1867 remained. A new church was built in 1987 near the old church leaving the tower detached.

Midwoud was home to 218 people in 1840. It was an independent municipality. In 1979, the area of that municipality became part of Noorder-Koggenland and Wognum. In 1990, houses were built in the area between Midwoud and Oostwoud, thus forming a single build-up area. In 2007, it became part of the municipality of Medemblik.

== Gallery ==
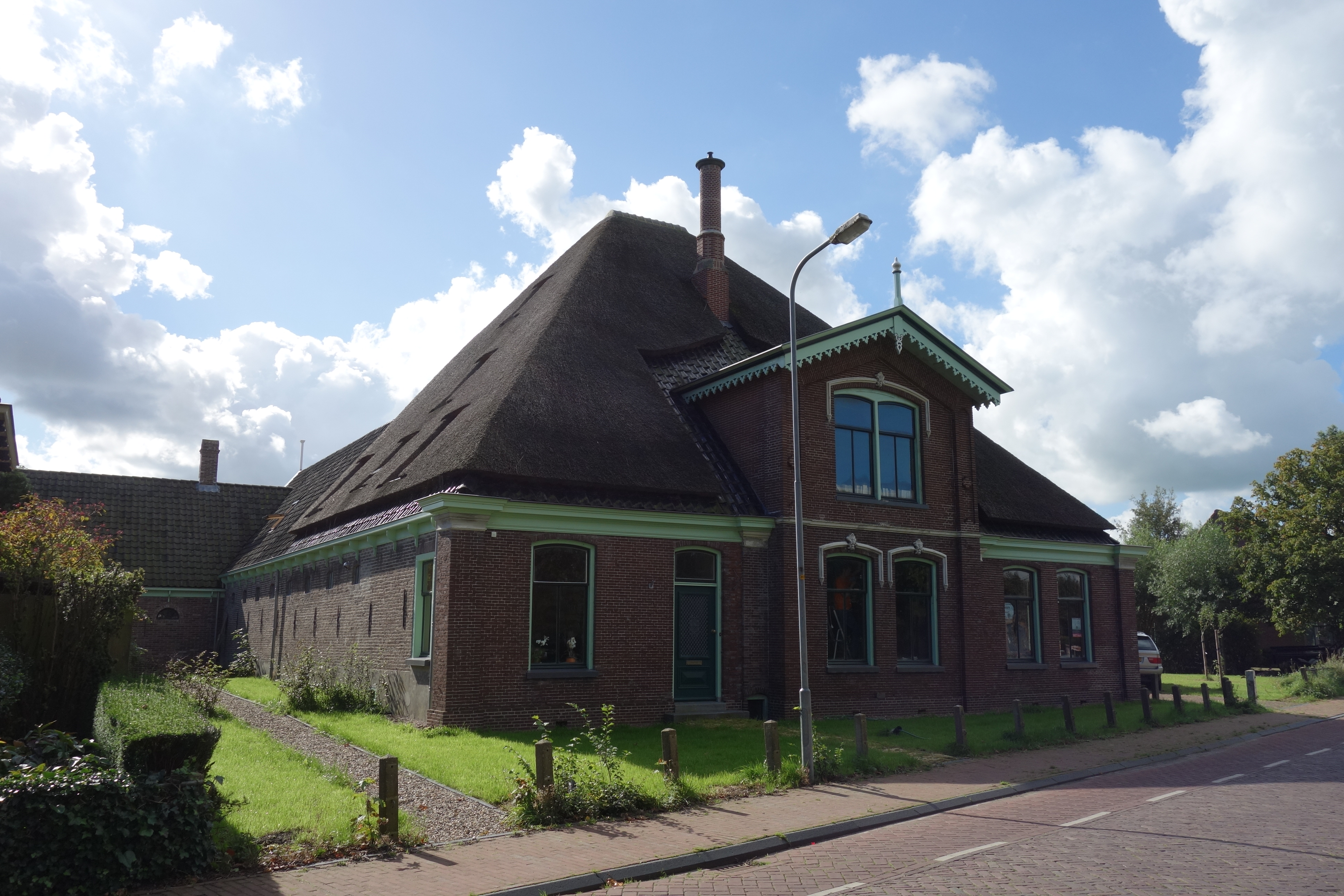
Farm in Midwoud

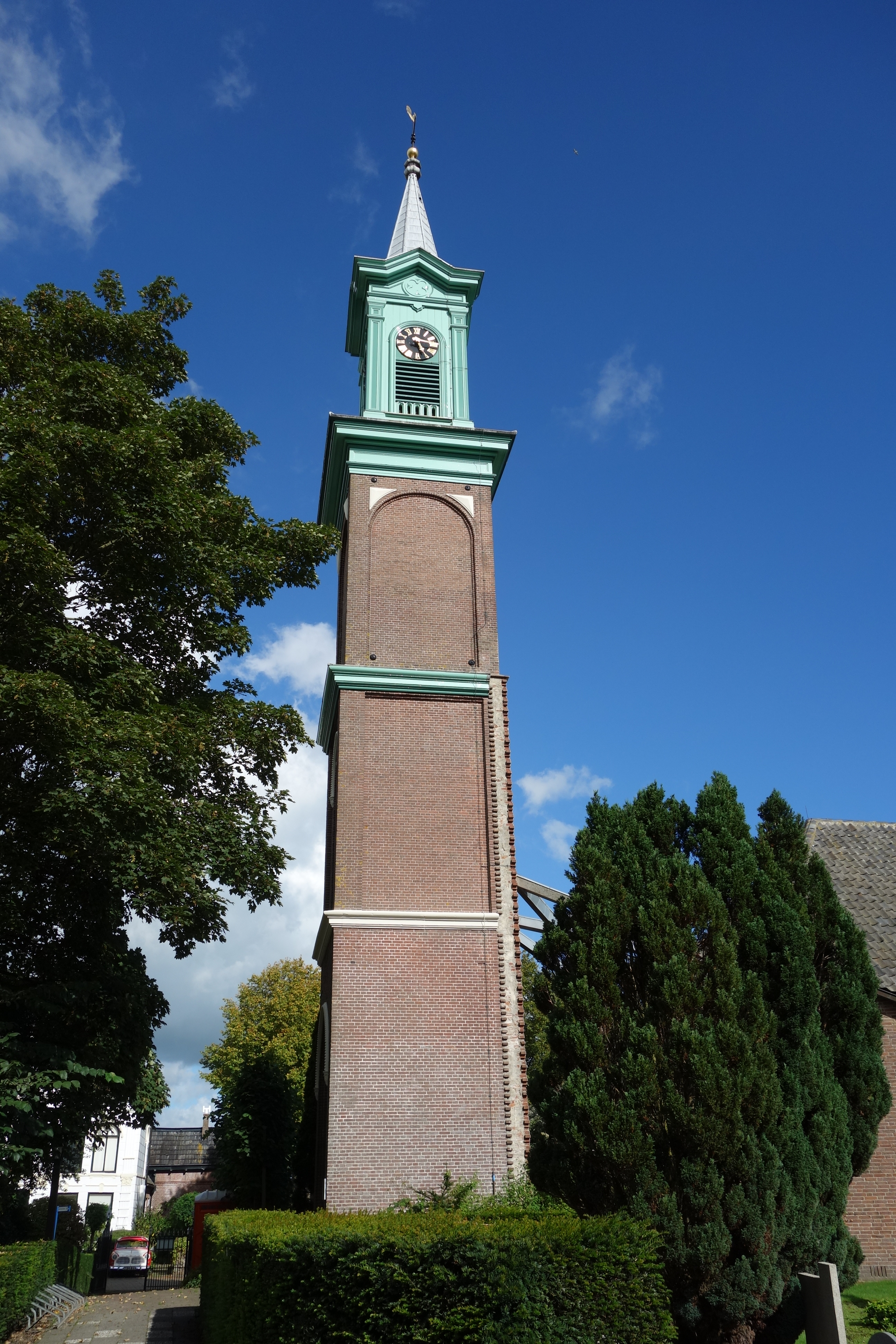
Church tower of Midwoud

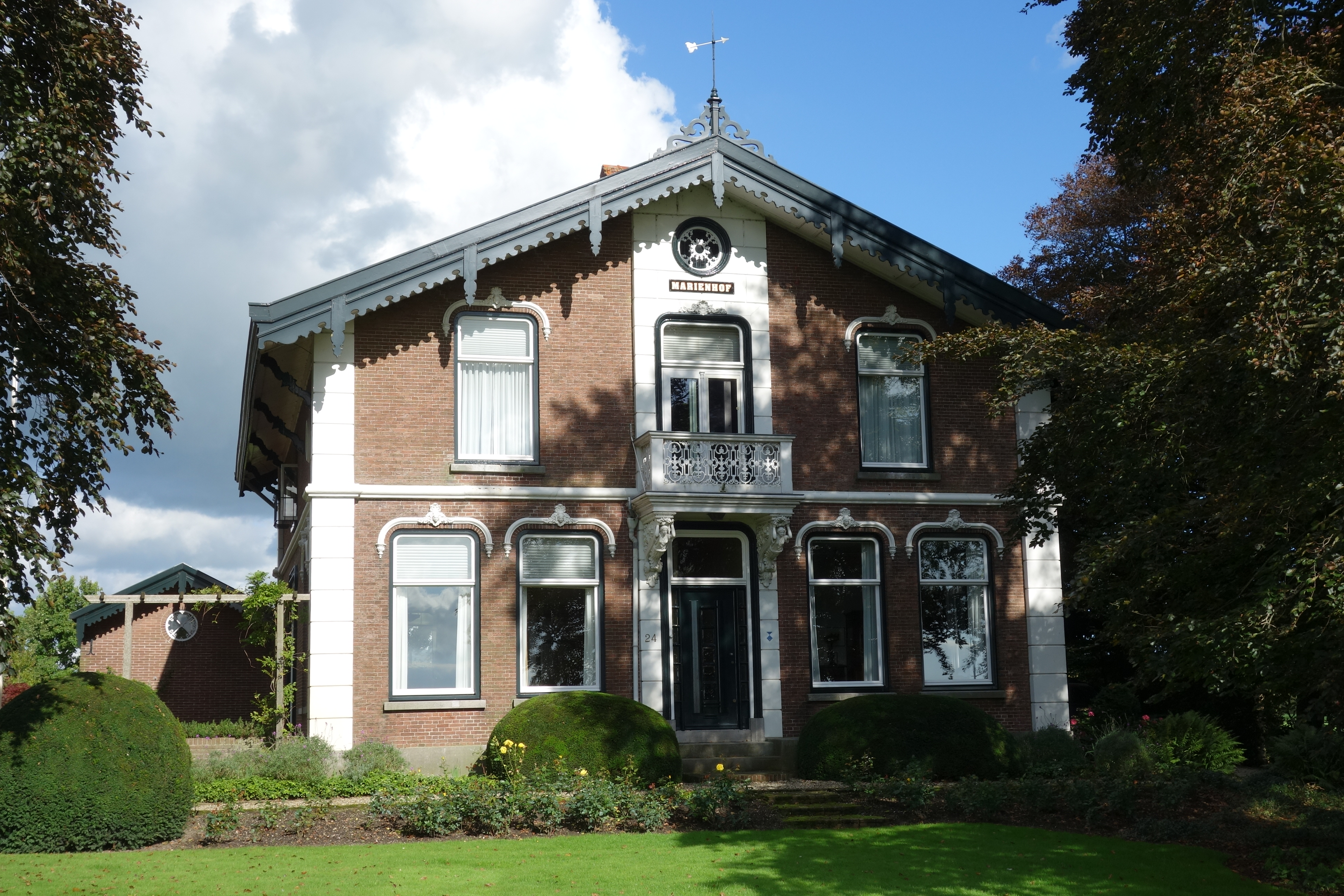
Former mayor's residence

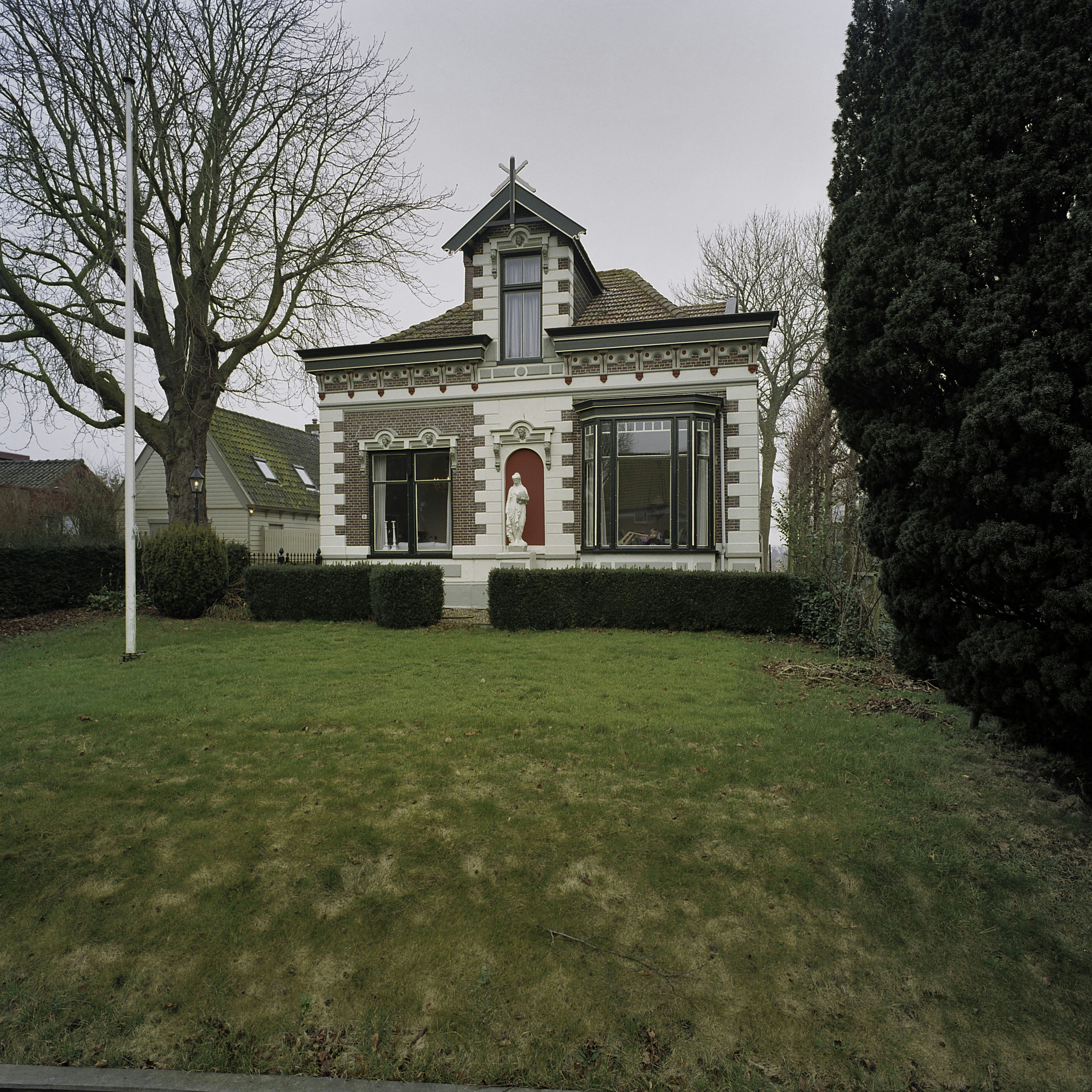
House in Midwoud
