= Otter (fishing device) =

Floating fishing device with a steering mechanism

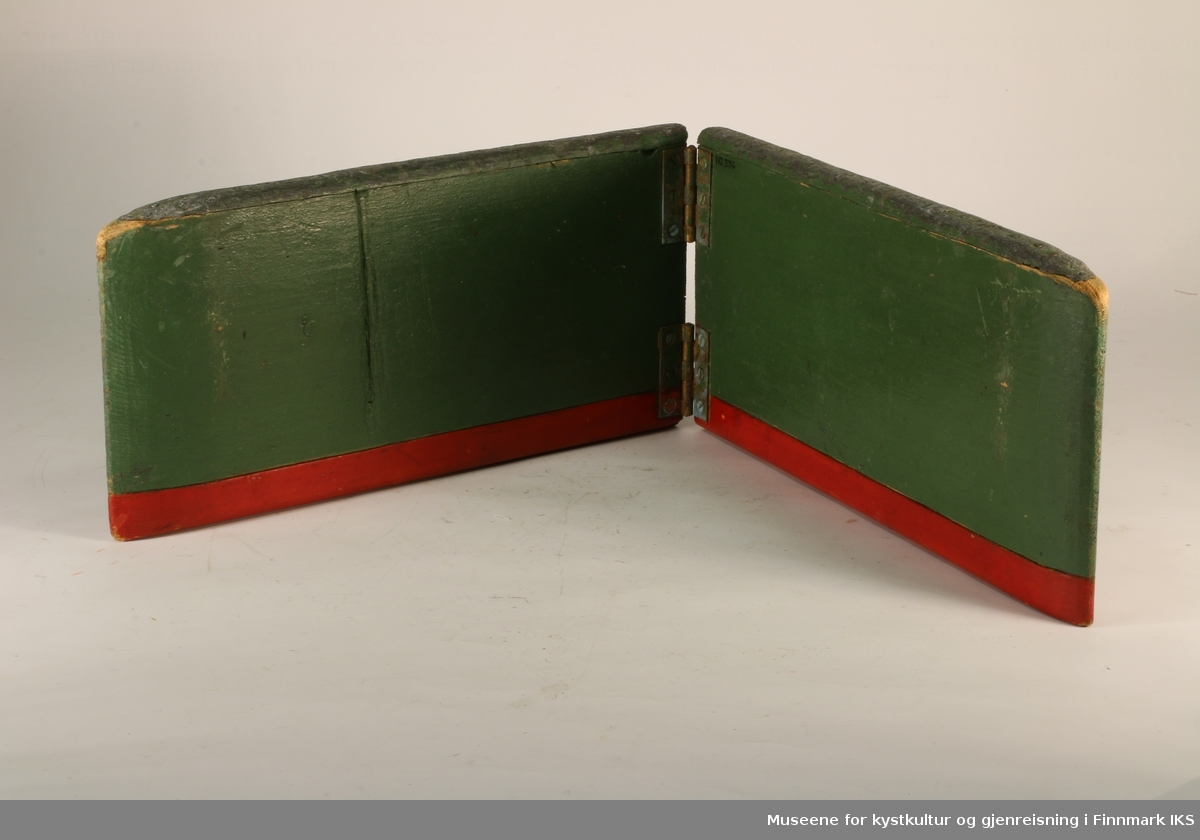
An otter board

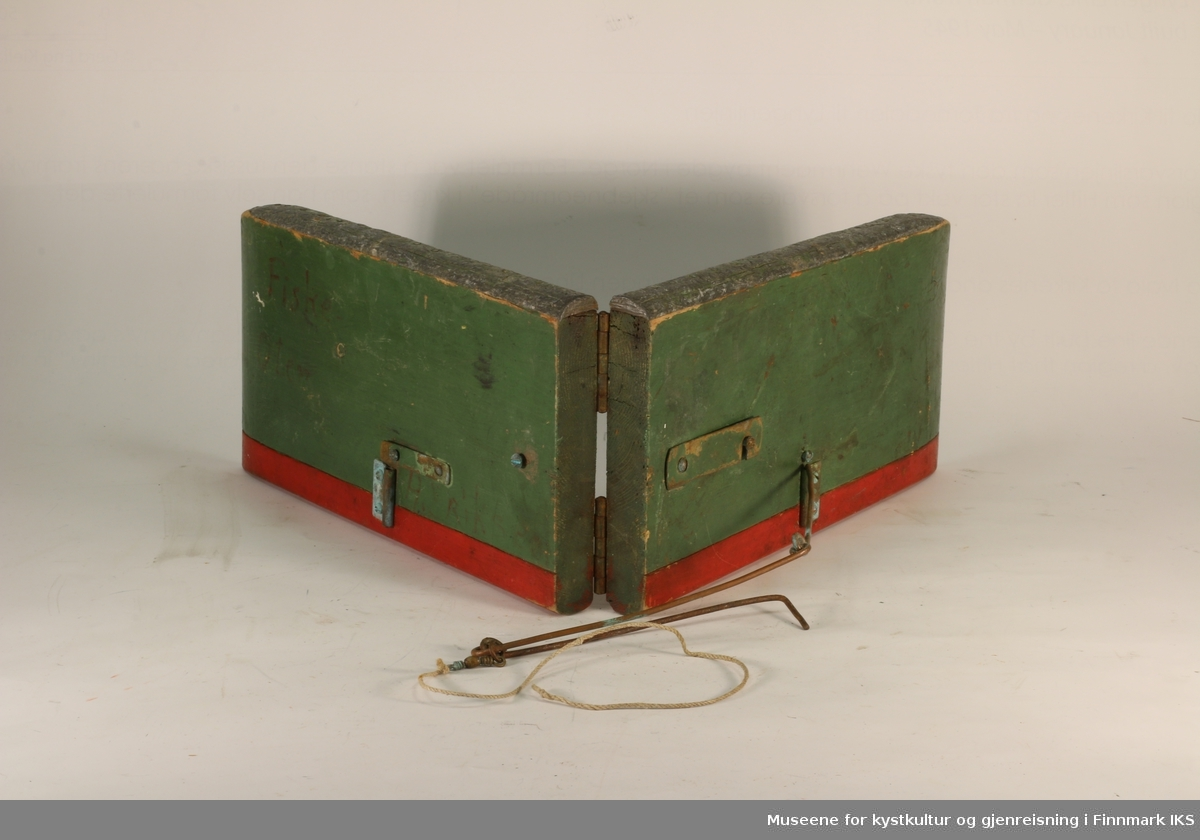
Front of the otter board

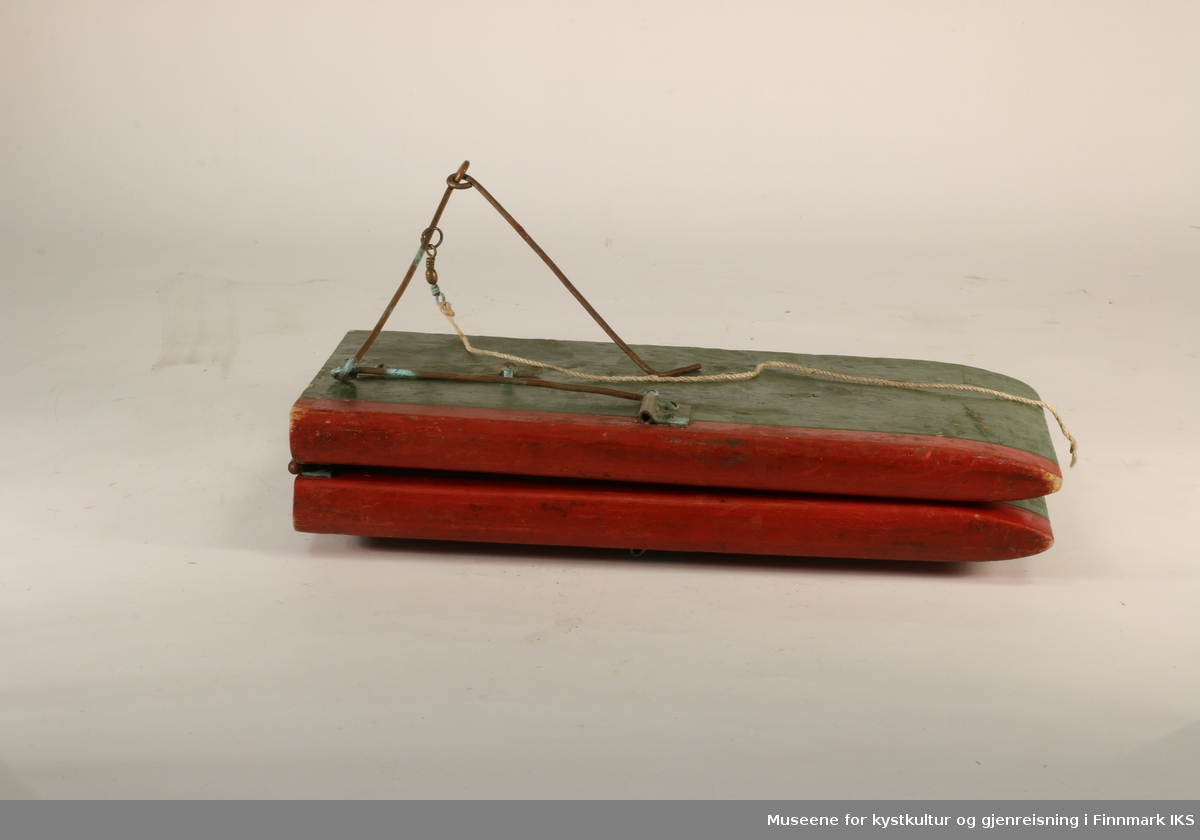
Folded otter board

The otter is a fishing device constructed with three parts. An otter board, a fishing line, and a steering mechanism. It may be used from a boat or pulled from the shore. The steering mechanism enables the fisherman to pull it away from the shore and steer it to the desired position. It was introduced into Norway by British anglers sometime around the middle of the nineteenth century. The first account of such a device is found in connection with Irish sports fishermen in 1855.

The otter may have multiple different designs. Otter boards used in bottom trawling are based on a similar design principle. The design takes advantage of the shearing effect achieved when the board is positioned at an oblique angle to the current. The effect is reminiscent of that of a kite in the wind. Different designs are found in Switzerland, the Nordic countries, California and Japan. Most commonly, the traditional board was made of wood and had a length about 2 ft (0.61 m), a width of 6 in (15 cm), and a width of less than 1 in (2.5 cm). To enable it to float in an upright position, it was equipped with metal weights made of lead or iron. The correct amount of weights allows the board to float with only 1–2 in (2.5–5.1 cm) above the surface. Snells, baited with flies or spoons are placed at intervals along the line. The snells would have different lengths due to the depth of which the line would float in the water. the longest snell would have been closest to the board, and the shortest closest to the fisherman.

In Britain, fishing with an otter was forbidden by the Salmon Fishery Act 1861; this may have been one of the reasons why British anglers introduced it to Norway. The first ban on the device in Norway was imposed in 1870 and it was increasingly forbidden throughout the end of the century.
