= De Held Jozua, Zaandam =

Paltrok mill in Zaandam, Netherlands

De Held Jozua
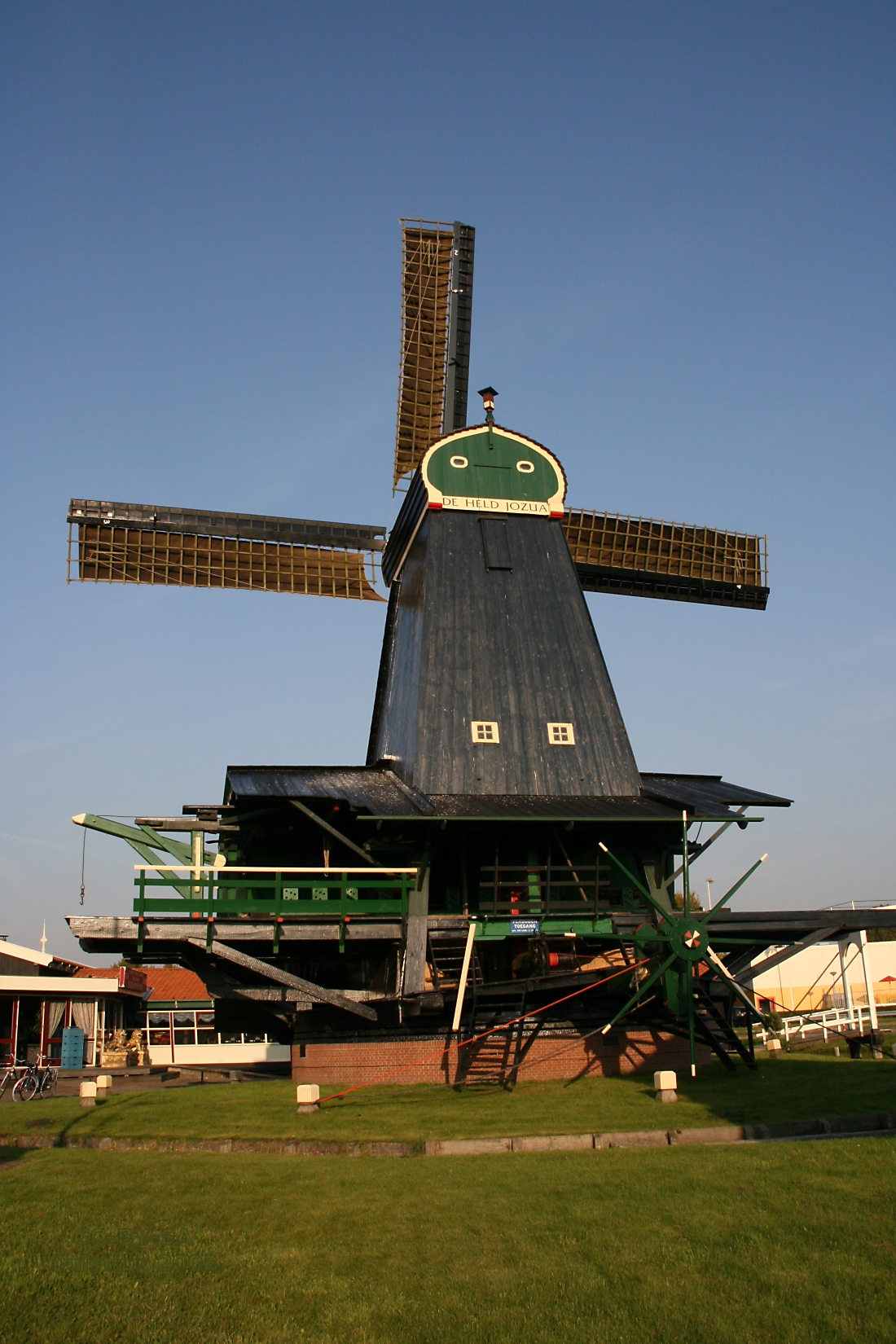
- De Held Jozua, 2008

Origin
- Mill name: De Held Jozua
- Mill location: Held Jozuapad 3 1507 ER Zaandam
- Coordinates: 52.443794°N 4.807006°E
- Operator(s): Stichting de Held Jozua
- Year built: 1719

Information
- Purpose: Sawmill
- Type: Paltrok mill
- No. of sails: Four sails
- Type of sails: Common sails
- Windshaft: Cast iron
- Winding: Tailpole and winch
- Other information: Three vertical frame saws

De Held Jozua (English: The Hero Joshua) is a paltrok mill in Zaandam, Netherlands which has been restored to working order. As all Dutch paltrok mills it is a wind-powered sawmill. The mill is listed as a Rijksmonument, number 40094.

== History ==
De Held Jozua was built in or shortly before 1719. The "windbrief" (letter of wind rights), dated 25 July 1719 was granted to Hendrik Claasz. de Boer. An insurance contract mentions a vicar called Gerardus van Aelst as owner in 1728, who may be the source of the biblical name of the mill. Over the years the windmill changes hands many times. Its working life ends with the construction of a mechanical sawmill in 1946. The windmill was at first still regularly being maintained but slowly fell into disrepair by the 1970s. The mill and accompanying drying sheds were finally restored in 1995. Since then it is regularly working while the sheds now house a restaurant.

== Description ==
De Held Jozua is a Dutch paltrok mill - a wooden mill supported on a short central post and a ring of wooden rollers on a low brick base and designed specifically for sawing wood. The mill body is boarded, however the sawing floor is open on three sides with only the windward facing side and the side roofs giving protection against the weather. The entire mill is winded by a tailpole and winch. On the front is a stage, 3.0 metres (9 ft 10 in) above ground for setting the sails. The sails are common sails with a span of 20.5 metres (67 ft 3 in). They are carried on a cast-iron windshaft cast by foundry Koninklijke Nederlandse Grofsmederij in 1904. The brake wheel with 72 cogs on the wind shaft drives the crank wheel with 27 cast iron radial cogs on the horizontal crank shaft. There is no upright shaft. The crank shaft has three crank pins. Connecting rods from the crank pins drive the three frame saws. Reciprocating lever bars also drive the pawl and ratchet mechanisms which in turn drive the winches and the feeding mechanism of the log carriages through rack and pinion mechanisms. The winches can be used with the log hoist to lift logs from the water onto the sawing platform and to pull the log carriages back to their starting position.

== Public access ==
The windmill is open to visitors when it is turning.
