= Zuidpoldermolen, Edam =

Zuidpoldermolen
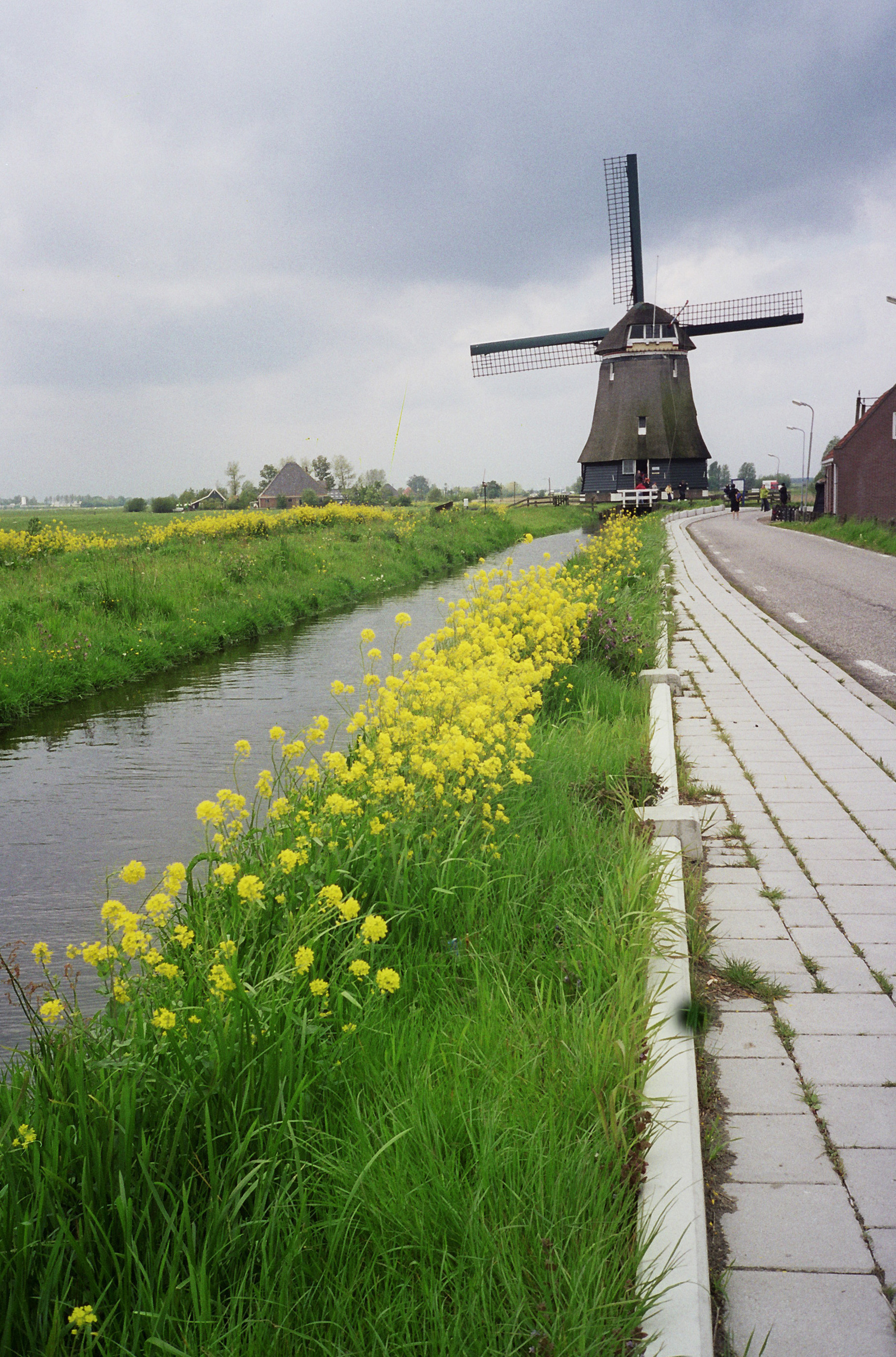
- Photographed by Els Bendheim, 2008
- Interactive map of Zuidpoldermolen
- 52.51056°N 5.05778°E
- Location: Edam

History
- Probably built: 1670

Site notes
- Height: 21,65 m

The Zuidpoldermolen is a windmill in Edam, dated between 1626-35 and was used to grind grain and drain a polder: low land that has been reclaimed from the sea and diked.

The mill is owned by the Dutch Windmill Society.

== Description ==
The Zuidpoldermolen is a thatched octagonal internal turning polder mill in Edam. The low, octagonal design categorizes it as a smock style, and the name translates to "south polder mill." The polder in 1875 has been supplemented by a steam screw pump.

== Public access ==
The wind-driven mechanics have been out of operation since 1949, and is closed to visitors.
