= Schoterveense Molen, Haarlem =

Windmill in Haarlem, Netherlands

Schoterveense Molen
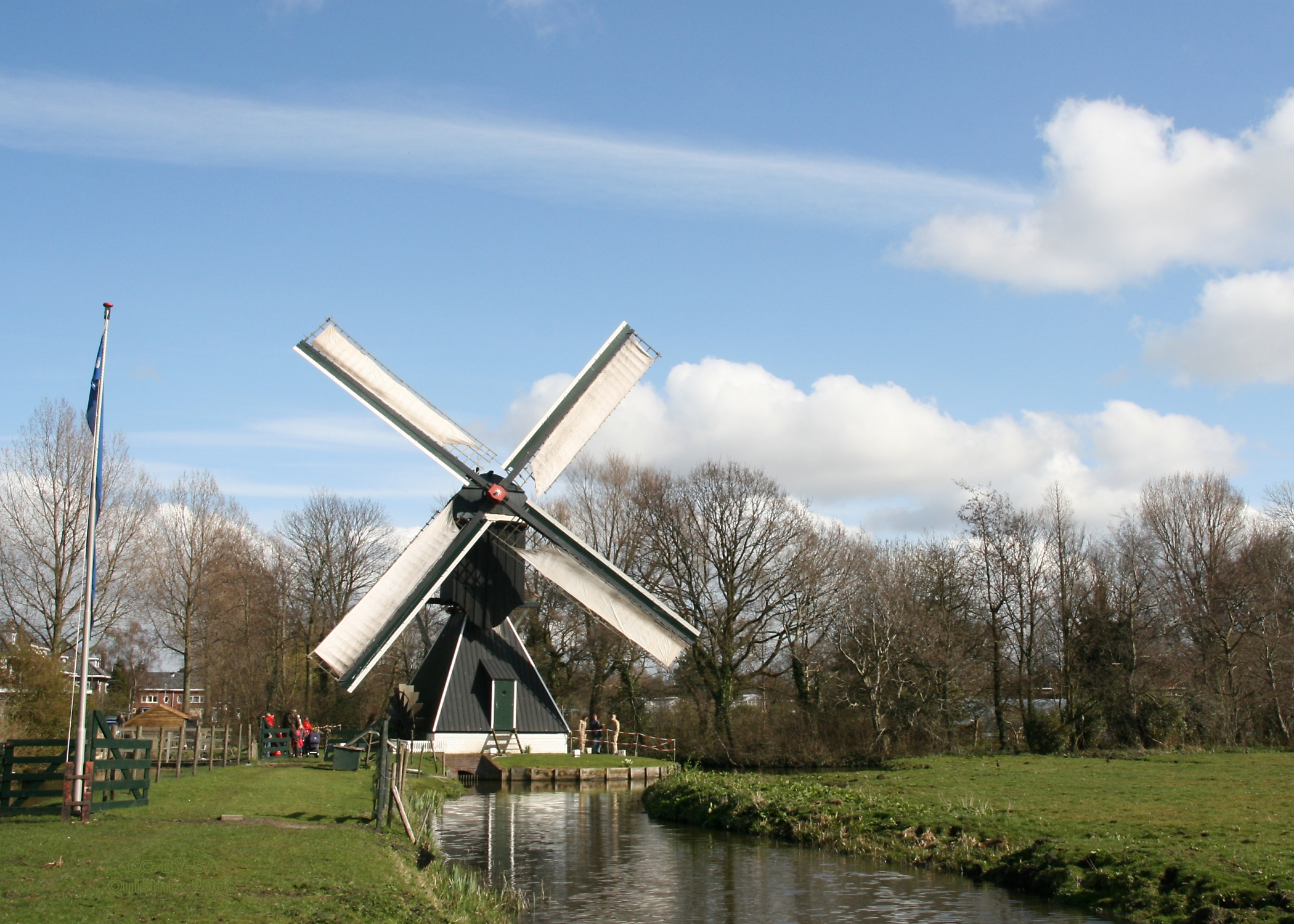

Origin
- Mill location: Haarlem
- Coordinates: 52°23′52.91″N 4°37′54.9″E
- Year built: probably before 1600

Information
- Purpose: Previously polder mill
- Smock sides: Four sides
- No. of sails: Four sails

Schoterveense Molen is a windmill in Haarlem located at Wipwatermolen Heussensstraat in the former municipality of Schoten. It is registered as a Rijksmonument.

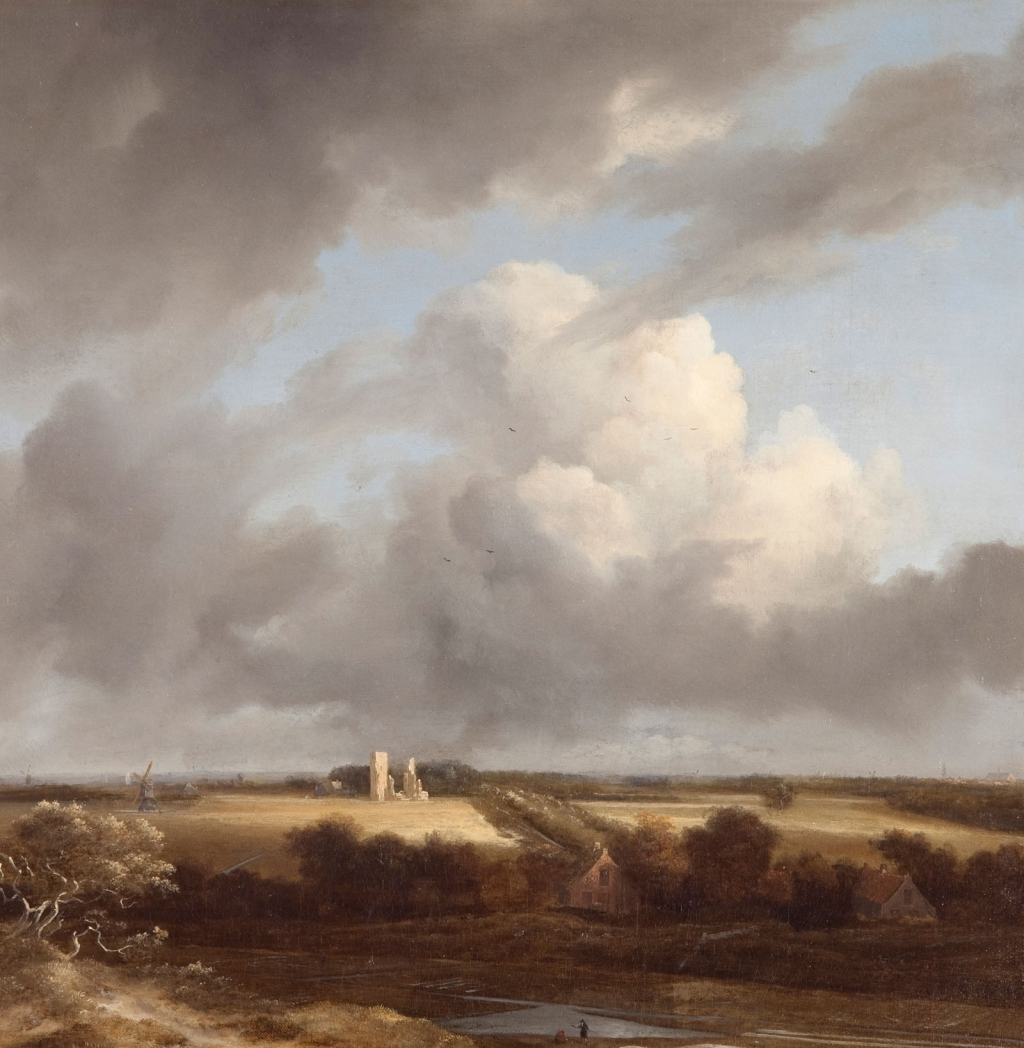
In this Jacob van Ruisdael painting of the ruins of Huis Ter Kleef, the Schoterveense Molen can be seen off to the left of the ruins. Beyond it the sails of boats on the Spaarne can be seen

This windmill stands as silent witness to the heritage of a defunct organization called Waterschap De Schoterveenpolder, that ended in 1935. A commemorative plaque was attached in 1891 by the last directors of that organization after some maintenance work was carried out. The polder was once over 206 hectares (510 acres), but has been reduced to half an acre due to surrounding city expansion. Between 1920 and 1923 its pumping function was transferred to an electric pumping station on the Delft canal further west. This made the mill redundant, which was necessary to strip it of its "wind rights" that prevented building expansion in the neighborhood.

It is situated quite close to the Huis ter Cleeff and was witness to the inquartering of the Spaniards under the Duke of Alva, which explains why the small canal next to it was called the Spanse-vaart and further towards the river Spaarne a street situated along the former route of the canal is called Spaansevaartstraat. Inspection in the 1950s brought to light some carpenters' marks in the foundations that go back to the 16th-century and as wipmolen De Stoop it was possibly built by the Spaniard troops during the siege of Haarlem.

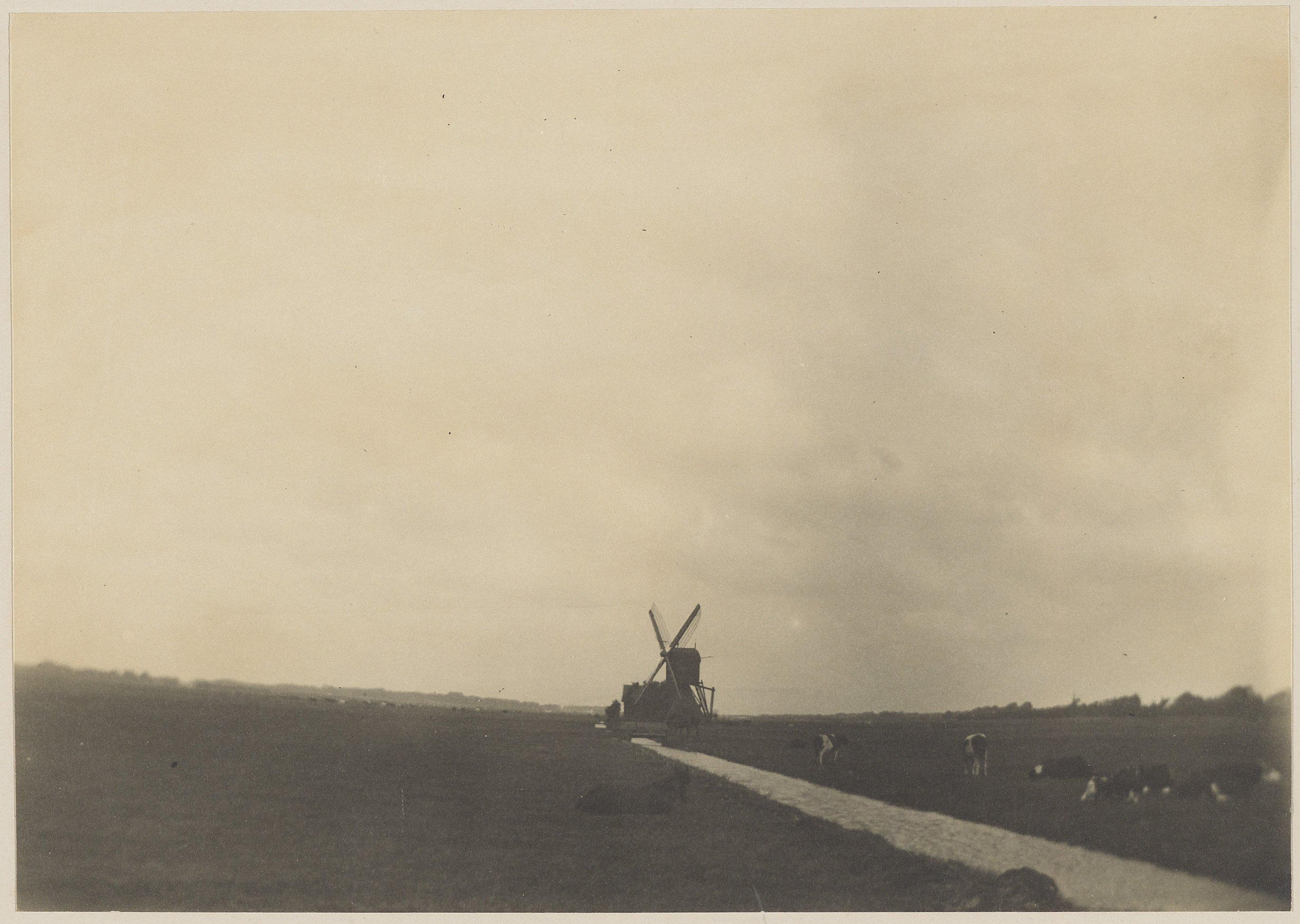
The mill in a still empty landscape in 1900

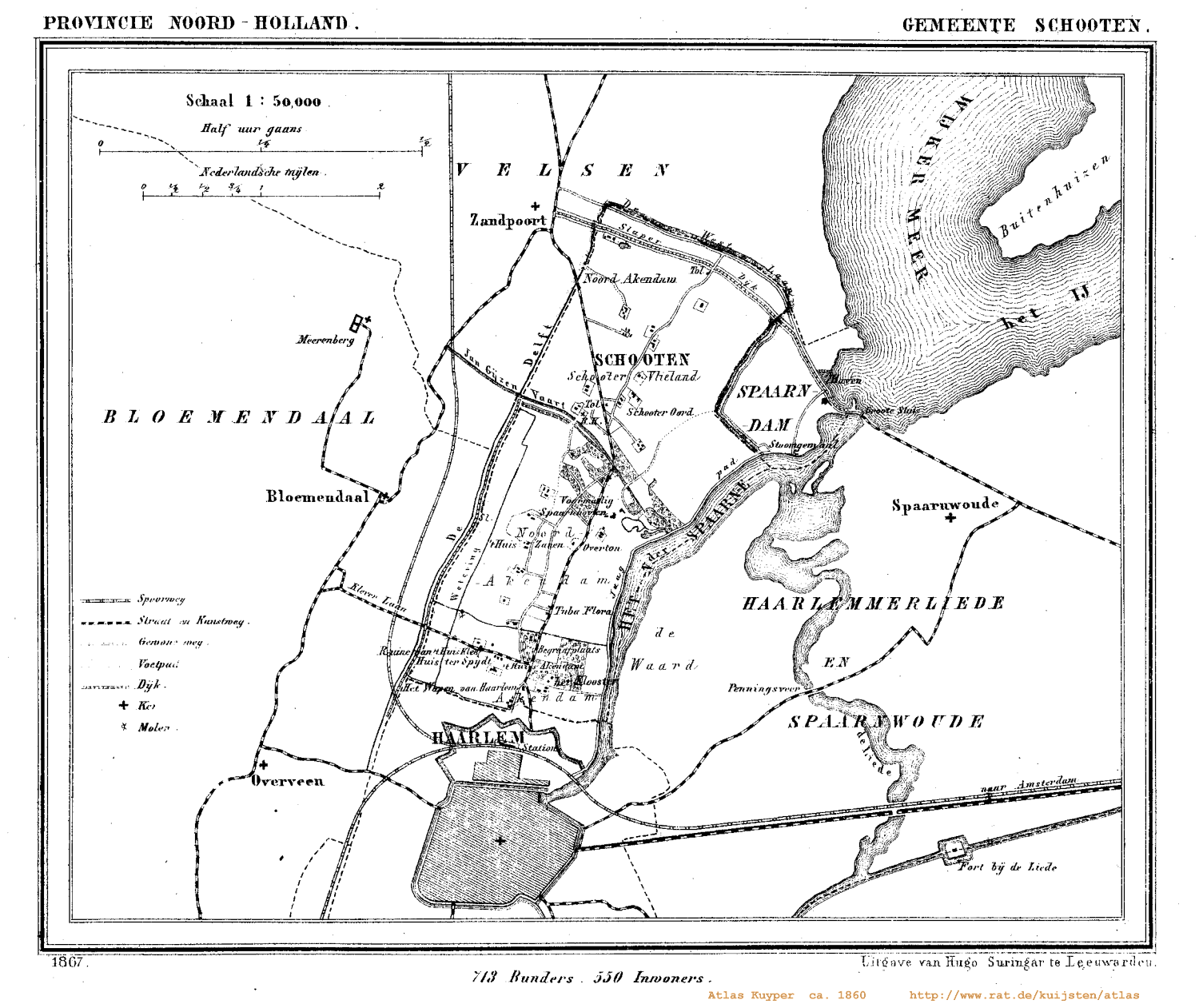
The mill at the junction of the Wetering and the Spaanse vaart can be seen above the Klever laan on this old map of Schoten from 1908
