= Landschap Noord-Holland =

Landschap Noord-Holland is a Dutch foundation which aims to protect the landscape, nature and cultural history of the province of North Holland by purchasing, arranging, managing, and developing nature reserves. It is one of twelve national Landschapsorganisaties (landscape organizations) that make up Landschapsbeheer Nederland.

Landschap Noord-Holland came about in 2003 as a merger between Noordhollandsch Landschap (1936) and Noord-Hollands Landschap. The foundation owns over 100 nature reserves with a combined area of 4,500 ha. The foundation has 4,000 volunteers and over 34,000 members. Landschap Noord-Holland is supported by a number of companies as well as the province of North Holand and the Nationale Postcode Loterij. In addition, (capital) funds contribute to projects. A sister organization is active in the Gooi, called Goois Natuurreservaat.
