= Stoomgemaal Vier Noorder Koggen =

Historical science museum and industrial heritage site in Medemblik, the Netherlands

Dutch Steam Museum
- Nederlands Stoommachinemuseum
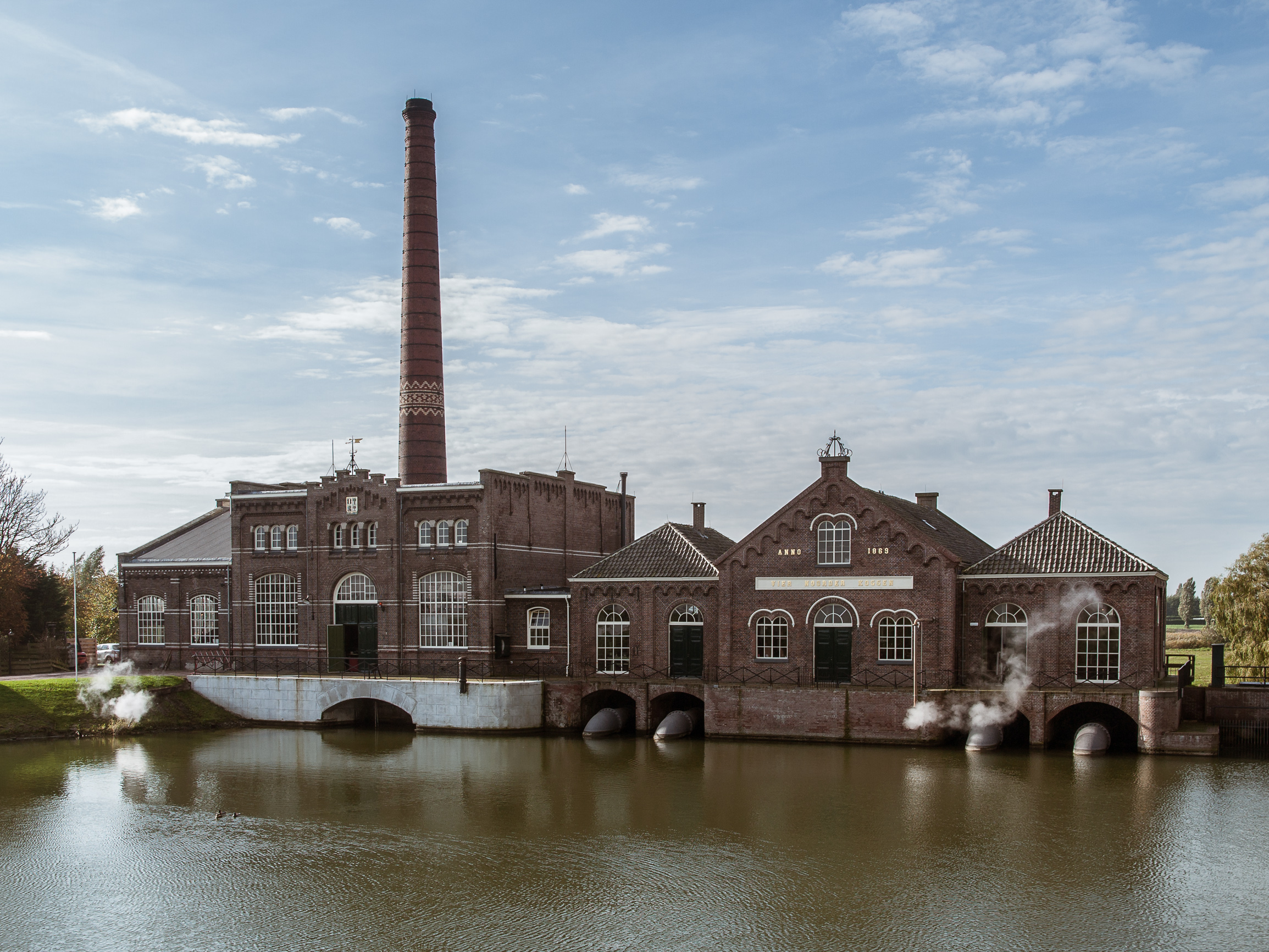

- Location within Netherlands
- Established: 1985
- Location: Oosterdijk 4; 1671 HJ Medemblik; Netherlands
- Coordinates: 52.760030°N 5.117735°E
- Type: Science museum Industrial heritage
- Website: Official website

The Dutch Steam Museum is a historical and science museum and former pumping station located on the IJsselmeer at Medemblik in the Netherlands. Constructed in 1869, the steam engines operated until the completion of an electric pumping station at Wervershoof in 1975. The museum is opened during the summer and tells the history of steam engines and the industrial revolution.
