= Otter (dinghy) =

Sailing dinghy

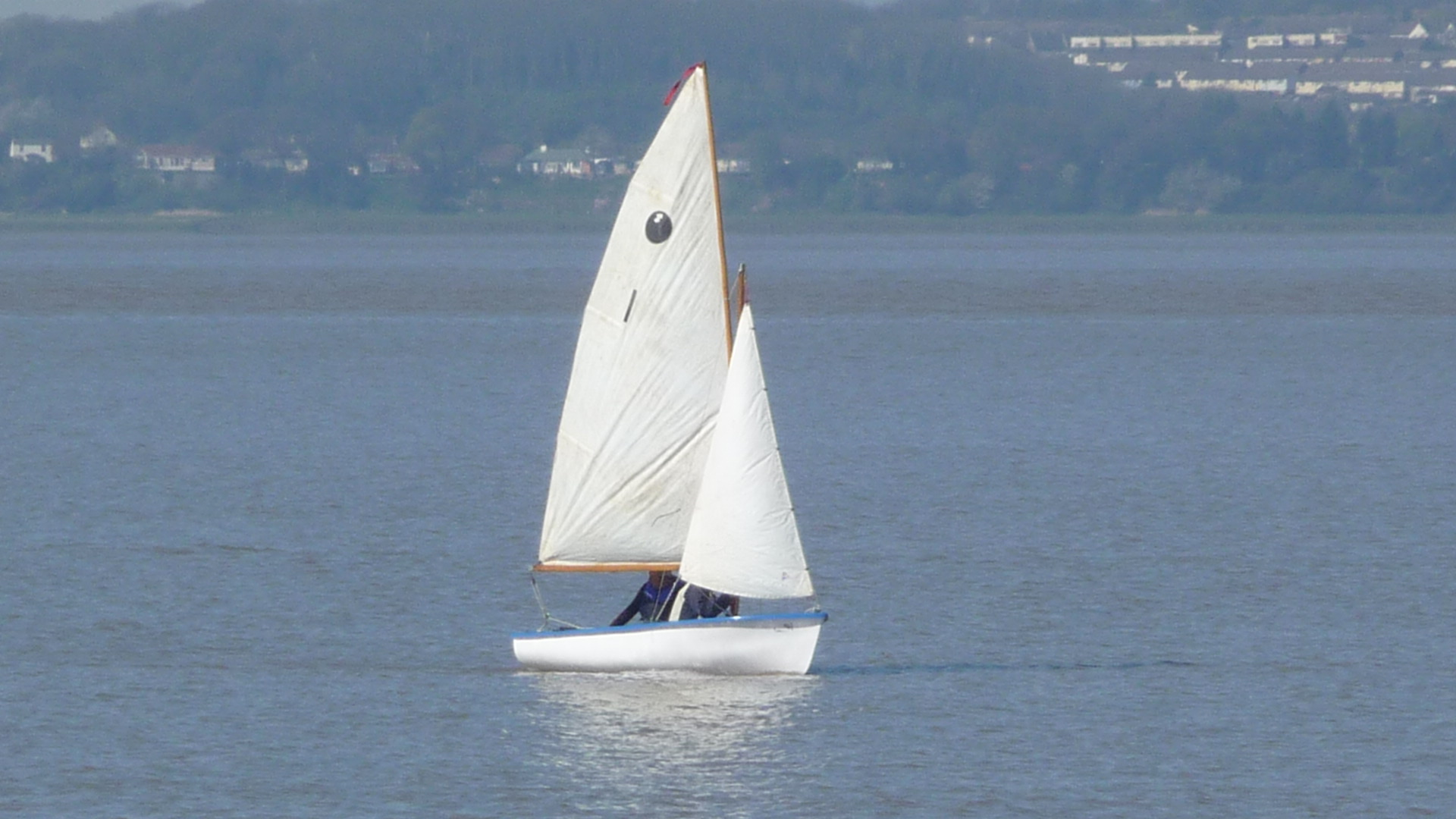

Boat
- Crew: 2
- Draft: 3 ft 6 in (1.07 m)

Hull
- Hull weight: 165 lb (75 kg)
- LOA: 11 ft 11 in (3.63 m)
- Beam: 4 ft 10 in (1.47 m)

Sails
- Mainsail area: 56 sq ft (5.2 m^{2})
- Jib/genoa area: 19 sq ft (1.8 m^{2})
- Spinnaker area: 70 sq ft (6.5 m^{2}).

Otter is a classification referring to a particular design for a two-man sailing dinghy with a glass fibre hull. Its rig consists of a main, a jib and an optional symmetric spinnaker. The hull dimensions are 11 feet 11 inches (3.63 m) in length and 4 ft 10 in (1.47 m) beam. The boat has a draft of 3 ft 6 in (1.07 m) with the centreboard down. The sail area (main and jib) is 75 sq ft (7.0 m^{2}). The class symbol is a stylised glass bubble; due to the original lightweight "cigar box cedar" construction of the prototypes, the name 'Bubble' was first used for the boat. John Baker obtained the plans for an expanded version of the boat in G.R.P. and hence renamed the boat 'Glass Bubble'. After being put into production by Baker, the name 'Otter' was adopted; coming from the river of the same name in East Devon, close to where the boat was manufactured.

The Otter also handles well and can be sailed with larger crews than the two man racing crew. The boats are also incredibly easy to sail single handed as well. However, when sailing with more than two people the boat does tend to sit quite low in the water and does affect the performance of the dinghy.

The Otter was originally designed by George O'Brien Kennedy for G.R.P. Moulding, and was first produced in the mid-1960s by John Baker, Kenton Forge Ltd. The production was moved at least once, with later boats being produced by Chris Clarance Marine, Shaldon, Devon. The boats were produced for at least 22 years, with at least 1173 boats being produced.

The last Otter dinghies were built by Mark Giles and bore sail numbers up to and including 1201. Some of the later Otters were built with a retracting bowsprit and stub spinnaker chute for use with an asymmetric spinnaker launched out of a bag lying on the foredeck. These later boats bore a CE mark, which was not used on boats built in the UK until about 2003, so the Otters were being built at least up to that date.

The Otter dinghy was marketed as a do-everything dinghy; the sales brochure describes the boat as both competitive, as well as being "Ideal for the young and not so young". It is further described as rowing well, and being suited to a small outboard engine. The boat was supplied with an additional thwart and rowlocks for use when under power and rowing.

Several versions of the Otter were manufactured. The original design consisted of a single skin glass fibre hull and a Gunter rig (without spinnaker). Later models used the more successful Bermudan rig (with optional spinnaker), and a double skinned 'unsinkable' hull with integrated buoyancy tanks. The hull weight and sail area depend on the version. The adjacent picture shows the original wooden masted Gunter sailplan.

The otter dinghy no longer appears in the official Portsmouth Yardstick List., however, during production it had a PY of 134, placing it similar to but slightly fast than the Topper with a PY of 136. According to Noblemarine, the Otter has a PN of 1275, but this source of this information is unknown and may be unreliable since the other dimensions quoted are contradictory to the manufacturer's description. In 2007 the RYA also quoted the Otters PN as 1275 but have since removed the boat from the list.
