= Oostwoud =

- Village
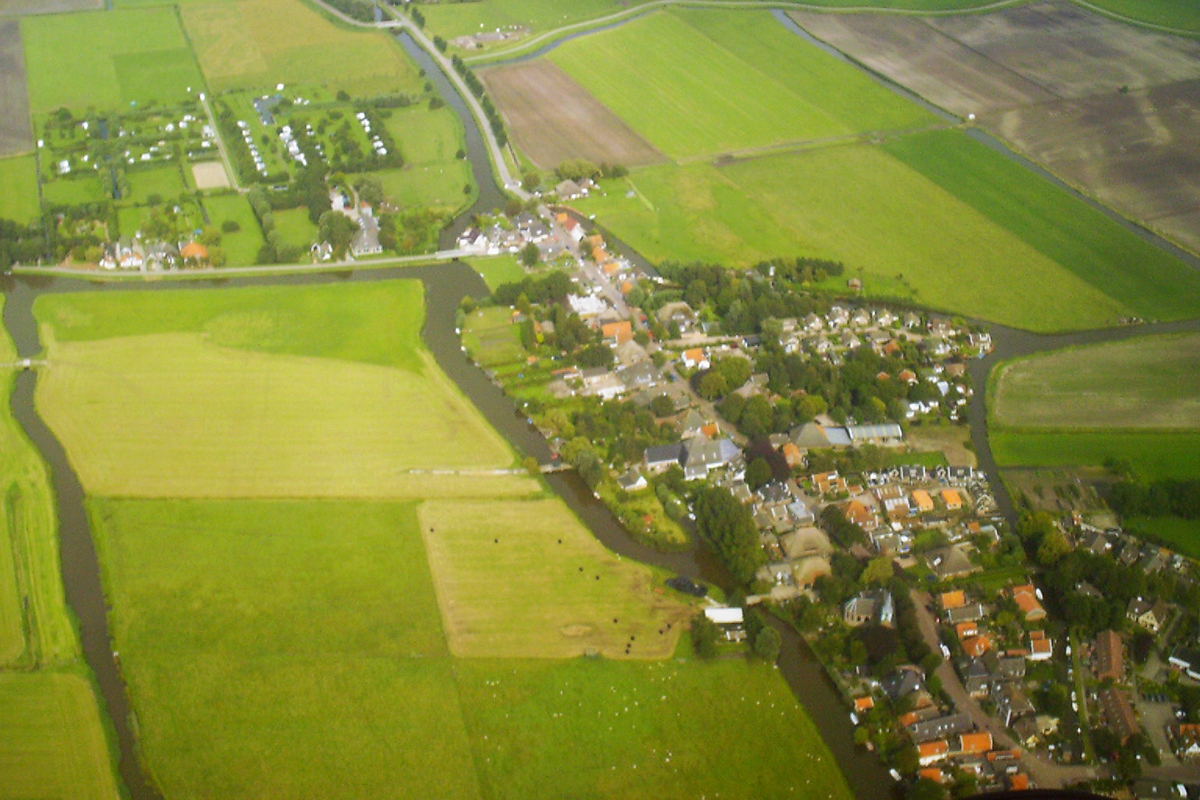
- Aerial view

- Location in the Netherlands Location in the province of North Holland in the Netherlands
- Coordinates: 52°44′N 5°5′E
- Country: Netherlands
- Province: North Holland
- Municipality: Medemblik

Area
  - Village: 9.67 km^{2} (3.73 sq mi)
- Elevation: −1.3 m (−4.3 ft)

Population (2025)
  - Village: 875
  - Density: 90.5/km^{2} (234/sq mi)
  - Urban: 680
  - Rural: 195
- Time zone: UTC+1 (CET)
  - Summer (DST): UTC+2 (CEST)
- Postal code: 1678
- Dialing code: 0229

Oostwoud is a village in the Dutch province of North Holland. It is a part of the municipality of Medemblik, and lies about 8 km north of Hoorn.

== History ==
The village was first mentioned around 1312 as Oestenwoude, and means "eastern forest". Oost (east) has been added to distinguish from Midwoud and Nibbixwoud. Oostwoud developed in the Late Middle Ages as a peat excavation settlement. A large part of the village burnt down in 1710 due to arson.

The Dutch Reformed church is a single aisled church with wooden ridge turret built in 1753. The church was expanded around 1875.

Oostwoud was home to 310 people in 1840. In 1878, a joint railway station with Midwoud opened on the Hoorn to Medemblik railway line. The line closed in 1941.

== Gallery ==
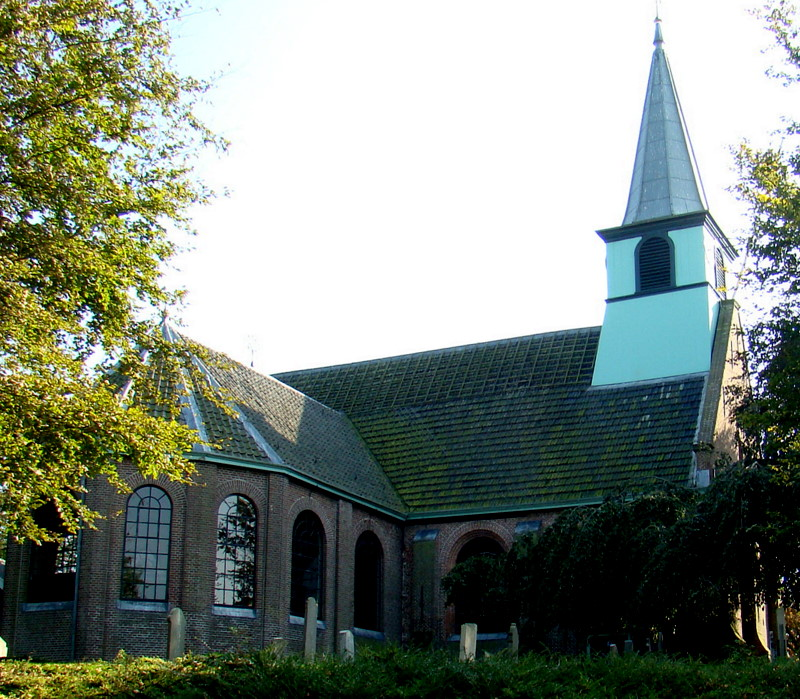
Dutch Reformed church

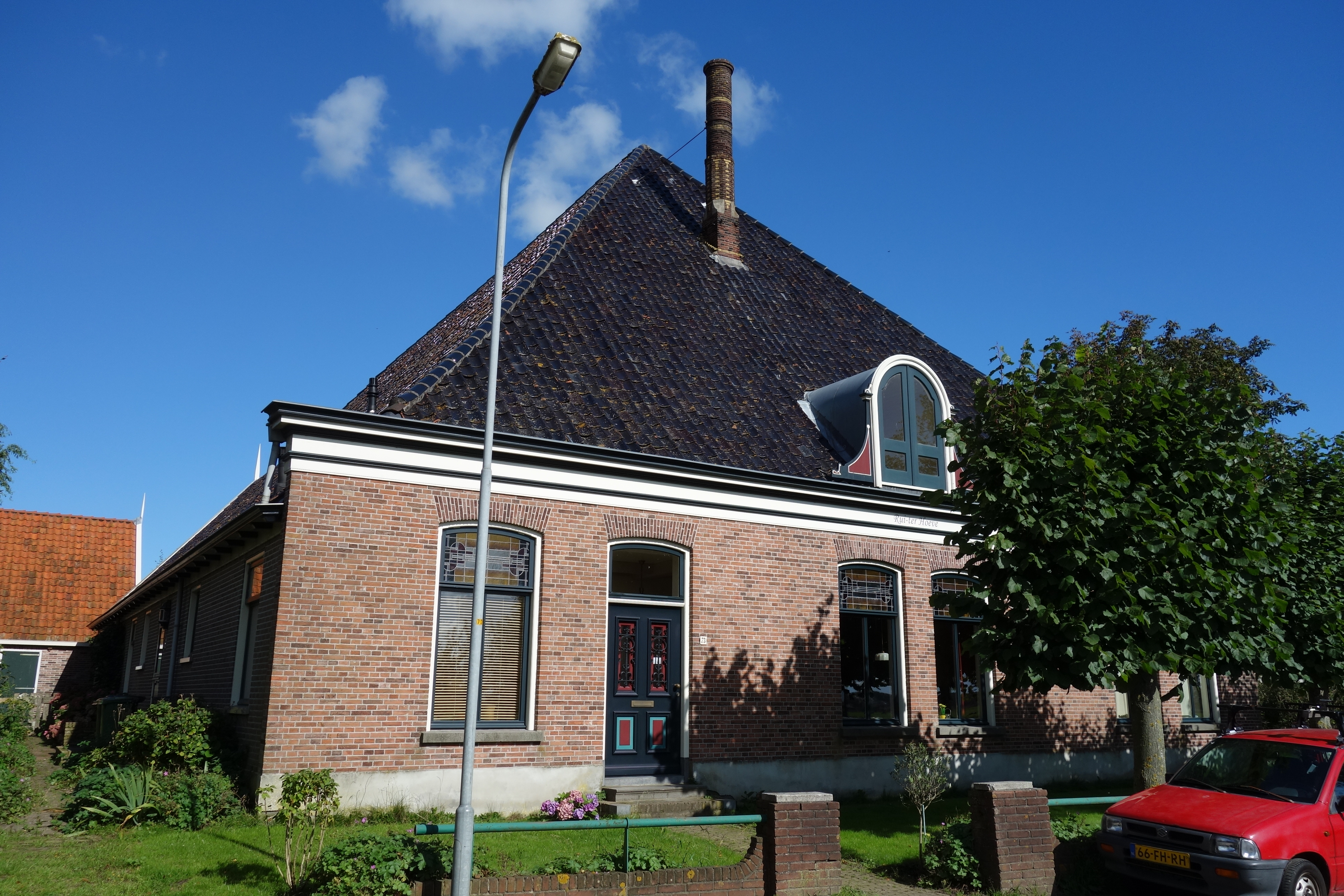
Farm in Oostwoud
