= Otter, Ontario =

Otter
- Dispersed Rural Community
- Location in Ontario
- Coordinates: 46°44′38″N 79°31′21″W
- Country: Canada
- Province: Ontario
- District: Nipissing
- Geographic Township: Gooderham
- Elevation: 315 m (1,033 ft)
- Time zone: UTC-5 (Eastern Time Zone)
  - Summer (DST): UTC-4 (Eastern Time Zone)

Otter is a dispersed rural community and unincorporated place in geographic Gooderham Township, Nipissing District, Northeastern Ontario, Canada. It was created during the construction of the Ontario Northland Railway in the early 20th century. Otter is located on the railway line between the railway points of Bushnell to the north and Diver to the south. Otter Lake to the west takes its name from the dispersed rural community of Otter.
