= Penninga's Molen, Joure =

Windmill in Joure, Netherlands

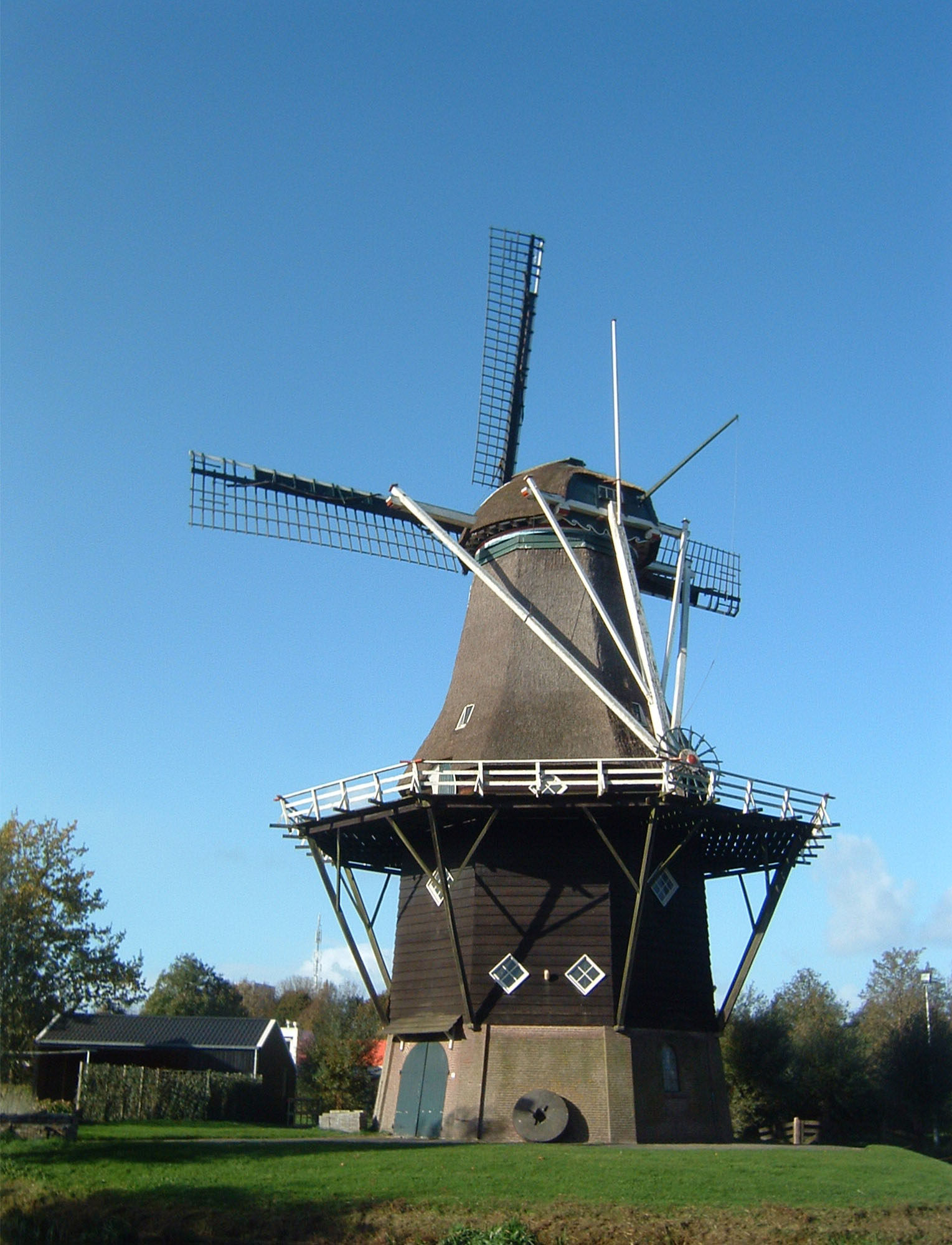
- Penninga's Molen, October 2006

Origin
- Mill name: Penninga's Molen
- Mill location: Tolhûswei 12 A, 8501 ZR, Joure
- Coordinates: 52°58′22″N 5°47′20″E
- Operator(s): Stichting Penninga's Molen
- Year built: 1900

Information
- Purpose: Corn mill
- Type: Smock mill
- Storeys: Three-storey smock
- Base storeys: Three-storey base
- Smock sides: Eight sides
- No. of sails: Four sails
- Type of sails: Common sails
- Windshaft: Cast iron
- Winding: Tailpole and winch
- No. of pairs of millstones: Three pairs of millstones
- Size of millstones: 1.50 metres (4 ft 11 in) diameter

Penninga's Molen (English: Penninga's Mill) or De Jonge Wester is a smock mill in Joure, Friesland, Netherlands which was built in 1900 and is working for trade. It is also used as a training mill. The mill is listed as a Rijksmonument, number 20842.

== History ==
The mill was originally built in 1692 at Westzaan, North Holland by millwright Jelis Hendricksz. At Westzaan, it was originally a paper mill known as De Jong Dolfijn (English: The Young Dolphin or De Koperen Berg (English: The Copper Mountain). In 1819, the mill was converted to a barley mill, later also being used for milling rice. In 1900, the mill was sold for demolition. It was dismantled and shipped across the Zuiderzee to Joure by millwright Jelmer Visser of Heerenveen. The mill had been bought by miller Auke Sietzes Penninga to replace the smock mill De Westenberg, which had burnt down on 13 April 1900. The new mill was named De Jonge Wester but was known locally as Penninga's Molen. It worked until 1936, or 1938. It is said to have been worked occasionally during the Second World War, but was otherwise used as stables. By the 1960s, the mill was derelict. The Stichting de Penninga's Molen (English: Penninga's Mill Society) was established in 1966. It purchased Penninga's Molen in 1970 for ƒ1. In 1970–71, the mill was restored by millwright Y Schakel of Exmorra. During the restoration, the windshaft from the Rijperpoldermolen, Ryptsjerk was fitted. This mill had burnt down on 2 June 1968. The windshaft originally in Penninga's Molen is now fitted to Sint Annamolen, Nijmegen, Gelderland. The mill was officially opened on 10 May 1972 by Commissioner to the Queen H Rijpstra. The mill serves as a training mill for the Gild Fryske Mounders (English: Guild of Frisian Millers'). On 7 July 2000, the mill was dressed overall in the Zaanse style, in celebration of its Zaan origins and the centenary of its erection in Joure. A further restoration of the mill was undertaken in 2007. The stage was rebuilt, and the cap removed from the mill to allow it to be completely rethatched.

== Description ==
Penninga's Molen is what the Dutch describe as a "stellingmolen" . It is a three-storey smock mill on a three-storey base. The bottom storey of the base is of brick, with the upper two storeys being a wood-framed structure. The stage is at second-floor level, 9.10 metres (29 ft 10 in) above ground level. The smock and cap are thatched. The mill is winded by tailpole and winch. The sails are Common sails. They have a span of 23.54 metres (77 ft 3 in). The sails are carried on a cast-iron windshaft, which was cast by De Munck Keizer of Martenshoek, Groningen. The windshaft also carries the brake wheel, which has 53 cogs. This drives the wallower (30 cogs) at the top of the upright shaft. At the bottom of the upright shaft, the great spur wheel, which has 133 cogs. The great spur wheel drives two pairs of 1.50 metres (4 ft 11 in) diameter Cullen millstones via lantern pinion stone nuts which has 29 staves each. A pair of 1.50 metres (4 ft 11 in) diameter French Burr millstones is driven via a lantern pinion stone nut which has 29 staves.

== Millers ==
- Auke Sietzes Penninga (1900-36 or 38)

References for above:-

== Public access ==
Penninga's Molen is open to the public on Saturdays between 09:00 and 12:00 and at other times by appointment.
