= Vier Noorder Koggen =

Former amt and water board in the Netherlands

The four amts of West-Friesland, ca. 1750

Vier Noorder Koggen, also known as Hoogwouder, is a former amt and water board in the Netherlands, in the province of North Holland. The most important town within it was Medemblik.
