= Westfriese Omringdijk =

Dyke protecting Westflinge

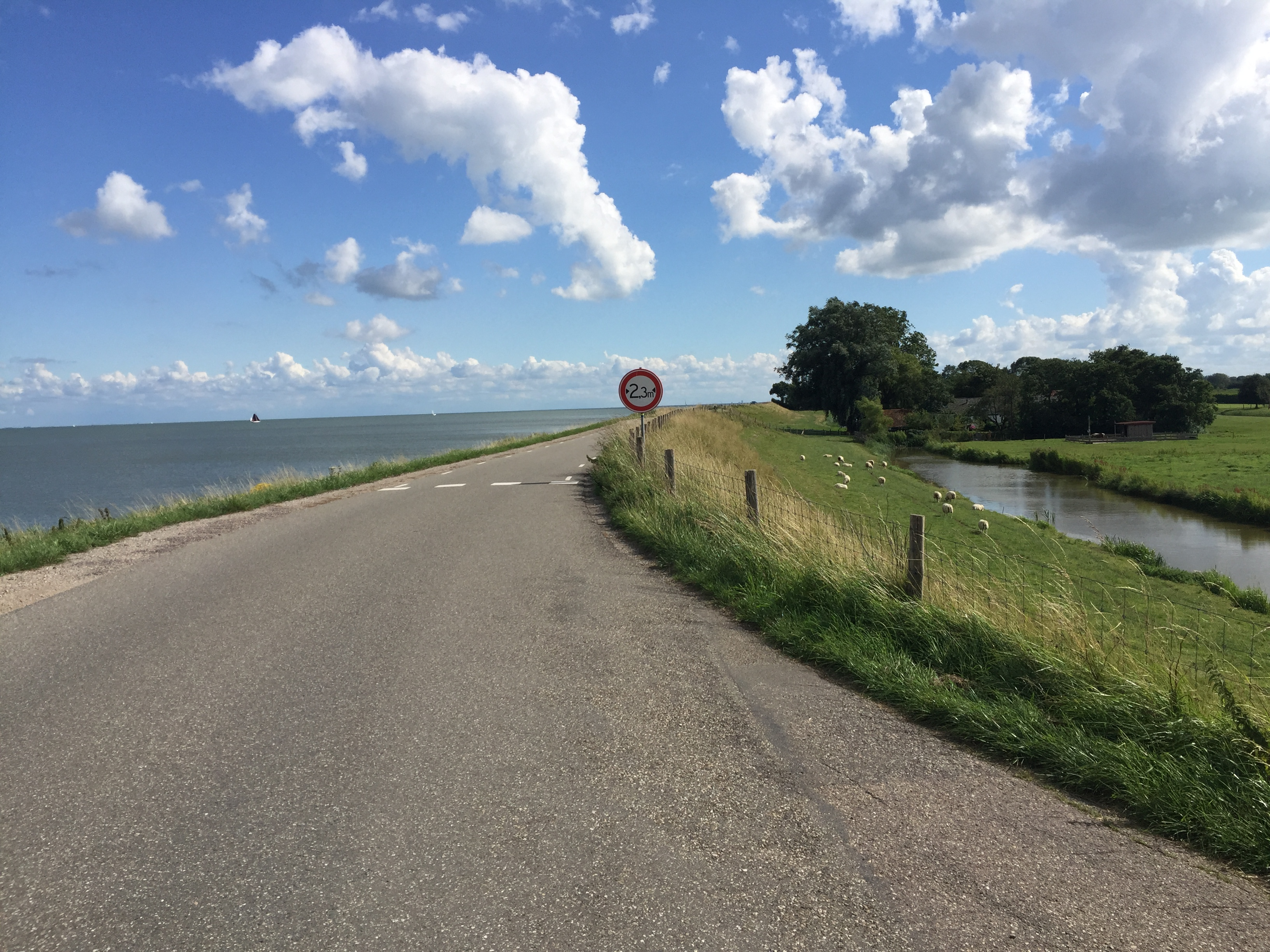
Westfriese Omringdijk in 2020

The Westfriese Omringdijk (West-Frisian Circular Dyke) is a dyke system that protected the region of Westflinge, part of the historical region of West-Frisia. Westflinge is now commonly referred to as West-Frisia as the rest of historical West-Frisia assimilated with The Netherlands.

The cultivation of peat bogs and moors as of 1000 BC led to subsidence, which necessitated the building of dykes. The Westfriese Omringdijk was formed by connecting a large number of smaller dykes. This was completed by 1250 AD, just in time for the area to be spared annihilation in the St. Lucia's flood of 1287. The total dyke length is about 126 km, protecting an area of about 800 km^{2}. It connects the cities of Enkhuizen, Hoorn, Alkmaar, Schagen, Medemblik and then back to Enkhuizen.

== Sources ==
- Westfriese OmringDaik Sait
- http://watercanon.nederlandleeftmetwater.nl/view/canon/dykeconstruction%5B‍%5D
