= De Otter, Amsterdam =

Windmill in Amsterdam, Netherlands

De Otter
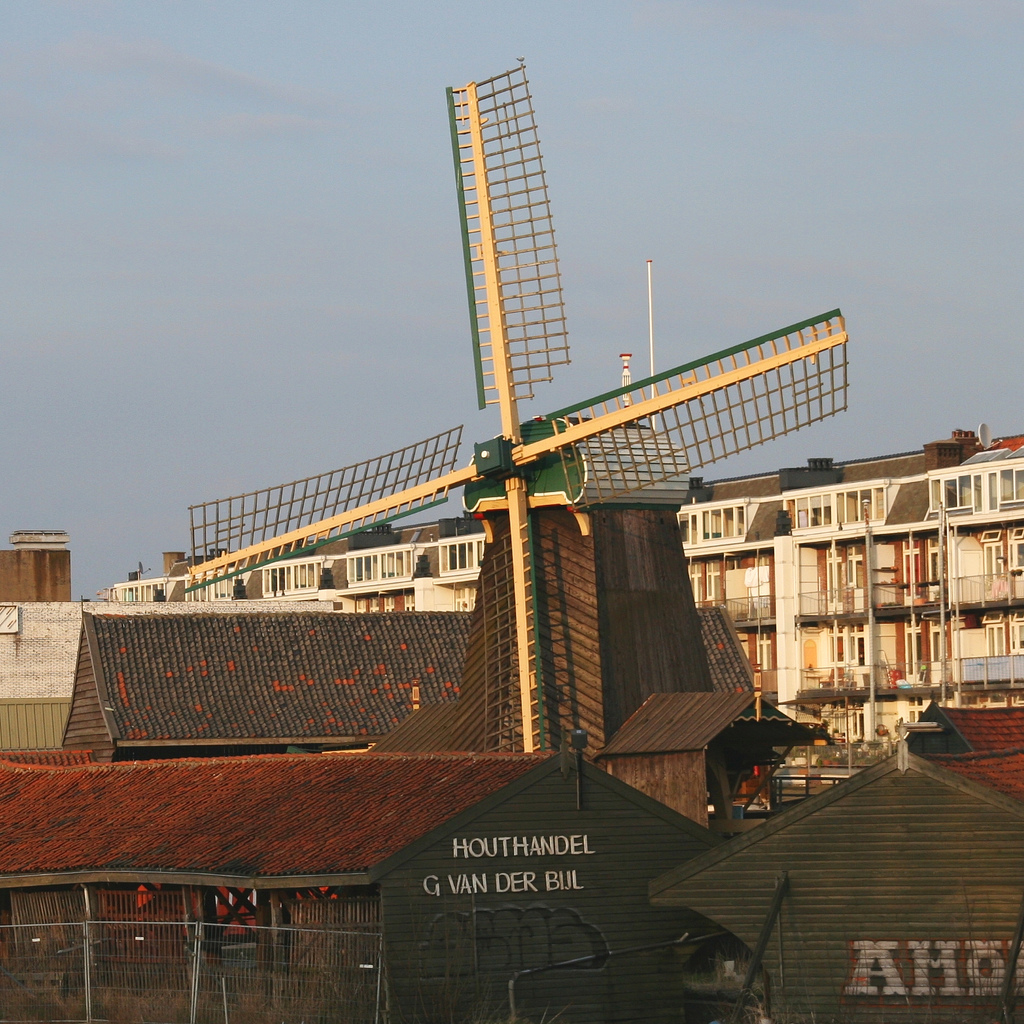
- De Otter, 2007

Origin
- Mill name: De Otter
- Mill location: Gillis van Ledenberchstraat 78 1052 VK Amsterdam
- Coordinates: 52.376179°N 4.870907°E
- Operator(s): Stichting Houtzaagmolen De Otter
- Year built: 1631

Information
- Purpose: Sawmill
- Type: Paltrok mill
- No. of sails: Four sails
- Type of sails: Common sails
- Windshaft: Wood
- Winding: Tailpole and winch
- Other information: Three vertical frame saws

De Otter (Dutch pronunciation: [də ˈʔɔtər]) is a paltrok mill in Amsterdam, Netherlands which has been restored to working order. As all Dutch paltrok mills it is a wind-powered sawmill. The mill is listed as a Rijksmonument, number 1198.

== History ==
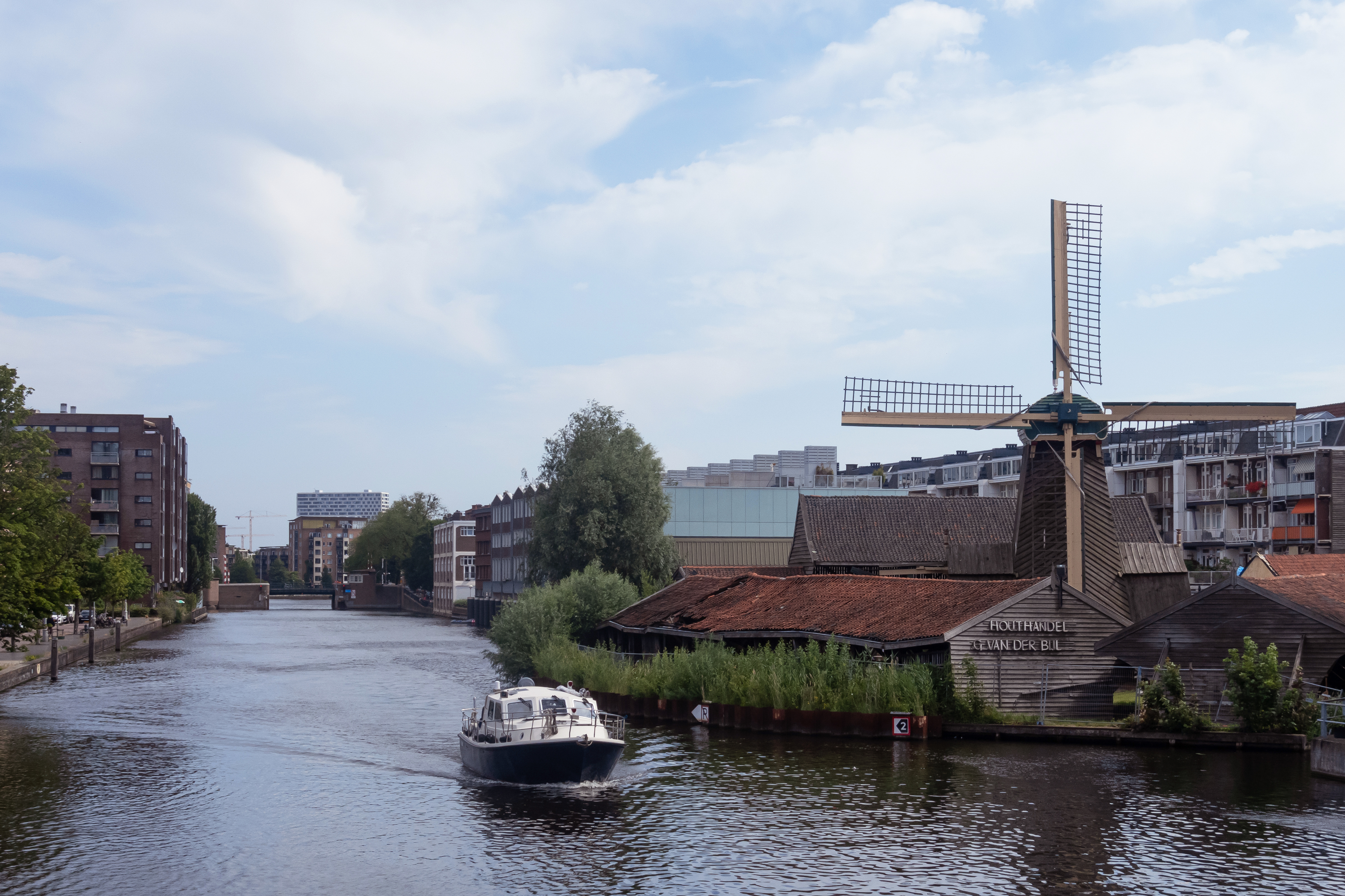
Houtzaagmolen de Otter

De Otter, probably earlier known as De Kleine Otter (The Small Otter) was built in or shortly after 1631. It is the only one left over from a group of sawmills built in the area between the Kostverlorenvaart canal and the Singelgracht. Gerrit van der Beyl bought the mill in 1817. The firm Van der Beyl expanded their property by acquiring several neighboring sawmills. City expansion started to threaten the mills by the end of the 19th century and during several decades the mills were one by one dismantled. De Otter was probably in production until the start of the 20th century. In 1925 the sails were removed after the wooden windshaft was torn but the rest of the mill remained standing. The last operational wind powered sawmill, De Eenhoorn (The Unicorn), located north of De Otter, shut down in 1929 and was dismantled in 1931, leaving De Otter as the only remainder of this local industry. De Otter was placed on the list of monuments in 1977. The mill was restored to working order after a two-year restoration project started in 1994 after which it was regularly running. However the location of the mill for catching the wind was already difficult in the buildup area of Amsterdam and it got worse by the construction of large apartment buildings close to the windmill. Stichting Houtzaagmolen De Otter, as owner of the mill, therefore proposed to move the mill to Uitgeest. However the local government had to give permission to move a Rijksmonument and it turned out the local city council was strongly opposed to this idea. The fierce discussion became the subject of several court cases between 2006 and 2011. For the time being De Otter is still in its original location but not being operated.

== Description ==
De Otter is a Dutch paltrok mill - a wooden mill supported on a short central post and a ring of wooden rollers on a low brick base and designed specifically for sawing wood. The mill body is boarded, however the sawing floor is open on three sides with only the windward facing side and the side roofs giving protection against the weather. The entire mill is winded by a tailpole and winch. On the front is a stage, 2.80 metres (9 ft 2 in) above ground for setting the sails. The sails are common sails with a span of 19.50 metres (64 ft 0 in). They are carried on Azobé wooden windshaft made by Saendijck in 1996. The function of the brake wheel is split between two wheels, one wheel with a flat outer rim for the brake blocks to work on and another wheel with 71 radial cogs driving the lantern wheel with 29 staves on the horizontal crank shaft. There is no upright shaft. Connecting rods from the three cranks drive the three wooden sawing frames. Reciprocating lever bars also drive the pawl and ratchet mechanisms which in turn drive the winches and the feeding mechanism of the log carriages through rack and pinion mechanisms. The winches can be used with the log hoist to lift logs from the water onto the sawing platform and to pull the log carriages back to their starting position.

== Public access ==
De Otter can be visited on Tuesdays from 12:00 p.m. to 16:00 p.m.
