= De Haan (surname) =

De Haan or de Haan is a Dutch family name meaning "The Rooster". The word "haan" is related to "hen", which is the same word in Dutch and in English. In 2007 20,707 people had this name in the Netherlands alone, making it the 29th most common name in that country. Variant spellings are De Haen, DeHaan, and Den Haan. People with this name include:

== De Haan ==
- Annemiek de Haan (born 1981), Dutch rower
- Calvin de Haan (born 1991), Canadian ice hockey player
- Caroline Lea de Haan (1881–1932), Dutch novelist writing as Carry van Bruggen, sister of Jacob israël de Haan
- Chantal Nijkerken-de Haan (born 1973), Dutch politician
- Cornelis de Haan (<1750–1793), Dutch Mennonite teacher and minister
- Erik de Haan (born 1964), Dutch footballer
- Eveline de Haan (born 1976), Dutch hockey player
- Ferry de Haan (1972), Dutch footballer
- Foppe de Haan (born 1943), Dutch football manager
- Henk de Haan (born 1941), Dutch economist and politician
- Jacob de Haan (composer) (born 1959), Dutch composer
- Jacob Israël de Haan (1881–1924), Dutch Jewish writer and journalist assassinated by the Haganah in Palestine, brother of Caroline
- Jan de Haan (born 1951), Dutch composer, conductor and musician
- Jo de Haan (1936–2006), Dutch cyclist
- Laurens de Haan (born 1937), Dutch economist known for the Pickands–Balkema–de Haan theorem
- Lex de Haan (1954–2006), Dutch computer scientist
- Mattheus de Haan (1663–1729), Dutch Governor-General of the Dutch East Indies
- Meijer de Haan (1852–1895), Dutch painter
- Poul de Haan (born 1947), Dutch coxswain
- Radjin de Haan (born 1969), Dutch-Surinamese footballer
- Roger De Haan, British businessman and philanthropist
- Setske de Haan (1889–1948), Dutch writer of children's books with the pseudonym Cissy van Marxveldt
- Sidney De Haan (1919–2002), English businessman
- Wilhem de Haan (1801–1855), Dutch zoologist and paleontologist
- Willem de Haan (1849–1930), Dutch conductor and composer

=== Bierens de Haan ===
- David Bierens de Haan (1822–1895), Dutch mathematician and historian of science
- Johannes Abraham Bierens de Haan (1883–1958), Dutch biologist and ethologist

=== Eilerts de Haan ===
- Johannes Gijsbert Willem Jacobus Eilerts de Haan (1865–1910), Dutch explorer and soldier

== De Haen ==
- Abraham de Haen (1707–1748), Dutch draughtsman and engraver
- Anton de Haen (1704–1776), Austrian physician
- David de Haen (1585–1622), Dutch painter and draughtsman
- Eugen de Haën (1835–1911), German chemist

== DeHaan ==
- Allyssa DeHaan (born 1988), American basketball and volleyball player
- Christel DeHaan (1942–2020), German-born American businesswoman and philanthropist
- Dane DeHaan (born 1986), American actor
- Kory DeHaan (born 1976), American baseball outfielder
- M. R. DeHaan (1891–1965), American Bible teacher

== Den Haan ==
- Ada den Haan (1941–2023), Dutch swimmer
- Jan den Haen (1630–1676), Dutch admiral
- Wouter den Haan (born 1962), Dutch economist

== See also ==
- De Haan (disambiguation)
- Haan (surname)
