= De Arend =

De Arend (English: The Eagle) is a name given to some windmills and a locomotive in the Netherlands.

== Windmills ==
- De Arend, Coevorden, a windmill in Drenthe.
- De Arend, Leeuwarden, a former post mill in Friesland
- De Arend, Leeuwarden, a former smock mill in Friesland
- De Arend, Terheijden, a windmill in North Brabant
- De Arend, Wouw, a windmill in North Brabant
- De Arend, Zuidland, windmill in South Holland
- Den Arend, Bergambacht, a windmill in South Holland

== Other ==
- De Arend (locomotive), the first locomotive in the Netherlands
