= DeHaan =

DeHaan is a concatenated form of the Dutch surname De Haan. Notable people with the surname include:

- Allyssa DeHaan (born 1988), American basketball and volleyball player
- Dane DeHaan (born 1986), American actor
- Kory DeHaan (born 1976), American baseball outfielder
- M. R. DeHaan (1891–1965), American Bible teacher
