= De Haan =

De Haan may refer to:

== municipalities in Belgium ==
- De Haan, Belgium, a municipality in West Flanders

== Windmills in the Netherlands ==
- De Haan, Brouwershaven, a windmill in Zeeland
- De Haan, De Heurne, Gelderland
- De Haan, Franeker, a windmill in Friesland
- De Haan, Leeuwarden, see windmill in Leeuwarden
- Zwarte Haan, Sint Jacobiparochie, a windmill in Friesland
- De Kemphaan, De Waal, a windmill in North Holland
- 't Haantje, Weesp, a windmill in North Holland
- Het Haantje, Leeuwarden, a windmill in Leeuwarden

== Other uses ==
- Volley De Haan, the local volleyball team of De Haan, Belgium
- De Haan (surname), a common Dutch-language surname
- De Haan's Bus & Coach, a South African bus manufacturer

== See also ==
- Bierens de Haan (disambiguation)
- Haan (surname)
