= Jacob de Haan =

Jacob de Haan may refer to:

- Jacob Israël de Haan (1881–1924), Dutch-Jewish novelist, poet, journalist, diplomat and legal scholar who was assassinated in Jerusalem
- Jacob de Haan (composer) (born 1959), Dutch composer, music arranger and conductor; frequently performs his own work

== See also ==
- De Haan (disambiguation)
