= Matthias Jansz van Geuns =

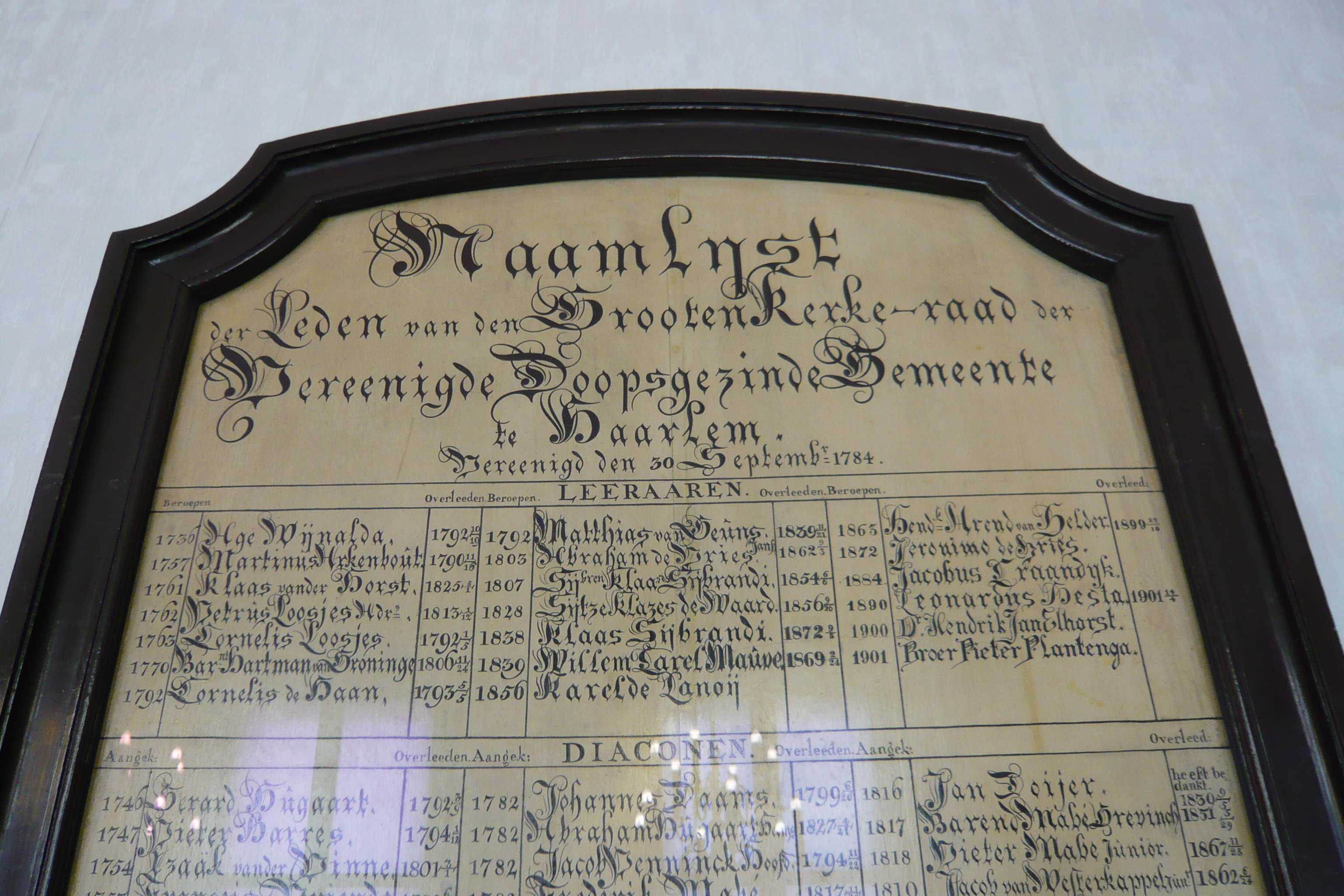
Matthias Jansz van Geuns' name as "teacher, called 1792" in the Doopsgezinde kerk, Haarlem

Matthias Jansz van Geuns (Groningen, 15 September 1758 - Haarlem, 21 November 1839) was a Dutch Mennonite teacher and minister.

Matthias Jansz van Geuns was the son of Jan Stevens van Geuns, and served in Makkum 1783-1787, Harlingen 1787-1792 and in Haarlem 1792-1828. He married Tryntje Cornelisd Sytses of Leeuwarden and two of their sons, Cornelis Sytse and Bartel, also became Mennonite ministers. In Haarlem he was minister of the congregation in the Peuzelaarsteeg, along with several friends who put together a songbook with 150 songs, 74 of which were written by Aagje Deken. He is also noted as a silhouettist, and made silhouettes of many of his family and friends.

Matthias served in Haarlem, as a replacement for Cornelis de Haan when the latter died in 1792, serving till 1828. He also succeeded Cornelis in his appointment as member of the Teylers First Society, which position he filled for nearly 50 years, until his death in 1839.

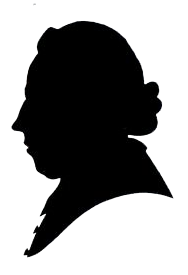
Silhouette of Adam Sijbel

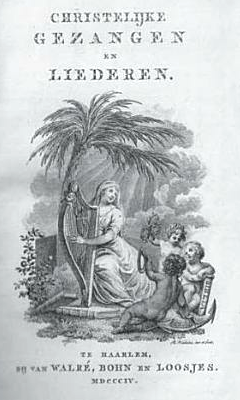
Songbook published in 1804 with 74 lyrics by Aagje Deken and forward signed by Geuns
