= Bierens de Haan =

Bierens de Haan is a surname of Dutch origin. People with that name include:

- David Bierens de Haan, a Dutch mathematician and historian (1822–1895)
- Johannes Abraham Bierens de Haan, a Dutch biologist and ethologist (1883–1958)

== See also ==
- de Haan (disambiguation)
