= De Arend, Terheijden =

Windmill in The Netherlands

De Arend
- The Eagle
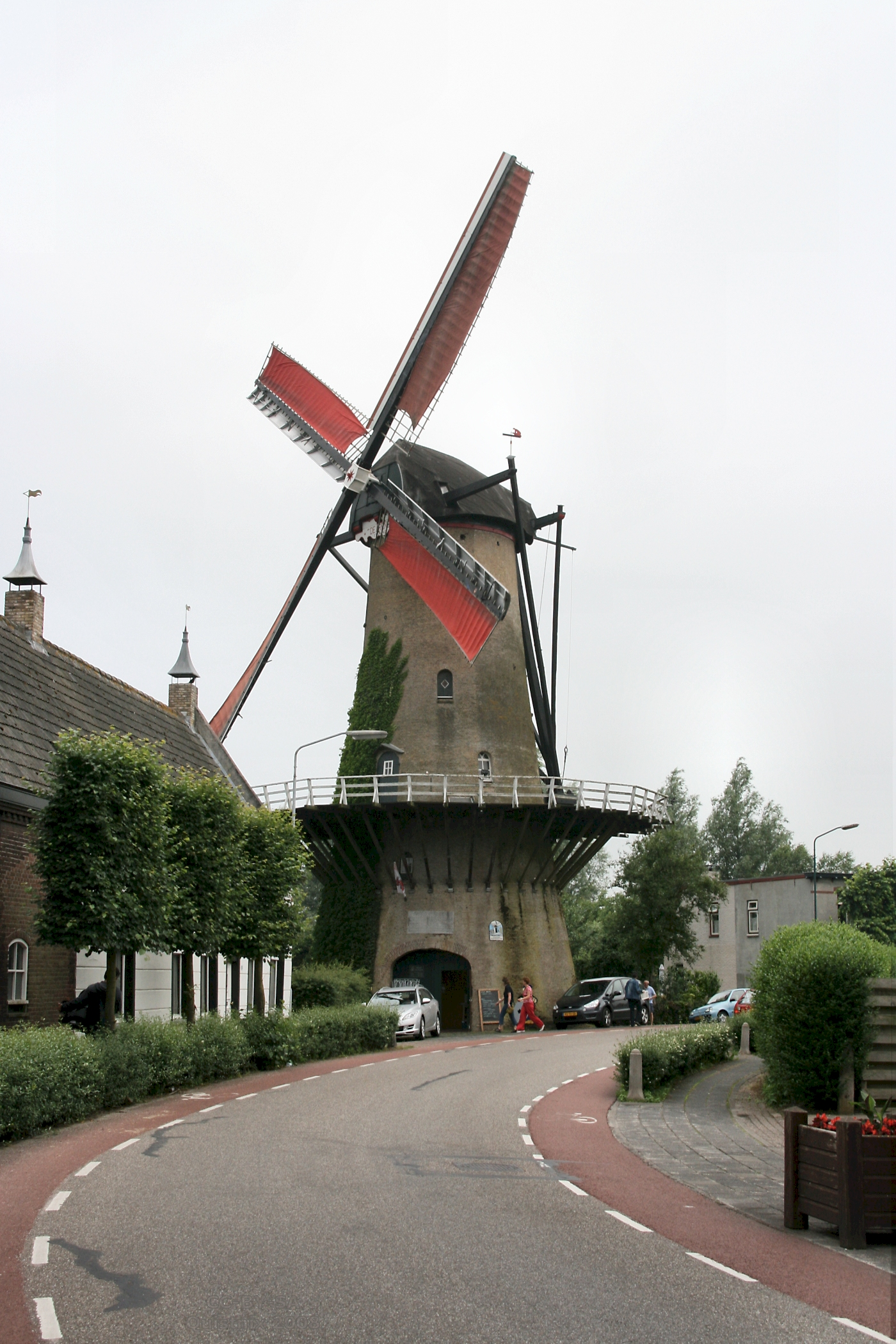
- De Arend in 2008

General information
- Status: Rijksmonument (34992)
- Type: Windmill
- Address: Molenstraat 40; 4844 AP, Terheijden, Drimmelen
- Town or city: Drimmelen
- Country: Netherlands
- Coordinates: 51.645811°N 4.745325°E
- Completed: 1742 / 1756
- Designations: Gristmill

References
- Database of Mills; De Hollandsche Molen

De Arend (English: The Eagle) is a windmill located on the Molenstraat 40 in Terheijden, Drimmelen, in the province of North Brabant, Netherlands. Built in 1742 the windmill functioned as a gristmill. The mill was built as a tower mill and its sails have a span of 24.80 meters. The mill is a national monument (nr 34992) since 19 May 1971. The mill is still in use and is property of the municipality of Drimmelen. It is open to public viewing.

== History ==
The mill was built in 1742 by order of the noble family of Nassau-Siegen from Breda. A large foundation stone can still be seen commemorating this occasion. The mill burned down in 1756 and had to be rebuilt. During the French period of the early 19th century the mill became private property. In the late 1960s the mill became property of the former municipality of Terheijden, which had the mill restored. The mill has 3 millstones, 2 of which are in use. One is electrically driven and the other by wind.

== Gallery of images ==
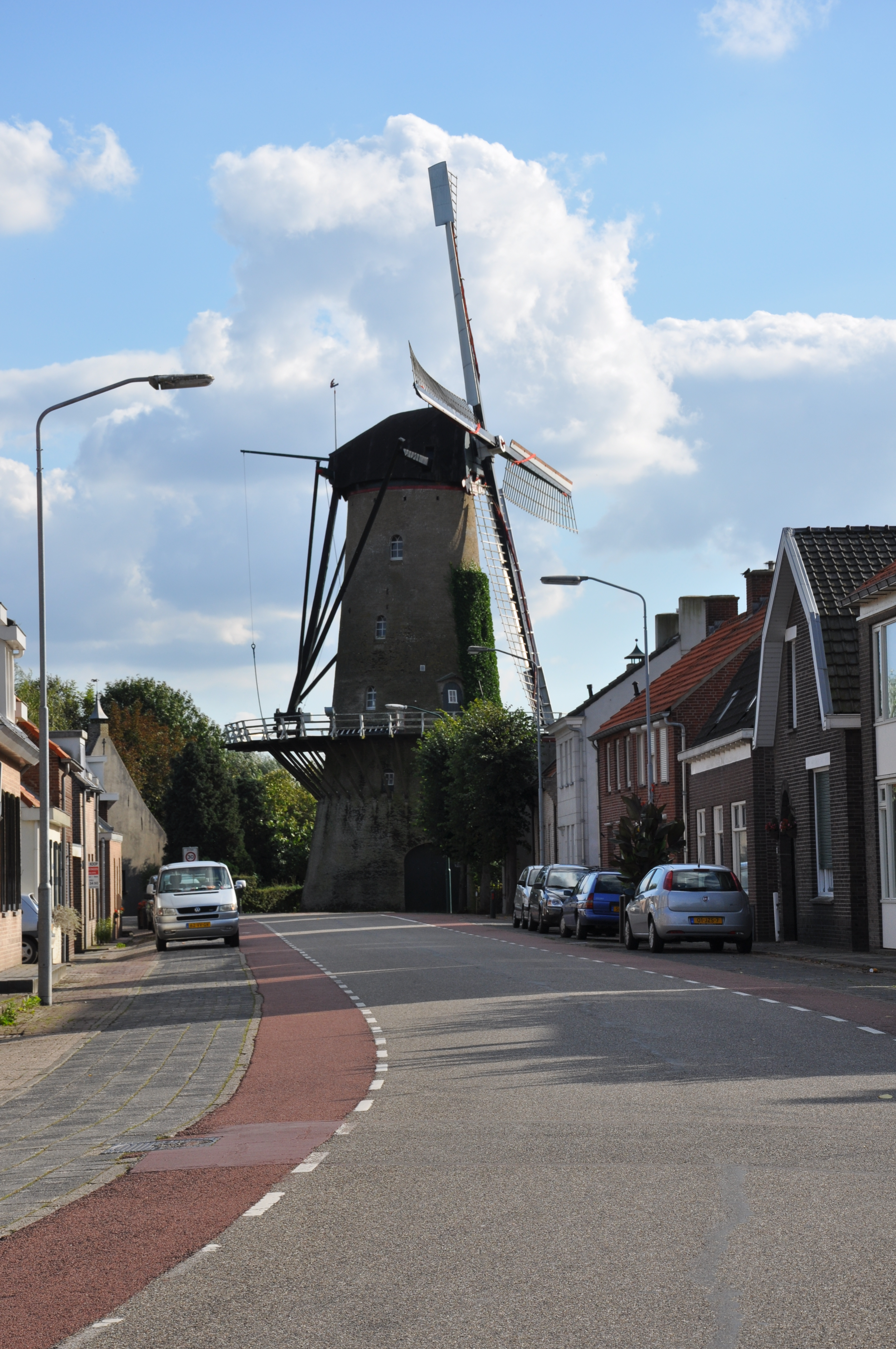
The mill and its surrounding buildings

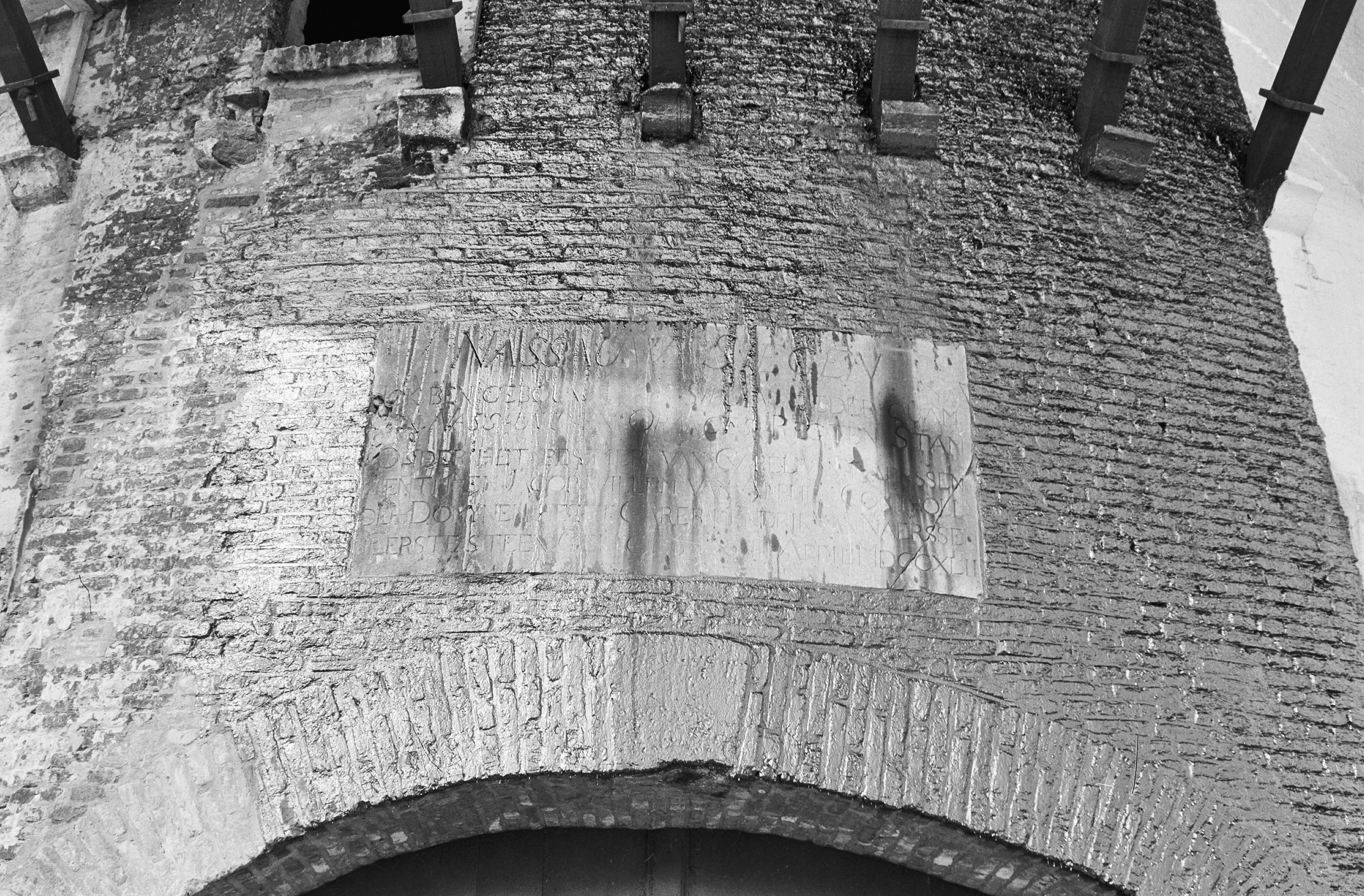
foundation stone

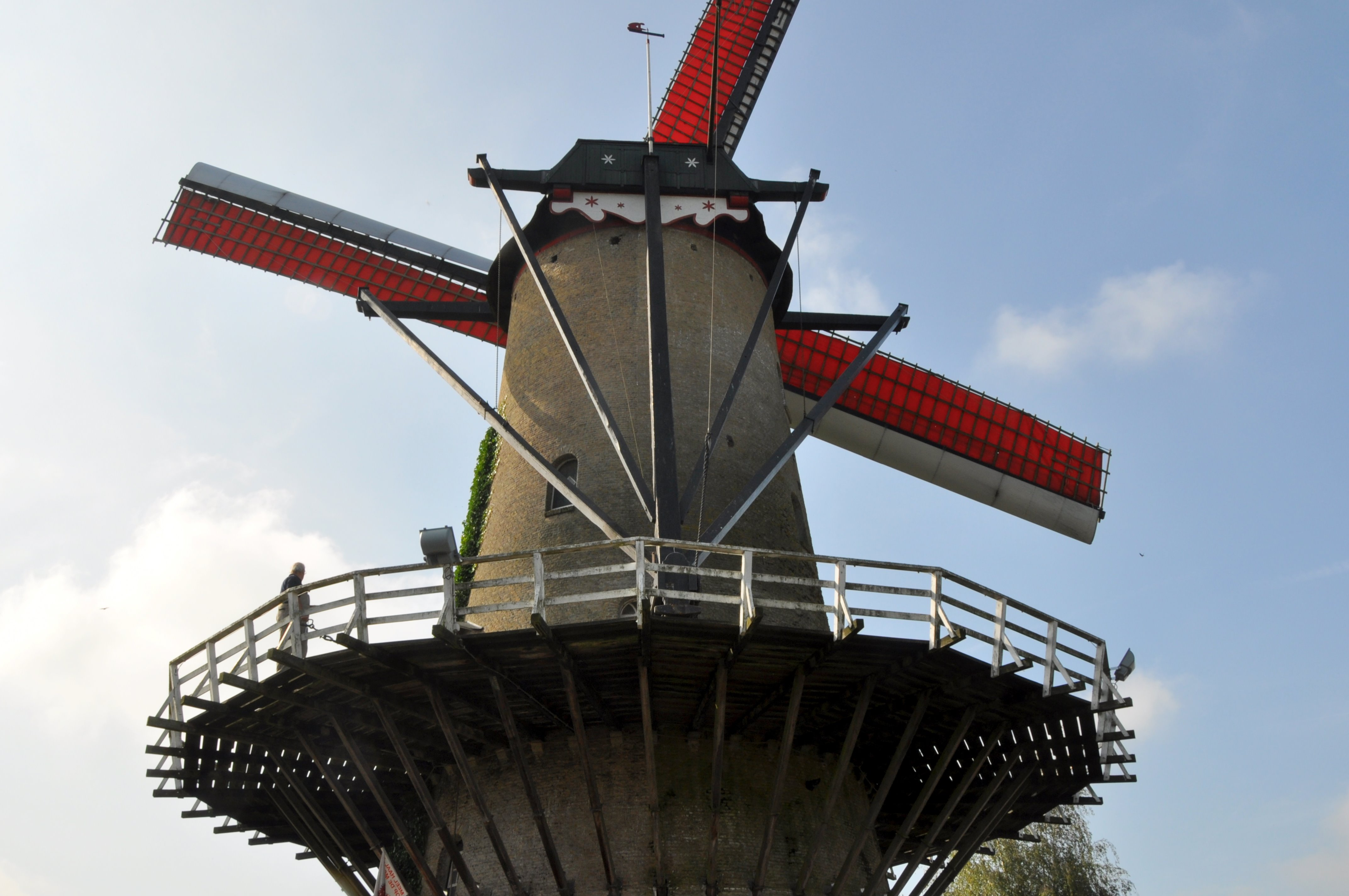
Close-up of the top half of the mill

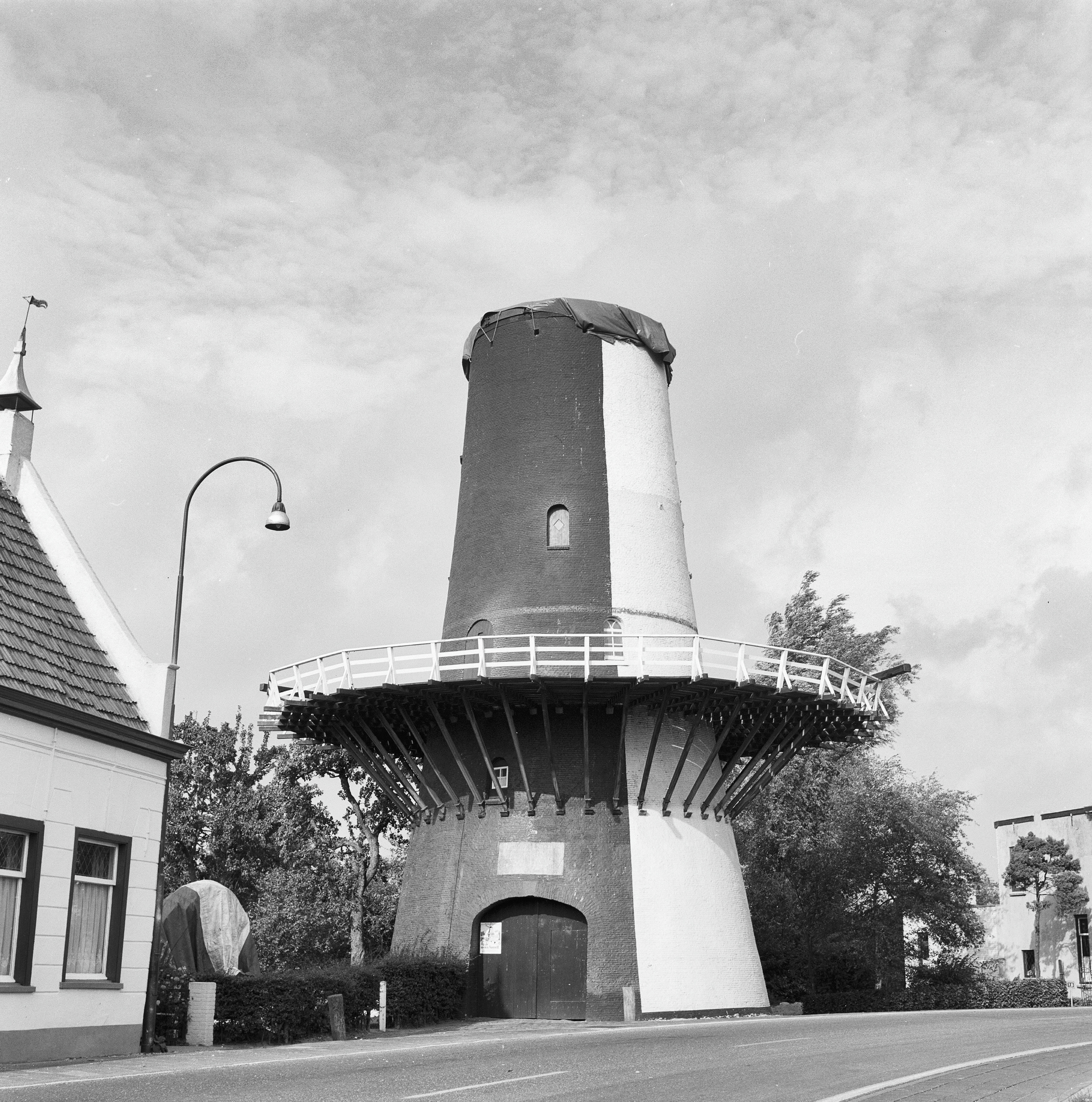
Mill without its sails
