= Jan de Haan =

Dutch composer, conductor and musician

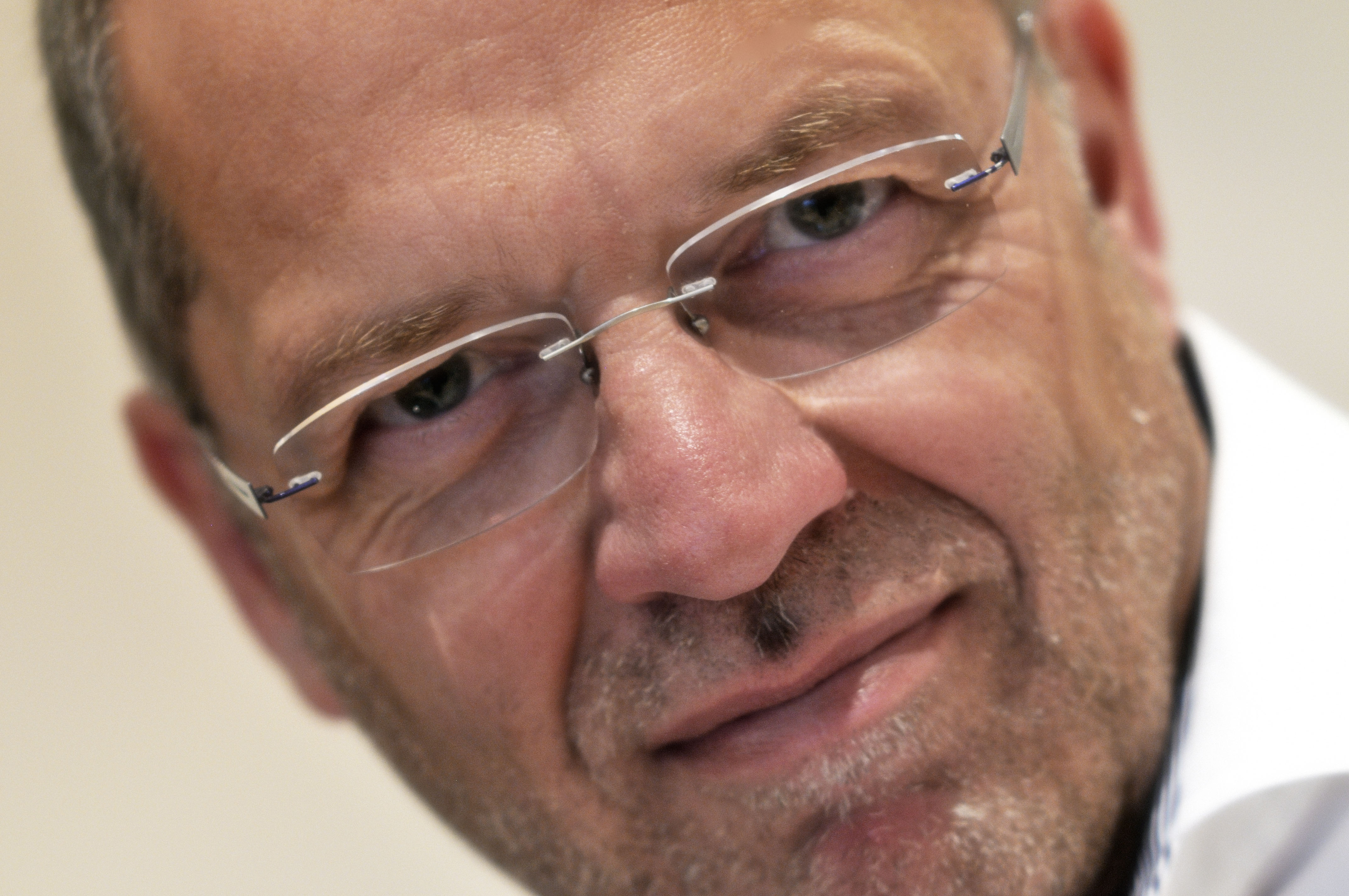
- Born: July 29, 1951 (age 75); Warns, Friesland, Netherlands
- Relatives: Jacob de Haan (Brother)

Jan de Haan (born July 29, 1951 in Warns, Friesland) is a contemporary Dutch composer, conductor and musician.

Jan de Haan was born in the Frisian village of Warns, in the Netherlands, in 1951. He was inspired early in life by his father, who was a great lover of wind music. De Haan was attracted to conducting from an early age and, by the time he was 17, he was already leading several wind bands. From 1969 to 1973 he studied music pedagogy and trombone at the Academy of Music in Leeuwarden and in 1976 he was awarded his conductor’s master diploma from the Conservatory of Utrecht, where he studied with Henk van Lijnschooten. Until 1994, Jan de Haan was the conductor of the well-known Dutch brass band Soli Brass. As a guest conductor, he has worked with a number of professional and amateur wind bands and ensembles. In this capacity, De Haan has travelled extensively throughout Western Europe and to the USA, Iran, and Japan. Famous bands like the Tokyo Kosei Wind Orchestra, the Desford Colliery Brass Band, the Brighouse and Rastrick Brass Band, all four Dutch military concert bands, the Frisian Orchestra, the Radio Wind Ensemble and the Dutch National Youth Fanfare Band have been conducted by him. From 1978 to 1989, Jan de Haan worked as a conductor, composer and arranger for Dutch radio and television. As a programme maker he produced around 140 television music programmes. He also worked as a teacher at the Academy of Music in Leeuwarden for a number of years. Alongside his activities as a guest conductor, composer and international jury member, Jan de Haan was active at De Haske Publications. He founded the music publishing company in 1983, but sold his shares in the company 25 years later in 2008 to be able to dedicate his time to composing, arranging and conducting.

== Awards ==
- 1994: Dutch Federation of Christian Music Federations

Highest award (gold pin with inlaid emerald) of the Dutch Federation of Christian Music Federations.

- 1998: The Frisian Enterprise of the Year

Music publisher De Haske Publications is declared the winner at the election of The Enterprise of the Year.

- 2006: Cultural award ‘The Gratema’

Cultural award ‘The Gratema’ from the municipality of Smallingerland (Fr.)

- 2012: Buma Brass Award

For his achievements for the music industry.

- 2025: Fryske Anjer

Awarded the Cultuurfonds Culture Award in recognition of his contribution to the wind-, fanfare- and brass band sector. For his achievements for the music industry.

- 2026: WMC Ambassador

Appointed as a World Music Contest Ambassador in recognition of his many years of dedication and commitment to the event.

== Works for concert band ==
- 1972: Apollo March
- 1978: Chorale Varié
- 1979: Meditation
- 1981: Christmas Fantasy
- 1981: Fryske Variaties
- 1983: Five Intradas
- 1983: Partita
- 1983: Prelude for Passiontide
- 1984: Canticum
- 1985: Pastorale
- 1985: Psaltrada
- 1985: Suite over Valeriusliederen
- 1986: A Christmas Suite
- 1990: Song of Freedom
- 1992: Danses de Fantaisie
- 1993: A Discovery Fantasy
  1. Introduction
  2. Bolero
  3. Rondeau
  4. Intermezzo
  5. Finale
- 1993: Inspiration
- 1993: Intermezzo
- 1995: Banja Luka
- 1995: Overture to new Age
- 1996: A Sunrise Impression
- 1996: Spanish Tritych
  1. Peñon de Ifach
  2. San Jaime
  3. Sierra de Bernia
- 1997: Music for a Solemnity A tribute to John Williams
- 1998: Victory
- 2000: Bandtime Starter
- 2000: Beethoven Forever
- 2000: Cyclist in Moscow
- 2001: A Chinese Man in Paris
- 2001: The Music Factory
- 2001: The Syncopated Band Parade
- 2001: March of the Animals
- 2003: Prevision
- 2005: Earthquake
- 2006: Hispaniola
- 2007: Bläserklasse Live
- 2007: Camel Ride
- 2007: Klasse(n) Musikanten
- 2008: Christmas Joy
- 2008: Cityscapes
- 2008: Emerald Jubilee
- 2008: Susato Variations
- 2008: Sweet Sunset
- 2008: Te Deum
- 2009: Consolation
- 2009: Flashback
- 2009: Meine erste Weihnachtskonzert
- 2009: Triumphal Winds
- 2009: Zodiac
- 2010: Geuzen Medal Fanfare
- 2010: Liberty
- 2010: Le Lion de Belfort
- 2010: Pierius Magnus
- 2011: Musica Helvetica
- 2011: Spring Song
- 2012: Bläserklasse Globus
- 2012: Klezmeriana
- 2012: Song of David
- 2014: Homage
- 2014: The Torch of Liberty
- 2016: Belvedere
- 2016: Galea et Bellum
- 2016: Purcellian Fantasia (Based on the March from Henry Purcell's "Funeral Music of Queen Mary II")
- 2018: Tribute to a Maestro (Variations on a theme by Jean-Philippe Rameau)
- 2018: Centenary 2019
  1. Awakening Village
  2. Bintje Monument
  3. Journey into the Unknown
- 2019: Center of the Universe
  1. Reconstruction
  2. Pastorale
  3. Excelsior
- 2019: The Temple Musician
- 2019: The Secret of Mercury
- 2019: Duoloque (Flugelhorn and Tenorhorn solo & band)
- 2019: The Baltic Way
  1. Struggle for Independence
  2. Decades of Suffering
  3. Chain of Freedom
- 2020: A touch of Klez! (Flute or Alto saxophone solo & band)
- 2020: Hermitage (Concertante Variations on an original theme after Peter Ilyich Tchaikovsky)
- 2021: Bommen Berend
- 2021: Bommen Berend (Highlights)
- 2021: Color Concordia (Fantasy Concertante on “C(on)C(or)D(i)A”
- 2022: Fostedina
- 2023: Love Poems (For Bass/Baritone (voice) and Symphonic Band)
- 2023: Glory Song
- 2023: Barilove (For baritone sax. and band)
- 2023: Pioneers of the Past

== Works for brass bands ==
- 1972: Apollo March
- 1978: Chorale Varié
- 1979: Meditation
- 1981: Christmas Fantasy
- 1981: Fryske Variaties
- 1983: Five Intradas
- 1983: Partita
- 1983: Prelude for Passiontide
- 1985: Pastorale
- 1985: Psaltrada
- 1985: Suite over Valeriusliederen
- 1986: A Christmas Suite
- 1986: Contrasten
- 1987: Oxford Intrada
- 1990: Song of Freedom
- 1990: Variations on a Chord
- 1993: Inspiration
- 1994: Harmony Festival
- 1996: A Sunrise Impression
- 2003: Prevision
- 2005: Earthquake
- 2006: Hispaniola
- 2007: Camel Ride
- 2008: Christmas Joy
- 2008: Cityscapes
- 2008: Emerald Jubilee
- 2008: Susato Variations
- 2008: Sweet Sunset
- 2009: Consolation
- 2009: Flashback
- 2009: Triumphal Brass
- 2010: Alhambra
- 2011: Musica Helvetica
- 2011: Spring Song
- 2012: Introduction and Variations on Dies Irae
- 2013: Metamorphosis
- 2014: Chorale Variations
- 2014: Terra Incognita
- 2016: Apollo Overture
- 2016: Belvedere
- 2016: Purcellian Fantasia (Based on the March from Henry Purcell's "Funeral Music of Queen Mary II")
- 2018: The Patriots (Symphonic Fantasia)
- 2019: The Baltic Way
  1. Struggle for Independence
  2. Decades of Suffering
  3. Chain of Freedom
- 2019: Duoloque (Flugelhorn and Tenorhorn solo & brass band)
- 2019: Redbad (A Symphonic Portrait)
- 2020: Hermitage (Concertante Variations on an original theme after Peter Ilyich Tchaikovsky)
- 2020: Sint Pitersdei
- 2020: In loving Memory
- 2020: Pale Blue Dot
- 2022: Wigerathorp (Based on the hymn “Jerusalem” by Sir Hubert Parry)
  1. Gerke's Overture
  2. The Monks of Claercamp
  3. Monastery Jerusalem
- 2023: Pioneers of the Past
- 2025: Mirage (A Symphonic Portrait inspired by the Saga of "The Flying Dutchman")
- 2025: Pro Musica
- 2026: Energy (Sketches of Motions and Emotions)
- 2026: Cape Reinga (Te Rerenga - The spirits pathway) For Tenor Horn and Brass Band.
