= Cornelis de Haan =

Dutch Mennonite teacher and minister

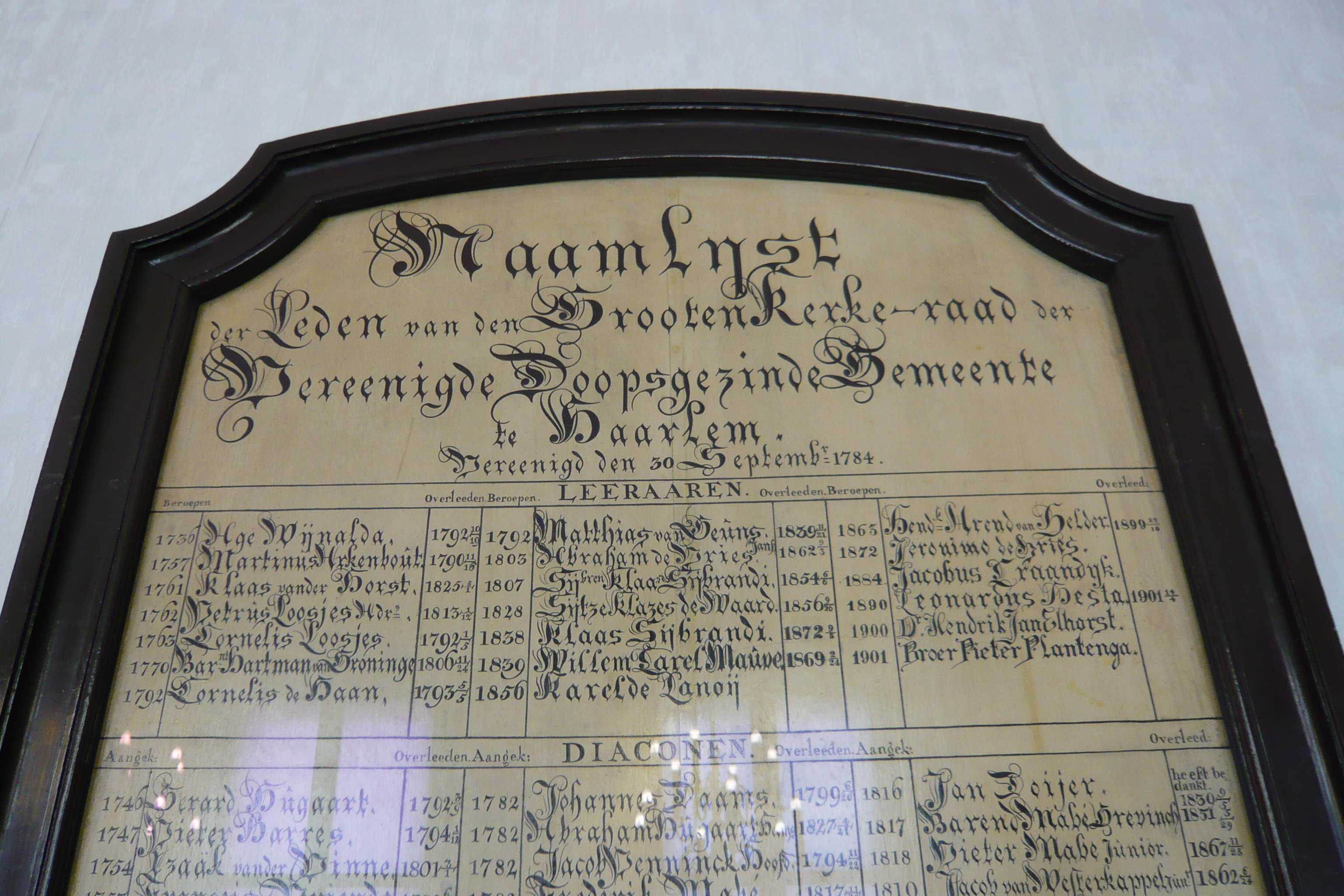
Cornelis de Haan's name as "teacher, called 1792" in the Doopsgezinde kerk, Haarlem

Cornelis de Haan (before 1750 – 5 May 1793) was a Dutch Mennonite teacher and minister.

Little is known of him, but he was a member of the De Haan family of Haarlem Mennonites. Cornelis served in Haarlem in 1792, as a replacement for Cornelis Loosjes. He also succeeded Loosjes in his appointment as member of the Teylers First Society the same year. He filled both positions for very short terms, as he died the next year, and was succeeded in both appointments by Matthias van Geuns Jz.
