= Haan (surname) =

Haan is surname of Dutch origin (Dutch spelling of German: Hahn). People with this name include:

- Arie Haan (born 1948), Dutch football player and manager
- Edmond Haan (1924–2018), French football player
- Gijsbert Haan (1801–1874), Dutch-American religious leader, founder of the Christian Reformed Church in the United States and Canada
- William G. Haan (1863–1924), American army officer during WWI

== See also ==
- De Haan (surname)
- Han (Korean surname)
