= List of windmills in Friesland =

List of Dutch windmills

This list of windmills in the Dutch province of Friesland had to be split into several sub-lists due to size. For attribution reasons, it cannot be deleted and now serves to link to the sub-lists.

== Notes ==
Mills still standing marked in bold. Known building dates are bold, otherwise the date is the earliest known date the mill was standing.
