= De Arend, Wouw =

Windmill in North Brabant, Netherlands

De Arend
- The Eagle
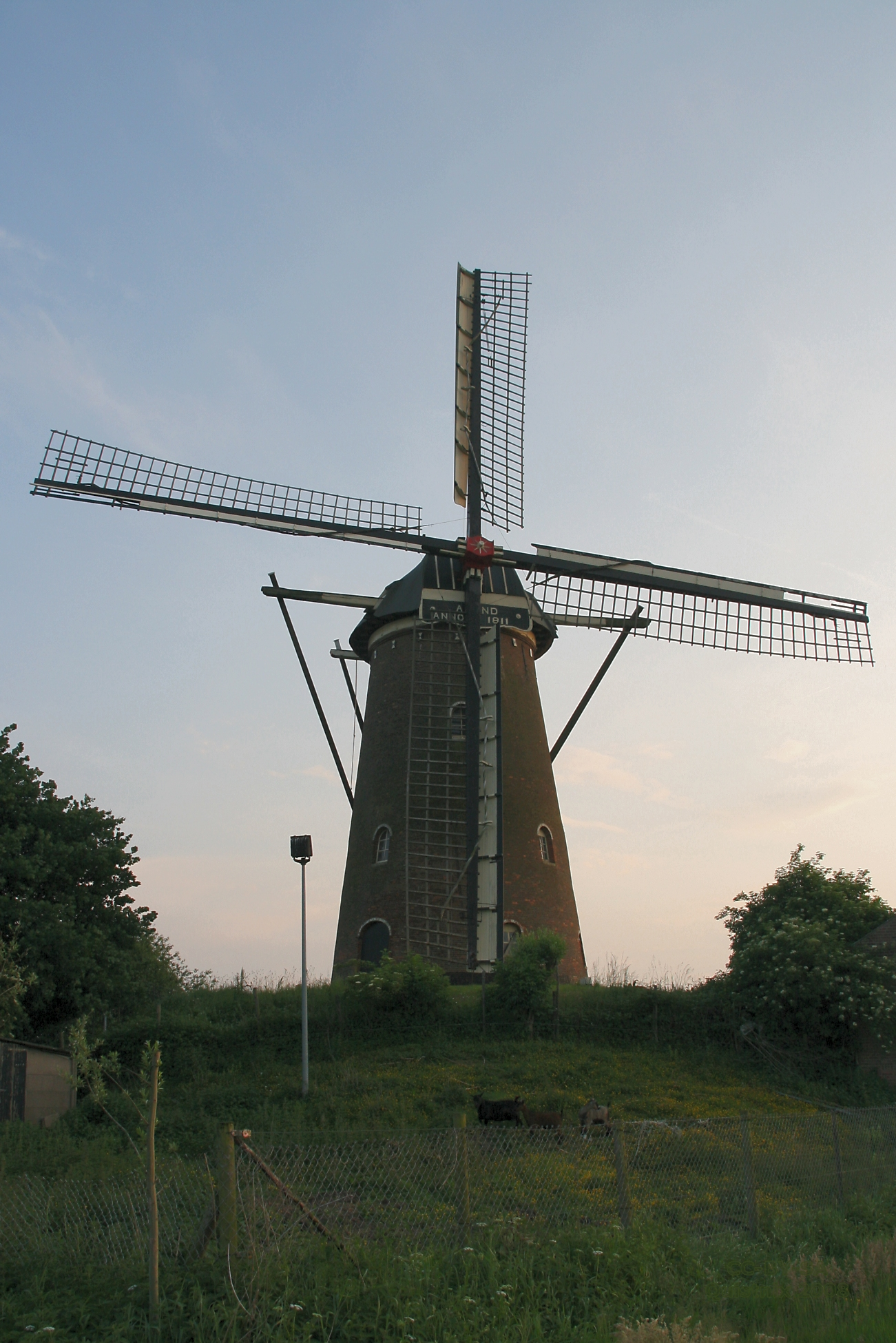
- De Arend in 2008

General information
- Status: Rijksmonument (39624)
- Type: Windmill
- Address: Akkerstraat 11; 4724 SX, Wouw, Roosendaal
- Town or city: Roosendaal
- Country: Netherlands
- Coordinates: 51.516389°N 4.385278°E
- Completed: 1811, 1825
- Designations: Gristmill

References
- Database of Mills; De Hollandsche Molen

De Arend (English: The Eagle) is a windmill located on the Akkerstraat 11 in Wouw, Roosendaal, in the province of North Brabant, Netherlands. Built in 1811 on an artificial hill, the windmill functioned as a gristmill. The mill was built as a tower mill and its sails have a span of 25.85 metres (84.8 ft). The mill is a national monument (nr 39624) since 24 June 1971.

== History ==
The mill was built in 1811 by the order of Jacobus Aerden, who took the opportunity to build a mill right after the molendwang, a system in which local peasants were obligated to use a certain local mill, was discontinued by the French revolutionaries. The mill burned down in 1825 and was rebuilt that same year. In 1914, the de Aerden family sold the mill to Jacobus Potters, whose family still owns the mill.

== Public access ==
The mill is still in use and is open to public viewing on Tuesdays and Saturdays between 10:00 and 16:00.

== Gallery of images ==
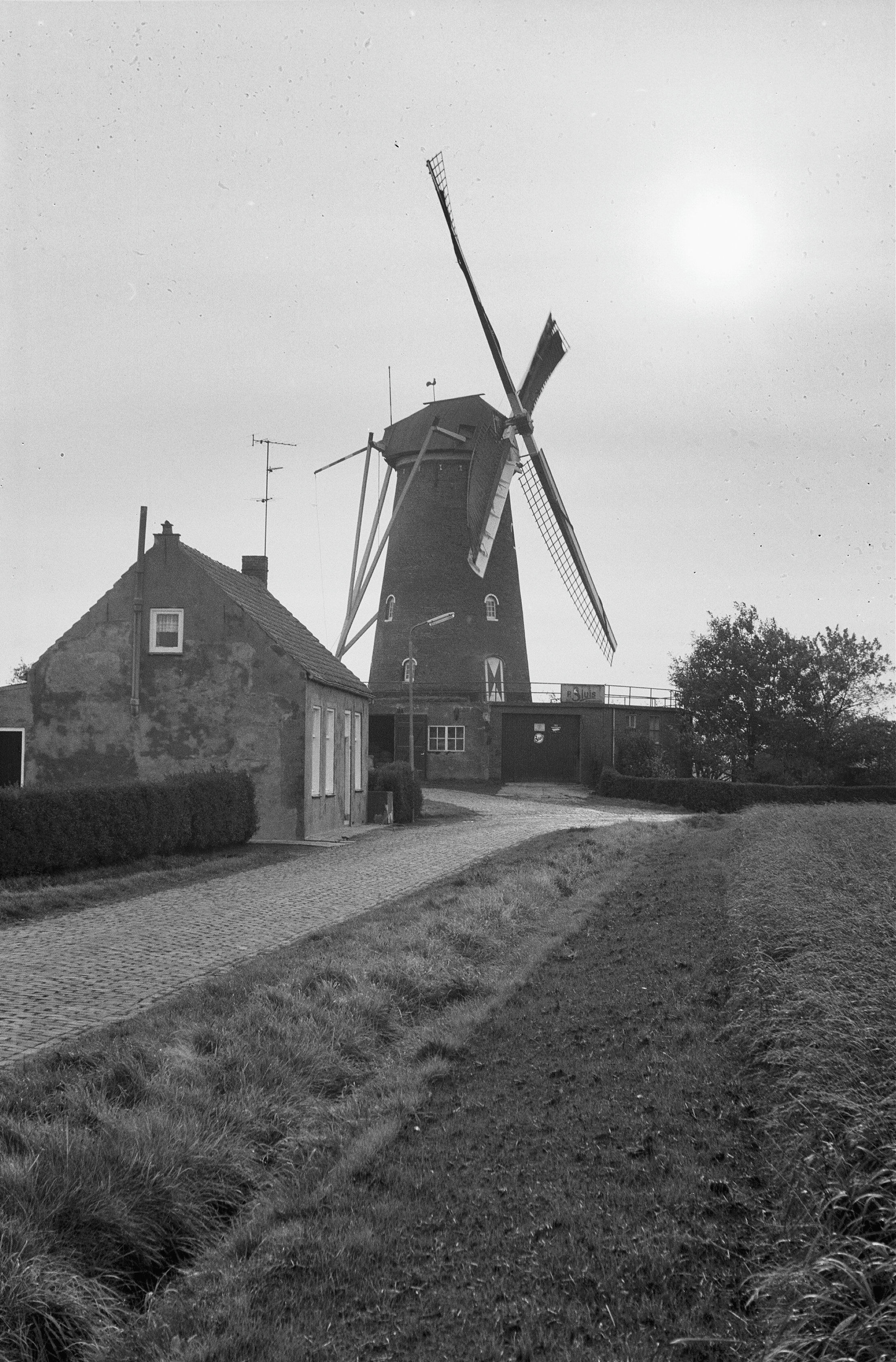
Side view of the mill

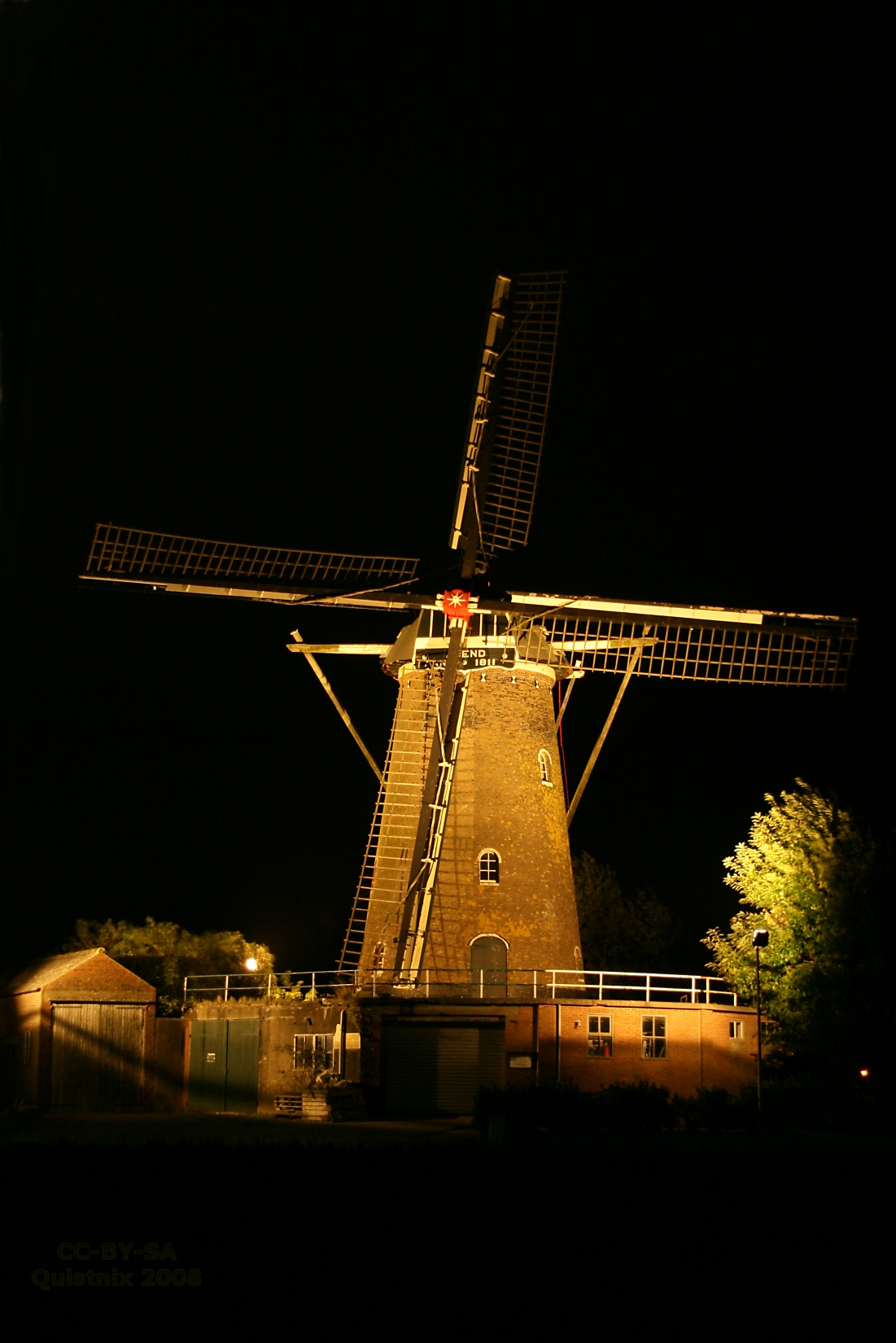
The Arend by night

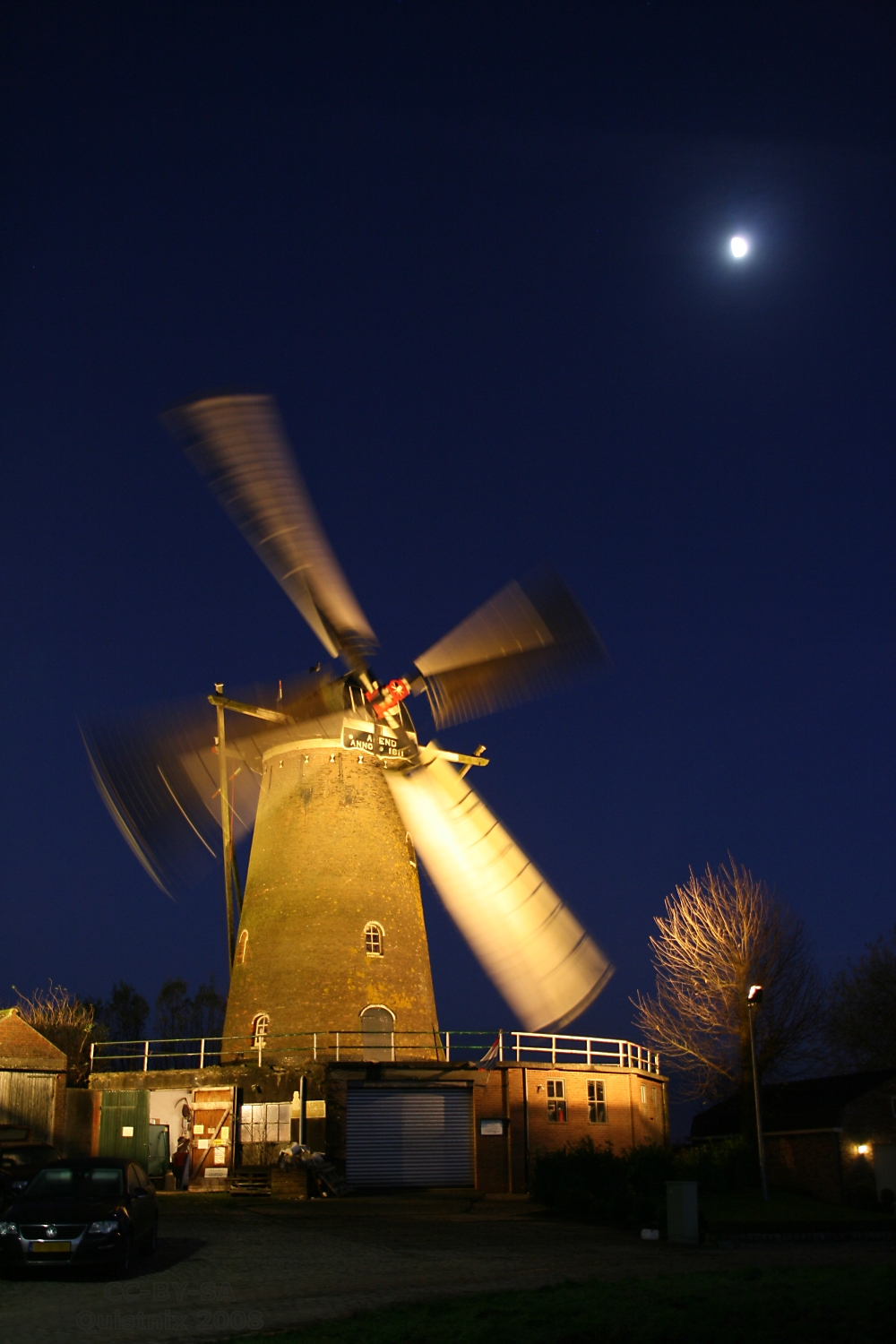
The Arend operating at night
