= Kory DeHaan =

American baseball player (born 1976)

- Outfielder
- Born: July 16, 1976 (age 49); Pella, Iowa, U.S.
- Batted: Left Threw: Right

MLB debut
- April 25, 2000, for the San Diego Padres

Last MLB appearance
- September 29, 2002, for the San Diego Padres

MLB statistics
- Batting average: .193
- Home runs: 2
- Runs batted in: 13
- Stats at Baseball Reference

Teams
- San Diego Padres (2000, 2002)

Korwin Jay "Kory" DeHaan (born July 16, 1976) is a former Major League Baseball outfielder. He is an alumnus of Morningside College.

Drafted by the Pittsburgh Pirates in the 7th round of the 1997 MLB amateur draft, DeHaan would make his Major League Baseball debut with the San Diego Padres on April 25, 2000, and appear in his final game on September 29, 2002.

Currently, he is the batting coach of the Bradenton Marauders.

== Minor league coach ==
DeHaan became the interim manager for the Golden Baseball League's Chico Outlaws after starting the 2009 season as hitting coach. He replaced Greg Cadaret on July 24, 2009, who was fired that day. In December 2009, he left the Outlaws to accept the job as hitting coach for the Padres' rookie league club in Peoria, Arizona.

On December 1, 2011, DeHaan was named as a coach for the Pirates' High-A affiliate, the Bradenton Marauders.
