= Windmills in Leeuwarden =

Windmills in Dutch city

The city of Leeuwarden, Friesland, the Netherlands has had at least 130 windmills over the centuries. Only one, the Froskepôlemolen survives today within Leeuwarden. Six other mills which have stood in Leeuwarden survive elsewhere in the Netherlands. The mills had a wide range of industrial and agricultural uses. The industrial uses include the processing of bark for tanning leather, the fulling of cloth, the production of cement, the production of dyes, the extraction of oil (including the production of paints), the grinding of tobacco to produce snuff, the production of gunpowder, and the sawing of timber. Agricultural uses include the milling of buckwheat, oats, rye and wheat, the processing of chicory, the production of pearl barley, and the pumping of water.

== Surviving windmills ==
=== Froskepôlemolen ===
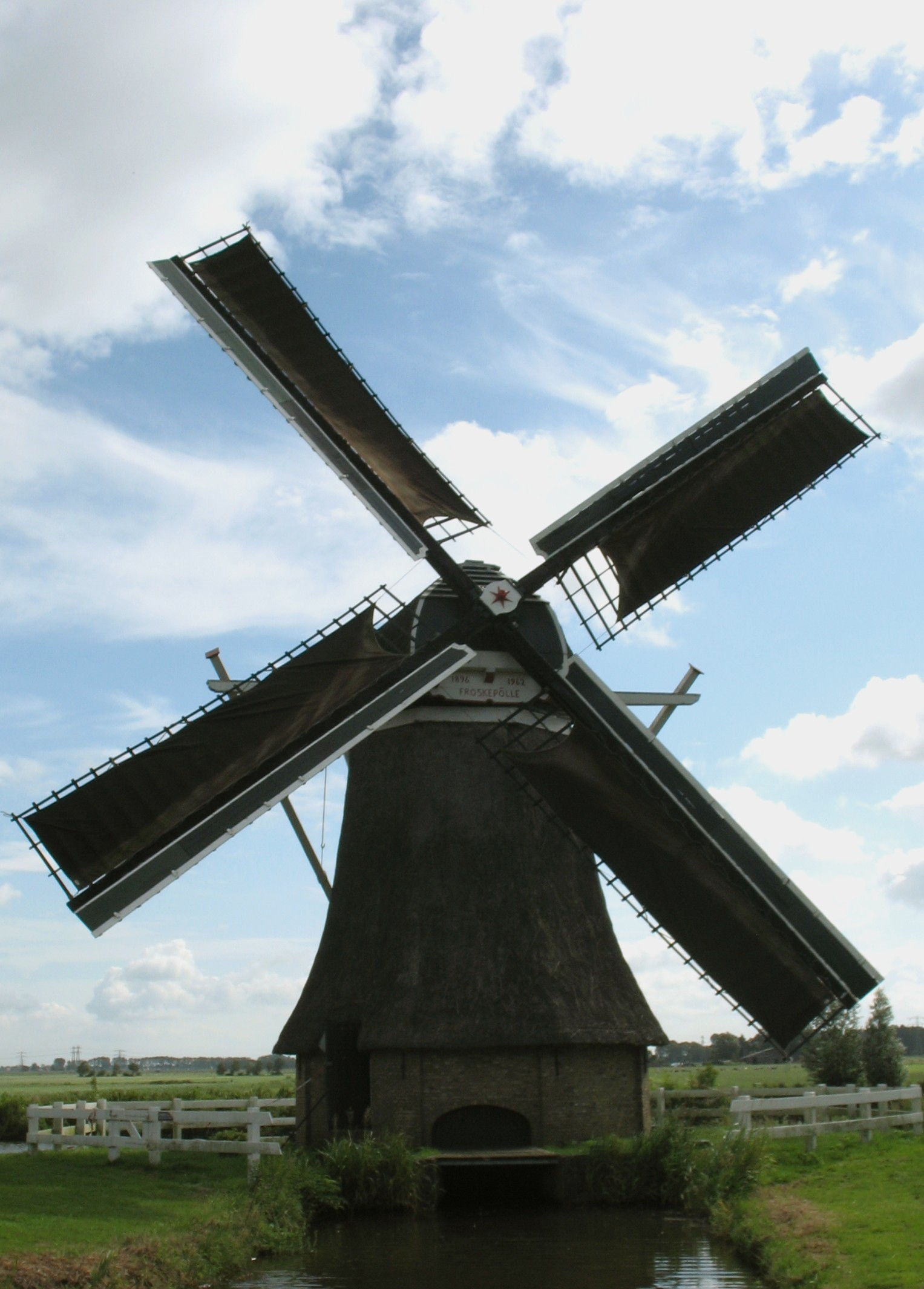
Froskepôlemolen, August 2008

The grondzeiler Huizumer en Goutum Nieuwlandmolen was moved to a new site within Leeuwarden in 1962. It now stands on the island known as Froskepôlle at 53°11′21″N 5°51′10″E. The mill is a drainage mill, and is maintained in working order.

== Windmills with surviving remains ==
=== De Haan ===
The stellingmolen De Haan (English: The Rooster) was built before 1685. It stood on the south side of the Zuidvliet at 53°12′08″N 5°49′01″E. It was a fulling mill. In 1749 it was converted to a barley mill. In 1832 it was converted to an oil mill, at which time it was known as De Haan. After 1848 it was also a cement mill. The mill was standing in 1878, but had been demolished by 1903 leaving the base which survives, having survived a threat of demolition in 2003.

=== De Eendracht, (oil and barley mill) ===
De Eendracht (English: The Unity) was a stellingmolen which built before 1786 as a barley and oat hulling mill. It was later converted to an oil mill. The mill stood on the Dokkumer Trekweg at 53°12′39″N 5°48′00″E. In 1888, the smock was moved to Anjum, where it was erected on a new brick base. The mill stands today, known as De Eendracht. At Leeuwarden, the original base of De Eendracht survives. Following a fire in 2014, a proposal was made in November 2015 to build a new smock on the existing base. The building would be used for residential purposes. The new steel-framed smock and cap, with dummy sails, was lifted onto the base on 6 March 2018.

== Windmills formerly in Leeuwarden which survive elsewhere ==
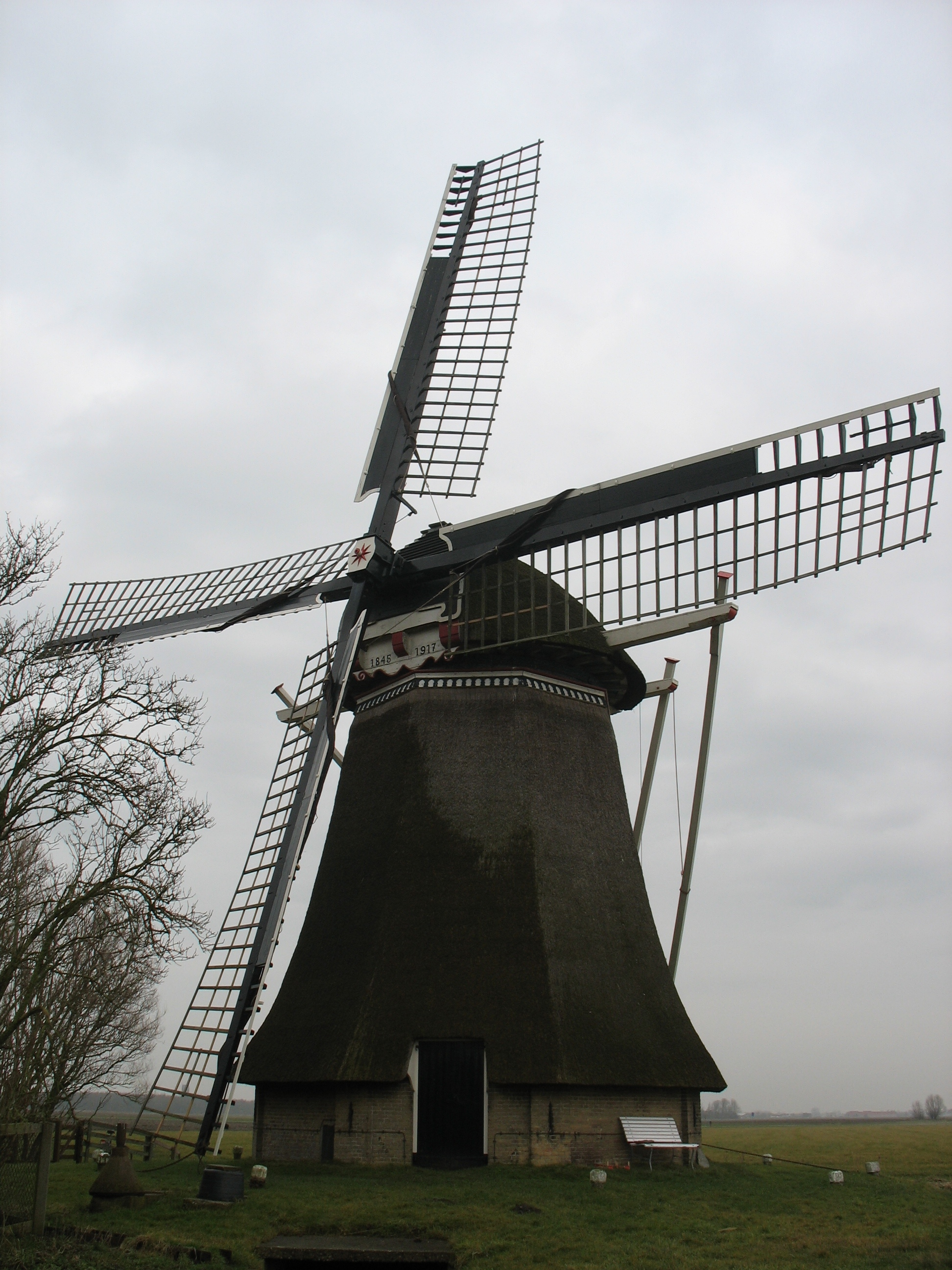
De Phenix, Marrum

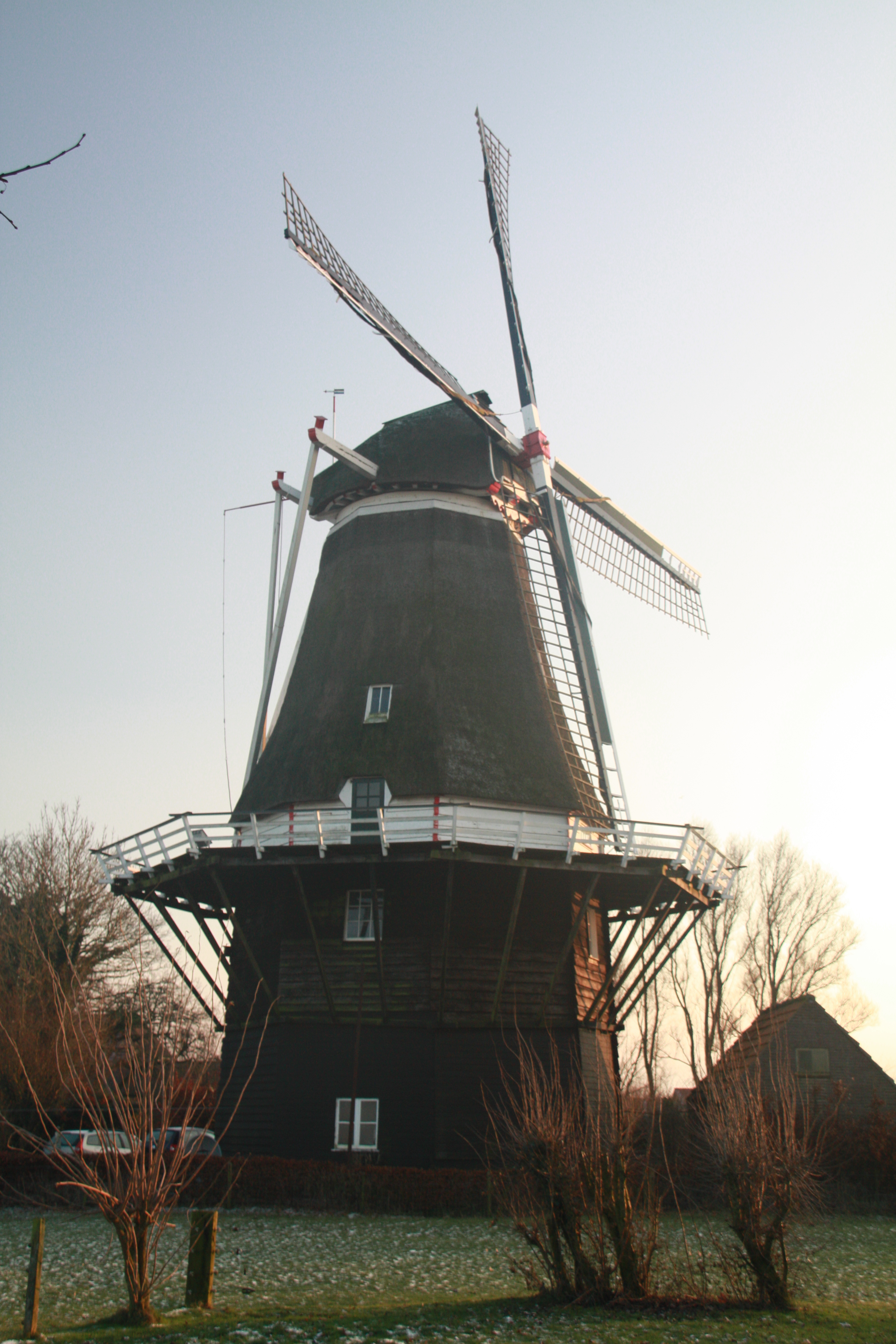
De Vlijt, Marle

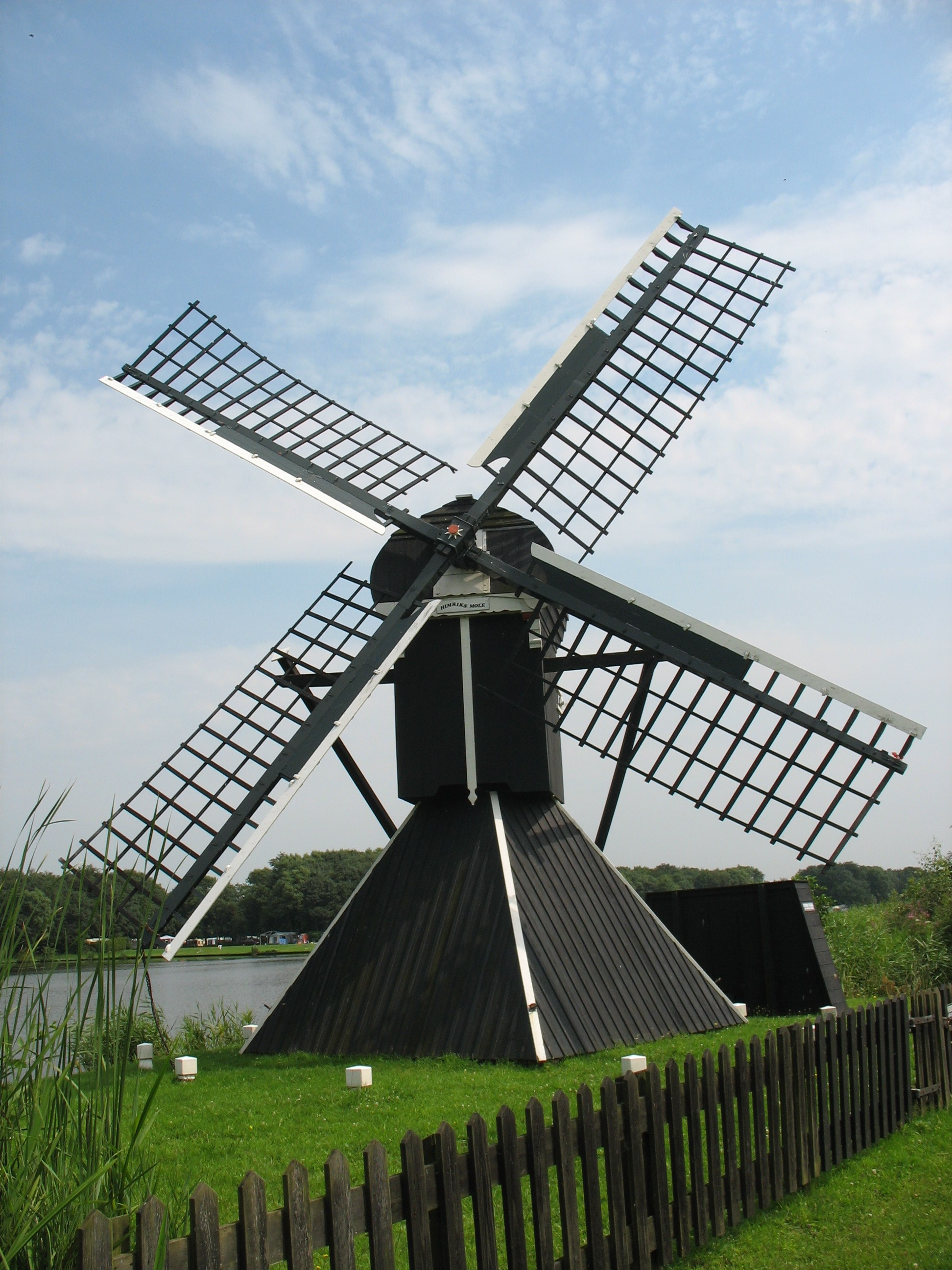
De Himriksmole, Tytsjerk, July 2008

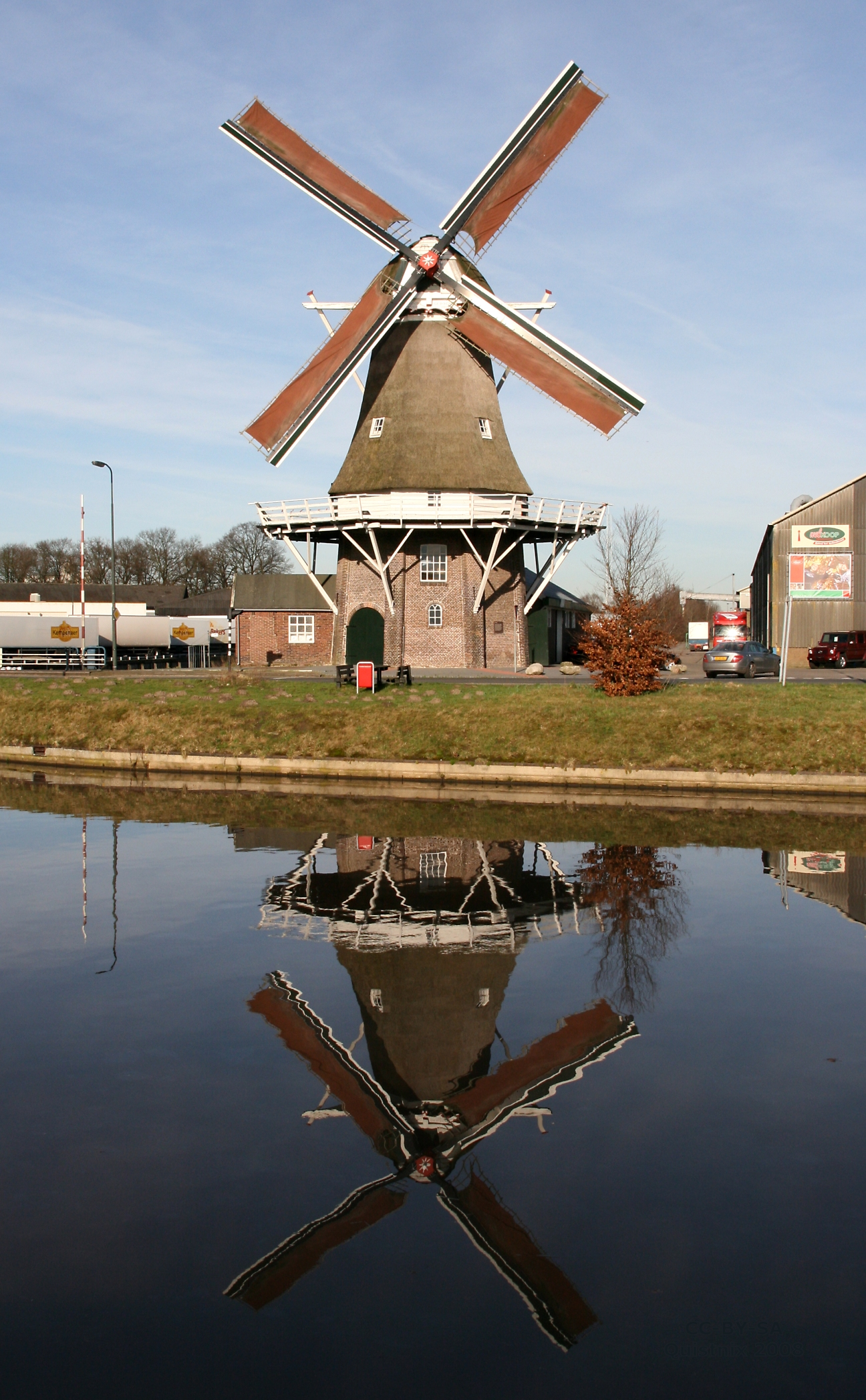
Nooitgedacht, Veenoord

=== De Phenix ===
De Phenix (English: The Phoenix) stood on the site of De Hersteller, to the south of the Zuidvliet between the Looiersbrug and the Bakkersbrug at 53°12′08″N 5°48′55″E. The mill was a sawmill. In 1917 it was moved to Marrum, where it stands today known as De Phenix, converted to a drainage mill.

=== De Jonge ===
De Jonge (English: The Boy) was a stellingmolen which was built in 1871. It stood on the Harlinger Trekvaart to the west of De Kat at 53°11′51″N 5°47′10″E. It was an oil mill. A steam engine was installed in 1878. In 1887, the mill was moved to Marle, Overijssel, where it was converted to a corn mill. The mill survives and is known as De Vlijt.

=== Himriksmolen ===
The Himriksmolen was a spinnenkopmolen which was built in 1830 close to the Woudmansdiep at 53°11′42″N 5°50′59″E. It was a drainage mill. Replaced by a pumphouse in 1948, the mill was moved to Ryptsjerk in 1952, where it stood at 53°13′09″N 5°53′32″E. On 13 November 1972, the mill was badly damaged in a storm. It was moved to Tytsjerk in 1976, where the mill stood to the south of the Lytse Wielen at 53°12′43″N 5°53′06″E. Due to boundary changes the mill's location became part of Leeuwarden, and then reverted to Tytsjerk. On 30 June 1995, the mill was burnt down in an arson attack. The mill was restored in 1996, and is known as De Himriksmole or De Groene Ster.

=== Huizumer en Goutumer Nieuwlandmolen ===
The Huizumer en Goutumer Nieuwlandmolen was a grondzeiler which was built in 1850 to drain the Huizumer en Goutumer Nieuland polders, which had a combined area of 350 acres (140 ha). The mill stood about 1 kilometre (1,100 yd) to the south west of Leeuwarden railway station at 53°11′15″N 5°46′00″E. In 1962, the mill was moved to a new site within Leeuwarden, where it is known as the Froskepôlemolen.

=== Molen aan de Nieuwe Kanaal ===
A stellingmolen was built in 1732 by the Nieuwe Kanaal, which is now known as the Emmakade, at 53°12′10″N 5°49′37″E. It was a barley mill, and later an oil mill and bark mill. Last recorded at Leeuwarden in 1786, the mill was later moved to Heerenveen, where it was known as De Fortuyn. The mill was moved to Hankate, Overijssel in 1892, taking the name Molen van Kappert. In 1916, the mill was moved to Veenoord, Drenthe, and took the name Nooitdgedacht. The mill still stands in Veenoord.

== Vanished windmills ==
=== Cammingha-Buurstermolen ===
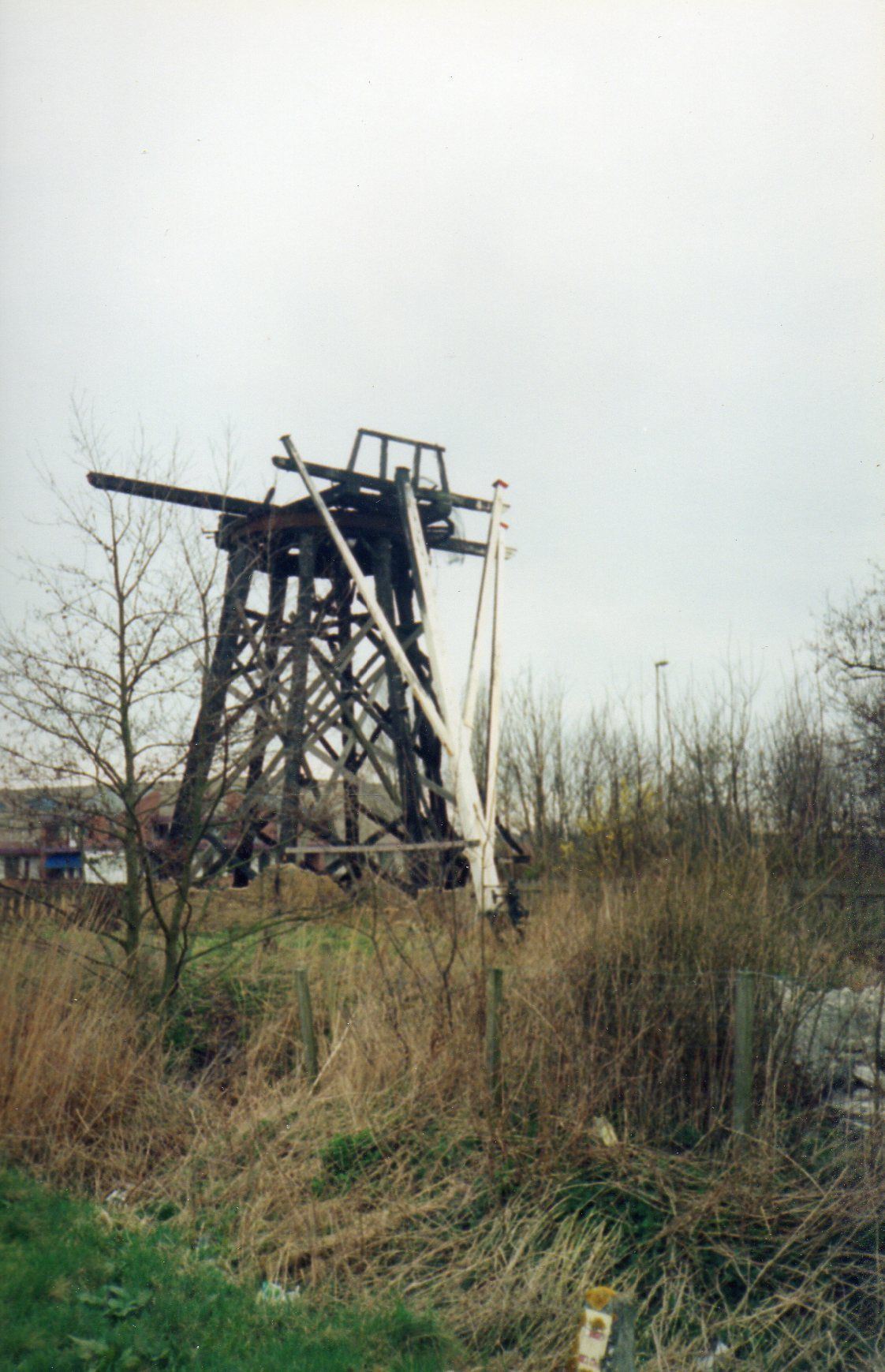
The Cammingha-Buurtstermolen mill in January 1998

The Cammingha-Buurstermolen was a grondzeiler which was built in 1850 along the Kalverdijkje at 53°12′40″N 5°49′40″E. The mill was working until 1947 when a 12 horsepower (8.9 kW) electric motor was installed. In 1958, the mill was bought by the Gemeente Leeuwarden for ƒ5. It was restored by millwright De Roos of Leeuwarden. The sails were removed the early 1990s. On 11 May 1994, the mill was the victim of an arson attack. The remains of the mill were demolished in 2000.

=== De Arend (standerdmolen) ===
The first mill on this site was a standerdmolen which was moved from the Noordvliet in 1621. Located on the city walls at Vrouwenpoortsdwinger, 53°12′06″N 5°47′16″E. It was still standing in 1664.

=== De Arend (stellingmolen) ===
The standerdmolen was later replaced by a stellingmolen on the same site (53°12′06″N 5°47′16″E) which served as a corn mill. It was called De Arend (English: The Eagle). The mill was purchased by the Gemeente Leeuwarden in 1895 and demolished in 1901. It was the last windmill to stand on the city walls.

=== De Basuin ===
De Basuin was a stellingmolen which was built in 1849 to the south of the railway station at the junction of Hollanderwijk and Wassenberghstraat, 53°11′45″N 5°47′39″E. The mill was a corn and barley mill. It was demolished in 1913, leaving the base standing. This was demolished in September 1978.

=== De Boer, De Hersteller ===
De Boer (English: The Farmer), also known as De Hersteller (English: The Repairer) stood to the south of the Zuidvliet between the Looiersbrug and the Bakkersbrug at 53°12′08″N 5°48′55″E. The mill was built in 1672. it was known as De Boer until 1823, then De Hersteller until 1848, when it burnt down. It was replaced by a new stellingmolen which was named De Phenix or De Phoenix.

=== De Drie Gouden Kronen ===
De Drie Gouden Kronen (English: The Three Gold Crowns) was a stellingmolen which was built in 1770. It was an oil mill. The mill stood on the east side of the Dokkumer Ee at 53°13′17″N 5°48′29″E. A steam engine was added in 1881 and the mill was demolished in 1891. The foundation stone of the mill has been preserved.

=== De Eendracht (1st sawmill) ===
The first sawmill named De Eendracht was a stellingmolen which was built between 1718 and 1739. The mill stood on the Schenkenschans, to the south side of the Harlinger Trekvaart at 53°11′54″N 5°34′45″E. The mill burnt down on 18 May 1878.

=== De Eendracht (2nd sawmill) ===
The second sawmill named De Eendracht was a stellingmolen which originally stood at Zaandam-Oost, North Holland where it had been built in 1787 and was a sawmill known as De Bakker (English: The Baker). It replaced the earlier mill which had burnt down, standing on the same site, 53°11′54″N 5°34′45″E. It was demolished in 1919.

=== De Eenhorn, Wijninghahornster Mollen, Dye Molen voor Wirdumerpoerte ===
De Eenhorn English: The Unicorn) was a standerdmolen. The first mention of a mill on this site was in 1496, when it was known as the Wijninghahornster Mollen In 1516, the mill was in use as a dye mill, then being known as the Dye Molen voor Wirdumerpoerte. By 1582, the mill was in use as a corn mill. It stood to the east of De Rosenboom at 53°11′47″N 5°47′51″E. The rye and wheat mill De Eenhorn was sold in June 1837, this being the last evidence of its existence.

=== De Fortuin (standerdmolen) ===
A standerdmolen originally stood on this site, which lies on De Wirdumerpoortsdwinger at 53°11′55″N 5°34′45″E. It was a corn mill built between 1580 and 1603. The mill was demolished c1760 and replaced with a stellingmolen.

=== De Fortuin (stellingmolen) ===
The stellingmolen known as De Fortuin (English: The Fortune}) was also a corn mill. It was moved within Leeuwarden in 1873, taking the name Het Fortuin at its new site.

=== De Herderin, De Blauwe Molen ===
This stellingmolen was moved from Zaanstreek, North Holland in 1830. There, it was a paper mill known as De Herderin (English: The Shepherdess). The mill was also known as De Blauwe Molen (English: The Blue Mill) due to it having been moved to Leeuwarden by a millwright by the name of De Blauwe. Its site is to the west of the Cambuur Stadion at 53°12′20″N 5°48′41″E. The mill was an oil mill, it was moved c1892 to Minnertsga, where it was a corn mill known as De Welkomst (English: The Welcome). The mill was demolished in 1947.

=== De Hersteller ===
De Hersteller (English: The Repairer) was a stellingmolen which was built in 1819. It was a saw mill which stood on the Schenkenschans, on the west side of De Zwette at 53°11′51″N 5°46′04″E. The mill was demolished in 1903.

=== De Hoop, Groote Weijdmolen, 's Pinsenweitmolen ===
The first mill on this site was a standerdmolen which had been moved from Het Schravernek in 1624. De Hoop was a stellingmolen which was a corn mill. It was also known as Groote Weijdmolen or 's Prinsenweitmolen. The mill stood behind the De Arend theatre at 53°11′58″N 5°47′21″E. It was demolished in 1885.

=== Deinumerpoldermolen ===
The Deinumerpoldermolen or Deinumer Nieuwmanspoldermolen was a grondzeiler which was built in 1774 by millwright Frans Beernts of Leeuwarden to drain the approximately 185 hectares (460 acres) Deinumer Nieumanspolder. The mill stood on the Zwette, 3 kilometres (1.9 mi) to the east of the church on the Snekervaart at 53°11′36″N 5°46′01″E. in 1916, an electric motor was installed. The mill was demolished in 1918 and an electrically driven pump was erected in its place.

=== De Jong Fenix (forerunner) ===
A standerdmolen was moved from within Leeuwarden c1642. It stood on the Zuidvliet at 53°12′09″N 5°48′43″E. The mill was a corn mill, it burnt down in 1752.

=== De Jong Fenix, De Stenen Molen ===
De Jong Fenix (English: The Young Phoenix) was a stellingmolen which served as a bark mill, and oil mill and a cement mill. The mill was built in 1752 on the site of the post mill which had burnt down (53°12′09″N 5°48′43″E). It was also known as De Stenen Molen (English: The Brick Mill). The mill was demolished in 1904, but the foundation stone has been preserved and can be seen in the Fries Museum, Leeuwarden.

=== De Kat ===
De Kat (English: The Cat) was a stellingmolen which was built in 1699 as a barley mill. It stood on the Harlinger Trekvaart at 53°11′51″N 5°47′00″E. In 1739, the mill was rebuilt as an oil mill. It was demolished in 1903.

=== De Kroon ===
De Kroon (English: The Crown) was a stellingmolen which was built in 1760 as a snuff and paint mill. It stood near the mouth of the Nieuw Kanaal at 53°12′06″N 5°49′42″E. The mill was converted to a gunpowder and oil mill. In 1822 it was used only as an oil mill. It was demolished in 1914.

=== De Kroon, De Steenbikmolen ===
De Kroon or De Steenbikmolen was a stellingmolen which was built between 1884 and 1887. It stood on the Hollanderdijk close to De Schrans at 53°11′47″N 5°47′45″E. The mill was probably a drainage mill originally, but was later converted to a stamping mill. The mill was standing in 1896 but was struck by lightning at an unknown date, losing its sails. The mill was then demolished, it had gone by 1905.

=== De Leeuw (standerdmolen) ===
The first mill on the site occupied by De Leeuw was a standerdmolen built in 1622. The mill stood on the Oldhoofsterdwinger at 53°12′14″N 5°47′19″E. It burnt down in 1689.

=== De Leeuw (stellingmolen) ===
In 1690, a stellingmolen was erected in the place of the mill which had burnt down (53°12′14″N 5°47′19″E). This mill was known as De Leeuw; (English: The Lion). The mill was bought by the Gemeente Leeuwarden in 1882 and demolished that same year.

=== De Morgenster ===
De Morgenster (English: The Morning Star) was a stellingmolen which was built in 1842 to replace a horse mill. It stood on the Zuidvliet at 53°12′07″N 5°48′38″E. The mill was a chicory, rye, and barley mill, as well as a drainage mill. It was demolished in 1861, and probably moved to an unknown location.

=== De Paltrok, De Poltrok ===
The eponymous De Paltrok or De Poltrok was a paltrokmolen which was built between 1718 and 1735. It stood on De Schenkenschans, along the Harlinger Trekvaart at 53°11′53″N 5°46′02″E. The mill was a sawmill it was demolished in 1812.

=== De Rosenboom (standerdmolen) ===
The first mill on the site later occupied by De Rosenboom was a standerdmolen which was marked on a map dated 1664. It stood on the west side of the Rijksweg at 53°11′48″N 5°47′47″E. The mill was demolished c1750, and replaced by an achtkantmolen, which was built in 1751.

=== De Rosenboom (achtkantmolen) ===
De Rosenboom (English: The Rose Tree) was an achtkantmolen, which stood on the west side of the Rijksweg at 53°11′48″N 5°47′47″E. The mill was demolished in 1862 as it lay on the route of the railway that was being built between Leeuwarden and Groningen. The mill was moved to Hantum, where it was known as De Rosenboom. On 1 March 1949, the cap and sails were blown off the mill. In 1958, the smock was placed on the ground and used as a garage and store. It was demolished in 1970. A millstone from De Rosenboom is preserved in De Hoop, Holwerd.

=== De Visser, De Visker, Molen de Van de Wint, Molen van Timmermans ===
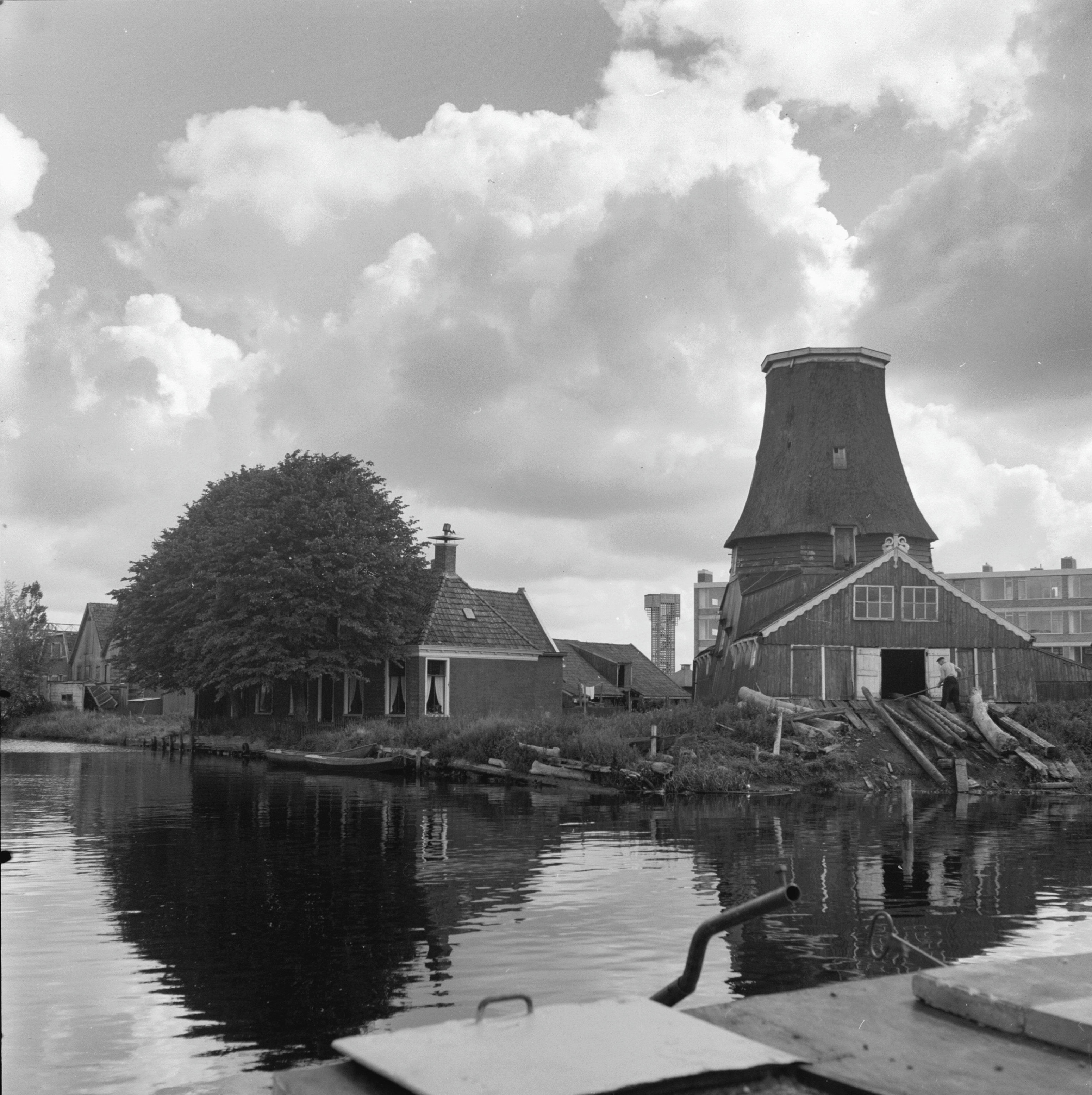
De Visser, 1963.

A windmill was built on this site in 1662. This mill had a wooden windshaft. It was probably replaced in 1740 by a new mill. De Visser or De Fisker (English: The Fisherman) was a stellingmolen. It was named after its owners, who were the Fiske family in the mid-nineteenth century. It stood in Oldegalileën, along the Dokkummer Ee at 53°12′44″N 5°48′09″E. The mill was later owned by De Wint from 1871. The mill was dismantled in 1910, and a 38 horsepower (28 kW) electric motor installed. The smock was left standing. De Wint died in 1933, and the mill was owned by Timmermans in 1947. On 16 January 1964, the mill was burnt down, although at the time there were plans to demolish it as it stood on the route of a bypass that was planned to be built around Leeuwarden.

=== De Vrijheid, De Hoop, Het Haantje ===
De Vrijheid (English: The Freedom) was a stellingmolen which was standing in 1664. It stood to the north of the Noordvliet at 53°12′10″N 5°49′04″E. Originally a sawmill, it was rebuilt as an oil mill in 1798, and was then known as Het Haantje (English: The Cockerel). The mill was also known as De Hoop (English: The Hope). A 15 horsepower (11 kW) steam engine was installed in 1871. The mill burnt down in 1884.

=== Eekmolen van het Gild de Groote Looijers ===
This windmill stood on the Noordvliet at approximately 53°12′10″N 5°48′55″E. Built before 1664, this bark mill was standing in 1680 but had been demolished by 1718. The mill was owned by Het Gild de Groote Looijers (English: The Guild of Great Tanners) in 1680.

=== Het Fortuin ===
Het Fortuin (English: The Fortune) was a stellingmolen that was moved here in 1873. It stood along the Harlinger Trekvaart between De Kat and De Jong at 53°11′51″N 5°34′45″E and was a corn mill. A 15 horsepower (11 kW) steam engine was installed in 1883. The mill burnt down on 24 March 1886, leaving the base standing. In 1888, a steam-powered factory was erected, but the windmill was not replaced. The base survived until c1900.

=== Het Fortuin, Oude Molen ===
A windmill was marked on a map of 1685 in the position later occupied by Het Fortuin. It was then known as the Oude Molen (English: Old Mill), and possibly was of sixteenth century date. The mill stood close to Emmakade on the Nieuwe Kanaal at53°12′09″N 5°49′34″E. Originally an oil mill, in 1786 the mill was a bark mill. The stellingmolen was standing in 1895.

=== Het Lam (1st site, standerdmolen) ===
A standerdmolen stood on this site in 1595. It was a corn, rye and buckwheat mill. It stood on the Hoeksterdwinger at 53°12′23″N 5°48′11″E. The mill was demolished c1790.

=== Het Lam (1st site, stellingmolen) ===
Het Lam (English: The Lamb) was a stellingmolen which was built in 1791 on the site of the standerdmolen demolished c1790 (53°12′23″N 5°48′11″E). Het Lam was a corn and buckwheat mill. The mill was badly damaged in a storm in 1829. It was moved to a new site within Leeuwarden in 1830.

=== Het Lam (2nd site) ===
Het Lam was rebuilt at a new site in 1830. it stood on the Westerbuitensingel at 53°12′08″N 5°47′10″E. A gas engine was installed in 1898, and in 1901 the mill was one of the first in Friesland equipped with Patent sails, which were fitted by millwright J H Westra of Franeker. The mill was a corn and barley mill. It was demolished in 1919, leaving the lower part of the base standing. This was demolished in 1988.

=== Kleijne Weijdemolen ===
The Kleijne Weijdemolen was a standerdmolen which stood on the Amelandsdwinger at 53°12′16″N 5°48′17″E. The mill was a corn mill. It was demolished in 1752.

=== Korenmolen aan het Vliet ===
This standerdmolen was built before 1565 on the Noordvliet at 53°12′11″N 5°48′24″E. It was a corn mill, which was moved to Vrouwenpoortsdwinger in 1621, where it stood on the site later occupied by De Arend.

=== Korenmolen van de Leeuwarder Blokhuis ===
A mill of unknown type was built in 1547 to replace a horse mill. The mill was a corn mill, it stood on the Oosterkade at approximately 53°11′59″N 5°48′07″E.

=== Leermolen aan het Vliet ===
An achtkantmolen was standing in 1685 to the south of Het Vliet. The mill was a bark mill, it stood to the south of Het Vliet at 53.202295°N 5.820821°E. It was advertised for sale in 1841, described as suitable to be moved. The base was standing in 1887.

=== Leermolen van Claas Feddes ===
This mill was probably an achtkantmolen. It was standing in 1685. Located on the Noordvliet at 53.202925°N 5.820408°E, the mill was a bark mill originally, but was an oil mill in 1786. It was standing in 1832 but had gone by 1850.

=== Molen op het Schravernek ===
A standerdmolen was standing in 1565 on the Schravernek at 53°12′03″N 5°47′21″E. It was moved in 1624 to a site in Leeuwarden later occupied by De Hoop.

=== Molen van Baron Rengers ===
This spinnenkopmolen stood on Kalverdijkje at 53°12′34″N 5°49′43″E. It was a drainage mill. The first mention of the mill was in 1832 and it was still standing in 1850.

=== Molen van Cornelis Westra (I) ===
This spinnenkopmolen stood on the corner on Insulidestraat and Timorstraat at 53°12′16″N 5°49′00″E. It was a drainage mill. The first mention of the mill was in 1832 and it was still standing in 1850.

=== Molen van Cornelis Westra (II) ===
This spinnenkopmolen stood to the north of Esdoornstraat at 53°12′17″N 5°49′12″E. It was a drainage mill. The first mention of the mill was in 1832 and it was still standing in 1850.

=== Molen van Dirk Jonker ===
This spinnenkopmolen stood to the north of Schilkampen at 53°12′11″N 5°49′53″E. It was a drainage mill. The first mention of the mill was in 1832 and it was still standing in 1850.

=== Molen van Douwe van der Kooi ===
This mill of unknown type stood to the north of Jonkersleane at 53°10′53″N 5°48′53″E. It was a drainage mill. The first mention of the mill was in 1832 and it was demolished c1850.

=== Molen van Hermanus Wesselius ===
This mill of unknown type stood to the south of Sleutelbloem at 53°11′12″N 5°49′41″E. It was a drainage mill. The first mention of the mill was in 1832 and it was demolished c1880.

=== Molen van Justinus Rengers ===
This Spinnenkopmolen stood to the south of Canadezenlaan at 53°12′55″N 5°34′52″E. It was a drainage mill. The first mention of the mill was in 1832 and it was still standing in 1930.

=== Molen van Klaas Tigler ===
This mill of unknown type stood to the west of Neptunusweg at 53°11′55″N 5°50′03″E. It was a drainage mill. The first mention of the mill was in 1832 and it was still standing in 1850.

=== Molen van Pieter Cats ===
This Spinnenkopmolen stood to the north of Kalverdijkje at 53°12′48″N 5°49′34″E. It was a drainage mill. The first mention of the mill was in 1832 and it had been demolished by 1850.

=== Molen van Tiete Tromp ===
This Spinnenkopmolen stood to the east of Lekkumerweg at 53°13′05″N 5°49′22″E. It was a drainage mill. The first mention of the mill was in 1832 and it had been demolished by 1850.

=== Molen van Tjeerd Kastra ===
This mill of unknown type stood to the east of Rietgras at 53°11′15″N 5°48′37″E. It was a drainage mill. The first mention of the mill was in 1832 and it may have been still standing in 1850.

=== Pelmolen van Gerrit Gorter ===
This mill was probably an achtkantmolen. It stood to the east of the Dokkumer Ee at 53°12′54″N 5°48′21″E. It was a barley mill. The mill was built between 1685 and 1700. In 1856 it was converted to a corn mill. A steam engine was installed in 1872 and it was demolished c1885.

=== Pelmolen van Jentje Wijbrandt ===
This mill was a wipstellingmolen. It stood to the west of the Dokkumer Ee at 53°12′56″N 5°48′20″E. It was a barley mill. The mill was built between 1685 and 1718. In 1882 it was demolished as a steam-powered mill had been erected.

=== Pelmolen van Tiede Dijkstra ===
This mill was a wipstellingmolen. It stood to the east of the Dokkumer Ee at 53°13′00″N 5°48′26″E. It was a barley mill. The mill was built in 1742. In 1847 it was converted to an oil mill, and then to a corn mill in 1855. It burnt down in 1889.

=== Poldermolen Het Wirdumer Nieuwland ===
Poldermolen Het Wirdumer Nieuwland was a grondzeiler which was built to the west of the Barrahusterdyk at 53°09′44″N 5°46′48″E. The mill was built before 1832. It was still standing in 1929.

=== Poldermolen Nr.10 ===
This spinnenkopmolen stood on the south side of the Jelsumer Feart at 53°13′31″N 5°47′33″E. It was a drainage mill. The first mention of the mill was in 1832 and it was still standing in 1850.

=== Poldermolen Nr.11 ===
This grondzeiler stood to the south of the Jelsumervaart at 53°13′27″N 5°48′15″E. It was a drainage mill. The first mention of the mill was in 1832 and it was demolished in 1949.

=== Poldermolen Nr.12 ===
This Spinnenkopmolen stood to the south of Vierhuisterweg at 53°13′06″N 5°47′50″E. It was a drainage mill. The first mention of the mill was in 1832 and had been demolished by 1850.

=== Poldermolen Nr.12a ===
This mill of unknown type stood to the west of Havanklaan at 53°13′09″N 5°48′11″E. It was a drainage mill. The first mention of the mill was in 1854 and had been demolished by 1926.

=== Poldermolen Nr. 15 ===
Poldermolen Nr. 15 was a spinnenkopmolen which was built to the south east of the Gronigerstraatweg at 53°12′52″N 5°49′25″E. The mill was built before 1832 and had been demolished by 1928.

=== Poldermolen Nr. 16 ===
Poldermolen Nr. 16 was a spinnenkopmolen which was built to the north of Iepenstraat at 53°12′30″N 5°49′16″E. The mill was built before 1832 and was demolished by 1933.

=== Poldermolen Nr. 16a ===
Poldermolen Nr. 16a was a spinnenkopmolen which was built to the east of Vogelkersstraat at 53°12′29″N 5°49′14″E. The mill was built before 1832 and was still standing in 1928.

=== Poldermolen Nr.17 ===
This mill of unknown type stood to the south of Koopmansstraat at 53°12′23″N 5°48′57″E. It was a drainage mill. The first mention of the mill was in 1832 and it was still standing in 1850.

=== Poldermolen Nr.18 ===
This Spinnenkopmolen stood to the west of Cederstraat at 53°12′17″N 5°49′23″E. It was a drainage mill. The first mention of the mill was in 1832 and it was still standing in 1930.

=== Poldermolen Nr. 19 ===
Poldermolen Nr. 19 was a spinnenkopmolen which was built to the south of Kalverdijkje at 53°12′22″N 5°49′42″E. The mill was built before 1832 and was still standing in 1930.

=== Poldermolen Nr.19a ===
This mill of unknown type stood to the west of Schieringerweg at 53°12′28″N 5°49′31″E. It was a drainage mill. The first mention of the mill was in 1832 and it was still standing in 1850.

=== Poldermolen Nr. 20 ===
Poldermolen Nr. 20 was a spinnenkopmolen which was built to the west of Anne Vondelingweg at 53°12′07″N 5°49′56″E. The mill was built before 1832. It was badly damaged in a storm on 1 March 1949.

=== Poldermolen Nr. 21 ===
Poldermolen Nr. 21 was a monniksmolen which was built to the north of DE Merodestraat at 53°12′03″N 5°49′20″E. The mill was built before 1832. It was demolished in 1894.

=== Poldermolen Nr.21a ===
This Spinnenkopmolen stood to the south of Emmakade at 53°11′59″N 5°48′56″E. It was a drainage mill. The first mention of the mill was in 1832 and it probably demolished c1894 when the Nieuwe Vaart was constructed.

=== Poldermolen Nr.21b ===
This mill of unknown type stood on the east side of Schouwstraat at 53°11′49″N 5°49′12″E. It was a drainage mill. The first mention of the mill was in 1832 and it was demolished prior to 1930.

=== Poldermolen Nr. 22, Cammingasterpoldermolen ===
Poldermolen Nr. 22 or the Cammingasterpoldermolen was a spinnenkopmolen which was built alongside the Kalverdijkje at 53°12′16″N 5°50′09″E. The mill was built before 1832 and burnt down c1948. It latterly worked with on pair of Common sails and one pair of Patent sails.

=== Poldermolen Nr.23 ===
This mill of unknown type stood to the sest of Neptunusweg at 53°11′55″N 5°50′05″E. It was a drainage mill. The first mention of the mill was in 1832 and it had been demolished by 1926.

=== Poldermolen Nr.24 ===
This mill of unknown type stood to the south of Mercuriusweg at 53°11′52″N 5°50′55″E. It was a drainage mill. The first mention of the mill was in 1832 and it was still standing in 1850.

=== Poldermolen Nr. 25, Molen van de Potmargepolders ===
Poldermolen Nr. 25 or the Molen van de Potmargepolders was a spinnenkopmolen which stood on the north side of the Oude Potmarge at 53°11′43″N 5°49′31″E. The mill was built before 1832 and was demolished in August 1929.

=== Poldermole Nr.26 ===
This mill of unknown type stood to the south of Planetenlaan at 53°11′36″N 5°50′32″E. It was a drainage mill. The first mention of the mill was in 1832 and it was still standing in 1930.

=== Poldermolen Nr.27, Boonstra's Polder Molen ===
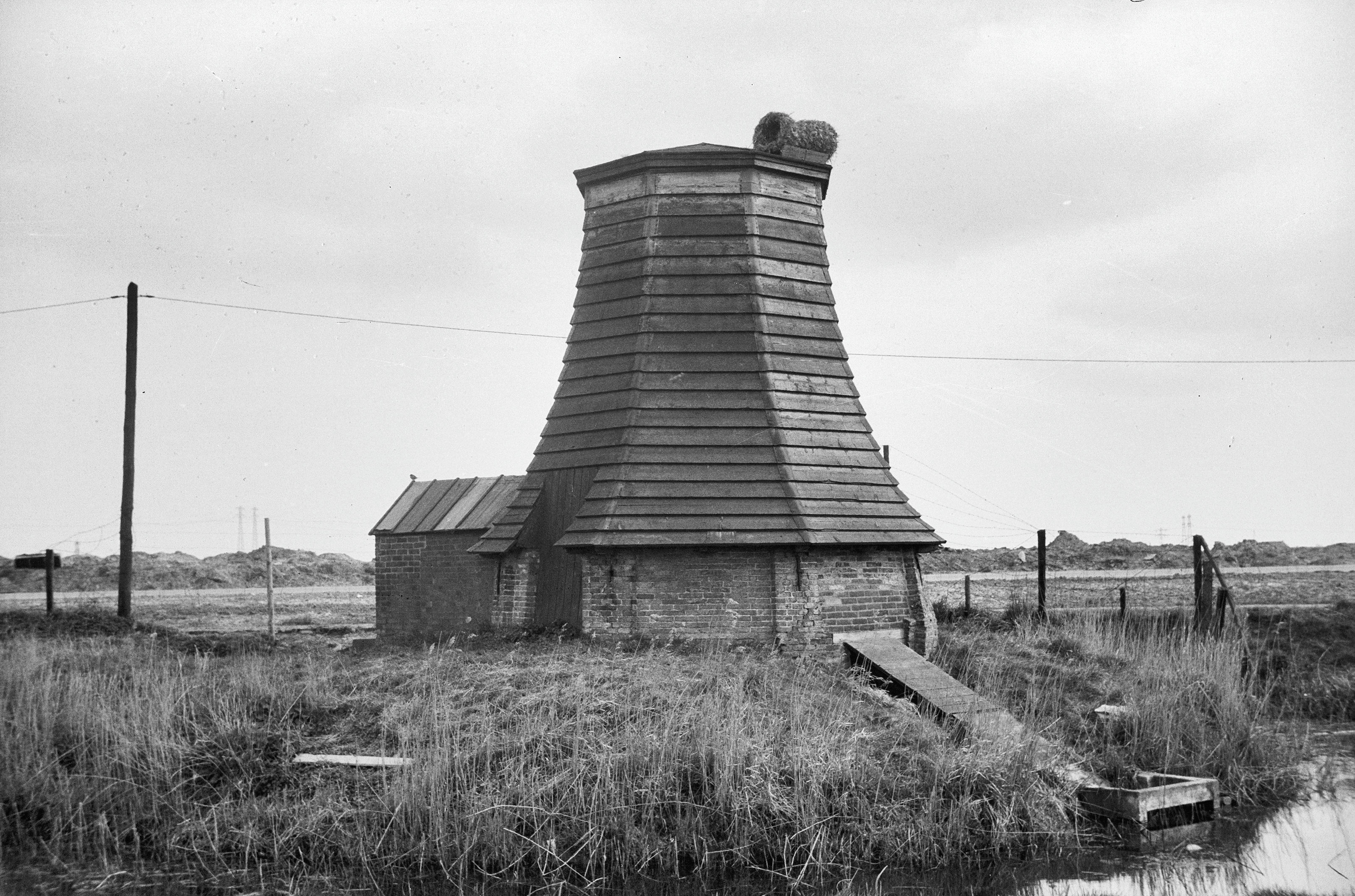
Boonstra's Polder Molen, March 1971.

Poldermolen Nr.27 or Boonstra's Polder Molen was a grondzeiler which was built before 1832 to the north of Holstmeerweg at 53°11′32″N 5°49′28″E. The mill was dismantled in 1937 after an 8 horsepower (6.0 kW) electric motor had been installed. The remains of the mill were still standing in May 1978, but had been cleared by 1995, when Friese Molens was published.

=== Poldermolen Nr. 27a ===
Poldermolen Nr. 27 was a spinnenkopmolen which was built to the south of Tijnedijk at 53°11′38″N 5°49′57″E. The mill was built before 1832 and it was still standing in 1928.

=== Poldermolen Nr.28 ===
This mill of unknown type stood to the west of Waterbies at 53°11′29″N 5°50′10″E. It was a drainage mill. The first mention of the mill was in 1832. It had been replaced by a windmotor by 1930.

=== Poldermolen Nr. 29 ===
Poldermolen Nr. 29 was a spinnenkopmolen which was built to the east of Neptunusweg at 53°12′07″N 5°49′56″E. The mill was built before 1832. It was demolished c1951.

=== Poldermolen Nr.30 ===
This mill of unknown type stood on Froskepôle at 53°11′21″N 5°50′36″E. It was a drainage mill. The first mention of the mill was in 1832 and it was still standing in 1850.

=== Poldermolen Nr. 30a ===
Poldermolen Nr. 30a was a spinnenkopmolen which was built to the south of the Nieuwe Vaart at 53°11′16″N 5°50′31″E. The mill was built before 1832. It was demolished c1929.

=== Poldermolen Nr.31, Old Feitmanspolder Molen ===
This grondzeiler stood to the north of the Nieuwe Vaart at 53°11′12″N 5°49′41″E. It was a drainage mill. The mill was built in 1880 and it was demolished c1975.

=== Poldermolen Nr.32 ===
This mill of unknown type stood to the north of the Oude Potmarge at 53°11′09″N 5°49′11″E. It was a drainage mill. The first mention of the mill was in 1832 and it was still standing in 1850.

=== Poldermolen Nr.33 ===
This mill of unknown type stood to the north of Pikemar at 53°10′57″N 5°50′15″E. It was a drainage mill. The first mention of the mill was in 1832 and it was still standing in 1850.

=== Poldermolen Nr. 34, Teernserpoldermolen ===
Poldermolen Nr. 34 or the Teernserpoldermolen was a grondzeiler which was built to the west of Nauwe Greuns at 53°10′56″N 5°50′07″E. An earlier mill may have stood here between 1832 and 1854. The date that the mill was built is unknown. It was dismantled in 1948 and the smock was demolished in 1975.

=== Poldermolen Nr. 35 ===
Poldermolen Nr. 35 was an achtkantmolen which was built to the north of Jonkersleane at 53°10′53″N 5°48′53″E. An earlier mill stood on the site in 1811. The mill was built c1850. It was demolished in 1915.

=== Poldermolen Nr.36 ===
This mill of unknown type stood to the south of Jonkersleane at 53°10′51″N 5°48′43″E. It was a drainage mill. The first mention of the mill was in 1832 and it was still standing in 1850.

=== Poldermolen Nr. 36 ===
Poldermolen Nr. 36 was a spinnenkopmolen which was built to the west of the Wirdummervaart, a little to the north of Goutum. The mill was built before 1864. It was demolished in the winter of 1928/29.

=== Poldermolen Nr.37 ===
This mill of unknown type stood on Ublingerplantage at 53°10′45″N 5°49′06″E. It was a drainage mill. The first mention of the mill was in 1832 and it was still standing in 1850.

=== Poldermolen Nr.38 ===
This mill of unknown type stood on Pikemar at 53°10′58″N 5°50′28″E. It was a drainage mill. The first mention of the mill was in 1832 and it was still standing in 1850.

=== Poldermolen Nr.39 ===
This mill of unknown type stood to the south of Glinswei at 53°10′50″N 5°50′14″E. It was a drainage mill. The first mention of the mill was in 1832 and it was still standing in 1850.

=== Poldermolen Nr. 40 ===
Poldermolen Nr. 40 was a spinnenkopmolen which was built to the west of Hounsdijk at 53°10′30″N 5°48′57″E. The mill was built before 1832. It was standing in 1929.

=== Poldermolen Nr. 40a ===
Poldermolen Nr. 40a was a spinnenkopmolen which was built to the east of Wergeasterdijk at 53°10′31″N 5°48′38″E. The mill was built before 1832. It was standing in 1929.

=== Poldermolen Nr. 41 ===
Poldermolen Nr. 41 was a spinnenkopmolen which was built to the south of Himpenserdijk at 53°10′47″N 5°49′43″E. The mill was built before 1832. It was demolished in 1972, leaving the base standing. This was demolished in 2000.

=== Poldermolen Nr.42 ===
This spinnenkopmolen stood on Sloalledyk at 53°10′44″N 5°50′15″E. It was a drainage mill. The first mention of the mill was in 1832 and it was still standing in 1850.

=== Poldermolen Nr.42 ===
This mill of unknown type stood on the south side of the Nieuwe Vaart at 53°12′03″N 5°49′20″E. It was a drainage mill. The first mention of the mill was in 1832 and it was demolished in 1892.

=== Poldermolen Nr.43 ===
This mill of unknown type stood to the east of Langelaan at 53°10′44″N 5°50′52″E. It was a drainage mill. The first mention of the mill was in 1832 and it was still standing in 1850.

=== Poldermolen Nr. 44 ===
Poldermolen Nr. 44 was a spinnenkopmolen which was built to the east of the Nauwe Greuns at 53°10′14″N 5°50′31″E. The mill was built before 1832. It had been demolished by 1928.

=== Poldermolen Nr.44a ===
This mill of unknown type stood on Suderbuorren at 53°10′34″N 5°50′24″E. It was a drainage mill. The first mention of the mill was in 1832 and it was still standing in 1850.

=== Poldermolen Nr. 45 ===
Poldermolen Nr. 45 was a spinnenkopmolen which was built to the west of Suderbuorren at 53°10′34″N 5°50′24″E. The mill was built before 1832. It was still standing in 1926.

=== Poldermolen Nr. 45 ===
Poldermolen Nr. 45 was a spinnenkopmolen which was built to the west of the Nauwe Greuns at 53°10′27″N 5°50′17″E. An earlier mill was marked on a map of 1832. The date this mill was built is not known, but may have been c1850. It had been demolished by 1928.

=== Poldermolen Nr. 46 ===
Poldermolen Nr. 46 was a spinnenkopmolen which was built to the south of the Nauwe Greuns at 53°10′13″N 5°50′33″E. The mill was built before 1832. It had been demolished by 1928.

=== Poldermolen Nr. 48 ===
Poldermolen Nr. 48 was a spinnenkopmolen which was built to the north of the Waldwei at 53°10′04″N 5°49′17″E. The mill was built before 1832. It was still standing in 1929.

=== Poldermolen Nr. 49 ===
Poldermolen Nr. 49 was a mill of unknown type which was built to the north of the Waldwei at 53°10′11″N 5°49′03″E. The mill was built before 1832. It was demolished c1928.

=== Poldermolen Nr. 50 ===
Poldermolen Nr. 50 was a spinnenkopmolen which was built to the north of the Waldwei at 53°10′05″N 5°48′51″E. The mill was built after 1850. It was still standing in 1929.

=== Poldermolen Nr. 50a ===
Poldermolen Nr. 50a was a mill of unknown type which was built to the south of the Waldwei at 53°09′40″N 5°48′29″E. The mill was built between 1832 and 1850. It was still standing in 1929.

=== Poldermolen Nr. 50b ===
Poldermolen Nr. 50b was a spinnenkopmolen which was built to the south of the Waldwei at 53°09′44″N 5°49′07″E. The mill was built after 1850. It was still standing in 1930.

=== Poldermolen Nr. 51 ===
Poldermolen Nr. 51 was a spinnenkopmolen which was built to the north of the Waldwei at 53°09′57″N 5°49′02″E. The mill was built between 1832 and 1850. It was still standing in 1929.

=== Zaagmolen van Jildert Romein ===
This saw mill was a stellingmolen which was built to the west of Camstraburen at 53°12′32″N 5°47′52″E. The mill was built in 1840 and was burnt down in 1858.

=== Unnamed mills ===
A standerdmolen was built to the north of Leeuwarden before 1565 and stood until at least 1786. It was a corn mill. Its location was 53°12′24″N 5°48′01″E.

A standerdmolen was built to the north of Leeuwarden before 1565 and stood until at least 1718, but had gone by 1786. The mill was a corn and barley mill. Its location was 53°12′25″N 5°48′00″E.

A mill of unknown type was built between 1565 and 1603 on the Oosterkade at 53°12′04″N 5°48′09″E. The mill may have been a corn mill. It had been demolished by 1622.

A mill of unknown type was built c1603 and removed by 1616. In 1638, an oil mill was noted as standing on this site, which lies behind De Beurs today at 53°11′55″N 5°47′45″E. This mill had been moved by 1642 to a new site in Leeuwarden (see De Jong Fenix).

A spinnenkopmolen was built c1840 on the Bilgaardsdijk at 53°10′55″N 5°47′30″E. It drained a 20 hectares (49 acres) polder. An electric motor was installed in the mid 1930s and the mill was demolished in 1937, the base surviving a few years longer.

A mill of unknown type was built to the south of the Bonkevaart at 53°13′00″N 5°49′05″E sometime after 1850. It was a drainage mill and had been demolished by 1930.

A mill of unknown type stood at 53°12′54″N 5°47′28″E. It was built before 1850. It was a drainage mill and had been demolished by 1928.

A mill of unknown type stood at Snekkerburen, on the east side of the Dokkummer Ee at 53°12′57″N 5°48′25″E. The mill was built before 1718. It was a drainage mill and had been demolished by 1832.

A mill of unknown type stood at Snekkerburen, on the west side of the Dokkummer Ee, 53°12′58″N 5°48′19″E. The mill was built before 1718. It was a drainage mill and had been demolished by 1832.

A standerdmolen stood on the Zuidvliet at approximately 53°12′08″N 5°48′29″E. It was a corn mill that was standing in 1542. The mill stood in the grounds of the Sint Anthonie Gasthuis. It was advertised for sale for demolition in 1790 but may have stood until 1798 when a mill on the Vliet was sold to miller F B Schaafsma.

A mill of unknown type was built in 1856. It was a chicory mill. A steam engine was installed in 1869 and the mill was probably demolished shortly after. It was owned by Fabrikaat M A Bokma de Boer.

A mill of unknown type was built in 1842. It was a chicory mill. A steam engine was installed in 1855 and the mill was demolished shortly afterwards. It was owned by W ter Horst.

A mill of unknown type stood on the south side of the Vrouwenpoortsdwinger, 53°12′04″N 5°47′19″E. The mill was built before 1565 and was demolished between 1664 and 1685.

== Sources ==
- Stichting De Fryske Mole (1995). Friese Molens (in Dutch). Leeuwarden: Friese Pers Boekerij bv. ISBN 90-330-1522-6.
