= Jacob de Haan (composer) =

Dutch contemporary composer (born 1959)

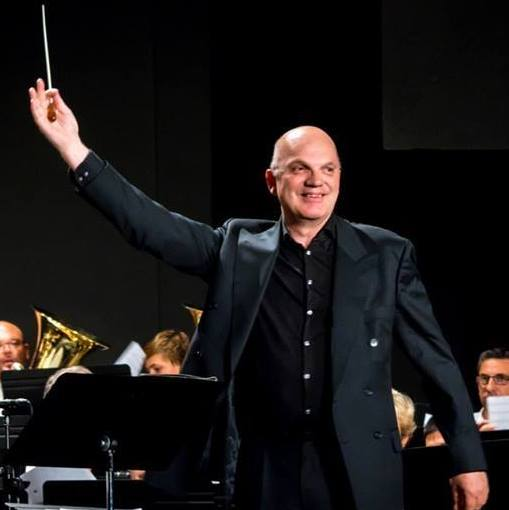
- Born: March 28, 1959 (age 67); Heerenveen, Friesland, Netherlands
- Relatives: Jan de Haan (Brother)
- Awards: Buma Wind Music Award (2018) Buma Classical Award (2018) Omrop Fryslân Award (2003)

Jacob de Haan is a Dutch contemporary composer known for wind music. De Haan has also published various vocal works, including several masses for choir, wind band, and soloists. De Haan is regularly invited as a guest conductor for performances of his own work. He also gives master classes and acts as a jury member at international competitions. De Haan also published works under the pseudonyms Dizzy Stratford, Tony Jabovski, Larry Foster, and Ron Sebregts.

== Early life and education ==
As a child, de Haan learned the basics of piano from his brother Jan de Haan. He later studied at the Leeuwarden Music Academy, majoring in music education and organ studies under the tutelage of Jos van der Kooy. After graduating in 1984, he taught music arrangement at the Leeuwarden Academy.

== Career ==
De Haan gained recognition in the 1980s for his film-inspired compositions. He also conducts master classes and serves as a jury member at international music competitions. In Germany, De Haan collaborated with the Bayerische Musikakademie (Bavarian Music Academy) and the Bundesakademie für musikalische Jugendbildung (Federal Academy for Musical Youth Education) in Trossingen.

== Compositions ==
De Haan draws inspiration from both contemporary and classical composers. His compositional process often begins with improvisation on his old Steinway piano, developing themes and melodies into completed works.

== Awards ==
In 2018, De Haan was honored with the Buma Wind Music Award and the Buma Classical Award. Earlier, in 2003, he received a lifetime achievement award from the Frisian regional broadcasting company Omrop Fryslân.

== Works ==
=== Works for Choir and Concert Band ===
- 2003 Missa Brevis – mixed choir with organ or wind band / fanfare orchestra or brass band, or string orchestra or variable ensemble
- 2006 Missa Katharina – soprano solo, mixed choir with organ or wind band / fanfare orchestra or brass band, or string orchestra or variable ensemble
- 2007 Cantica de Sancto Benedicto – cantata for mixed choir, soprano solo, wind orchestra (and organ ad lib.)
- 2009 The Web – for mixed choir, soprano solo, speaking voice and wind orchestra (movement III of his 1st symphony “The Book of Urizen” on texts by William Blake)
- 2016 The Gospel Mass – mixed (gospel) choir with combo and wind / fanfare orchestra
- 2016 Missa Santa Cecilia – mixed choir with organ or wind orchestra
- 2018 Markus-Passion – optionally with choir, for mezzo-soprano, baritone, speaking voice and wind orchestra

=== Symphonies ===
- 2004 Symphony No. 1: The Book of Urizen for soprano solo, speaker and wind orchestra
  - The Vision
  - The Creation
  - The Web (with added mixed choir)
- 2019 Symphony No. 2: Salamander Symphony for wind orchestra
  - City Express
  - Heim(weh)
  - Pillars of Enterprise

=== Works for Singers and Wind Band ===
- 2008 Stufen on a poem by Hermann Hesse for mezzo-soprano and symphony orchestra or wind orchestra
- 2008 Achterbergliederen on poems by Gerrit Achterberg for solo voice and wind orchestra
- 2011 Nerval's Poems (Trois Odelettes) on poems by Gérard de Nerval for soprano and wind / fanfare orchestra
- 2012 Besinnung on a poem by Hermann Hesse for mezzo-soprano and symphony orchestra or wind orchestra
- 2014 Augen in der Großstadt on a poem by Kurt Tucholsky for solo voice and concert band
- 2018 Markus-Passion for mezzo-soprano, baritone, speaking voice and wind orchestra

=== Works for Concert Band, Fanfare and/or Brass Band ===
- 1983 East-Anglia
- 1984 Crazy Music in the Air
- 1987 Eventide (Song of Liberation)
- 1986 Grounds
- 1986 German Lovesongs (Dreaming)
- 1986 Fresena (March)
- 1986 Fox from the North
- 1986 Suite Symétrique
- 1987 Free World Fantasy
- 1987 Song of Praise
- 1988 Caribbean Variations on a Tune
- 1988 Cornfield Rock
- 1988 Discoduction
- 1989 Oregon (Fantasy for band)
- 1989 Queens Park Melody
- 1990 La Storia
- 1990 Hanseatic Suite
- 1991 Martini (March)
- 1992 Pastorale Symphonique
- 1992 Variazioni in Blue
- 1993 The Universal Band Collection
- 1993 Majestic Prelude
- 1994 Utopia
- 1995 Concerto d'Amore
- 1995 Diogenes
- 1995 Westfort Overture
- 1996 Symphonic Variations
- 1997 Ross Roy
- 1997 Choral Music
- 1997 Contrasto Grosso
- 1998 Adagietto
- 1998 Yellow Mountains
- 1999 Pacific Dreams
- 2000 Festa Paesana
- 2001 Ammerland
- 2001 Pasadena
- 2001 Virginia
- 2002 Dakota – Indian sketches
- 2003 The Saint and the City
- 2003 The Blues Factory
- 2004 Bridge Between Nations
- 2004 Everest (March)
- 2004 Singapore Rhapsody
- 2004 Remembrance Day
- 2005 Nordic Fanfare and Hymn[2]
- 2006 Kraftwerk
- 2006 The Musical Village
- 2006 Pioneers of the Lowlands (March)
- 2007 Nerval's Poems (Trois Odelettes) – with an optional vocal solo part
- 2007 The Heart of Lithuania
- 2008 Legend of a Mountain
- 2008 Border Zone (Sketches from Dinsper)
- 2008 The Fields
- 2009 Jubilate!
- 2009 Arkansas
- 2009 Bliss
- 2009 Monterosi
- 2009 Memorial Suite in C Minor (A Centenary Tribute to Holst's First Suite in E-Flat)
- 2010 Mirage "March"
- 2010 Elegy I (Jealousy)
- 2010 Nostalgia for oboe solo and wind orchestra
- 2010 Viterbo (March)
- 2010 Lentini's Ballad
- 2010 Dances & Sonnets – with recitation of sonnets
- 2010 Ministry of Winds
- 2011 Fanfare for Korea
- 2011 Loraine
- 2011 In Memoriam
- 2011 Golden Pass
- 2012 Queen of the Dolomites
- 2012 Sa Música
- 2012 Laguna di Grado
- 2012 Goddess of Jeju Island
- 2013 Odilia
- 2013 Call of the Valley
- 2013 Campus Intrada
- 2013 Elburg Fantasy
- 2015 Caldas da Rainha
- 2015 Images of Bellac
- 2015 River City
- 2016 The Duke of Albany (Commissioned in 2015 by the Harmonie-Fanfare de Vic-le-Comte, France)
- 2016 The White Stone
- 2016 Manzara
- 2016 Pisa
- 2017 Along the Weser
- 2017 Castrum Alemorum
- 2017 Town of the Seven Hills
- 2018 Sbandiamo!
- 2018 Filadelfia
- 2018 Sea of Hope
- 2018 The Fellowship
- 2019 Agosto (for concert band and euphonium solo, in collaboration with Angela Ciampani)
- 2019 Pilgrims of Wolfryt
- 2019 Proud (with optional bagpipes and drum)
- 2020 Hymn of Cittaslow
- 2020 Rosa Gallica
- 2021 La Antigua
- 2021 To a Friend
- 2022 Cardigan Bay
- 2022 Centennial Celebration
- 2022 Music Xperience
- 2023 Go with the Flow
- 2023 Secrets of the Savoy
- 2023 Vosgian Pictures
- 2024 Kingdom of Navarre
- 2024 The Last Typewriter
- 2025 The River knows your Name
- 2025 Return to Muse
- 2025 Hymnus Animae (hymn of the soul)
- 2026 Happy Harmony (Commissioned in 2024 by harmony Le Réveil Social des travailleurs from Sanvignes-les-Mines, France)
- 2026 Beauty of Nature

=== Works for Fanfare Orchestra Only ===
- 2004 Adornia
- 2010 ’t Ministerie van Fanfare
- 2012 Roll of Honour
- 2013 Elburg Fantasy
- 2017 Pride of the Forest
- 2018 New Hampshire
- 2019 Hora Est!

=== Works for Brass Band Only ===
- 1988 Cat named Bumpers
- 2007 Go for Brass! (a young person’s guide to the brass band)

=== Works for Accordion Ensemble ===
- 1987 Free World Fantasy
- 1989 Oregon
- 1989 Queens Parc Melody
- 1990 La Storia
- 1990 Air & Tune
- 1992 Variazioni in Blue
- 1994 Ballad and Dance
- 1994 Vegeline Suite
- 1995 Concerto d'Amore
- 1997 Contrasto Grosso
- 1998 Friends Forever
- 1998 Pavane
- 1998 The Carolina Dance
- 1998 Adagietto
- 1998 Yellow Mountains
- 2001 Pasadena
- 2002 Dakota
- 2003 The Blues Factory
- 2005 Rossini remix (remix of works by Italian composer Gioachino Rossini)
- 2017 Town of the Seven Hills

=== Works for Youth Orchestra ===
- 2000 First Class 'In Concert' & 'On tour'
- 2002 Band Time Expert
- 2003 Who Did It
- 2004 Postcard from Greece
- 2004 The Seminar Hymn
- 2004 Ottoman Dances
- 2005 Klezmania
- 2005 A Rossini Mix
- 2005 School's Cool
- 2005 Yin Yang Serenade
- 2011 Blue March and Boogie
- 2011 A Day at the Farm
- 2012 Hey Hey Hey!
- 2014 Pump it Up
- 2018 The Beasty Band
