= Annemieke =

Dutch feminine given name

Annemieke (Dutch pronunciation: [ˌɑnəˈmikə]) or Annemiek (Dutch pronunciation: [ˌɑnəˈmik]) is a Dutch feminine given name. Like Annemarie, it is a combination of the names Anna and Maria, via the hypocorism Mieke.

== People with the name ==
People with the names include:

=== Annemiek ===
- Annemiek Bekkering (born 1991), Dutch competitive sailor
- Annemiek Derckx (born 1954), Dutch sprint canoer
- Annemiek de Haan (born 1981), Dutch rower
- Annemiek Padt-Jansen (1921–2007), Dutch harpist and politician
- Annemiek van Vleuten (born 1982), Dutch road cyclist

=== Annemieke ===
- Annemieke Bes (born 1978), Dutch competitive sailor
- Annemieke Fokke (born 1967), Dutch field hockey player
- Annemieke Kiesel (born 1979), Dutch footballer
- Annemieke Mein (born 1978), Dutch-born Australian textile artist
- Annemieke Ruigrok (born 1959), Dutch ambassador to Australia, Hong Kong, etc.
- Annemieke Schollaardt (born 1979), Dutch DJ and radio personality

== See also ==
- 286841 Annemieke, a minor planet
- Annemie, a Dutch windmill
