= Nuenen en Gerwen =

Coordinates: 51°28′49″N 5°33′28″E

Nuenen en Gerwen was a municipality in the Dutch province of North Brabant. It covered the villages of Nuenen and Gerwen.

The municipality existed until 1821, when the village of Nederwetten (until then part of Nederwetten en Eckart) was added to form the new municipality of Nuenen, Gerwen en Nederwetten.
