= De Roosdonck, Nuenen =

Windmill in the Netherlands

De Roosdonck
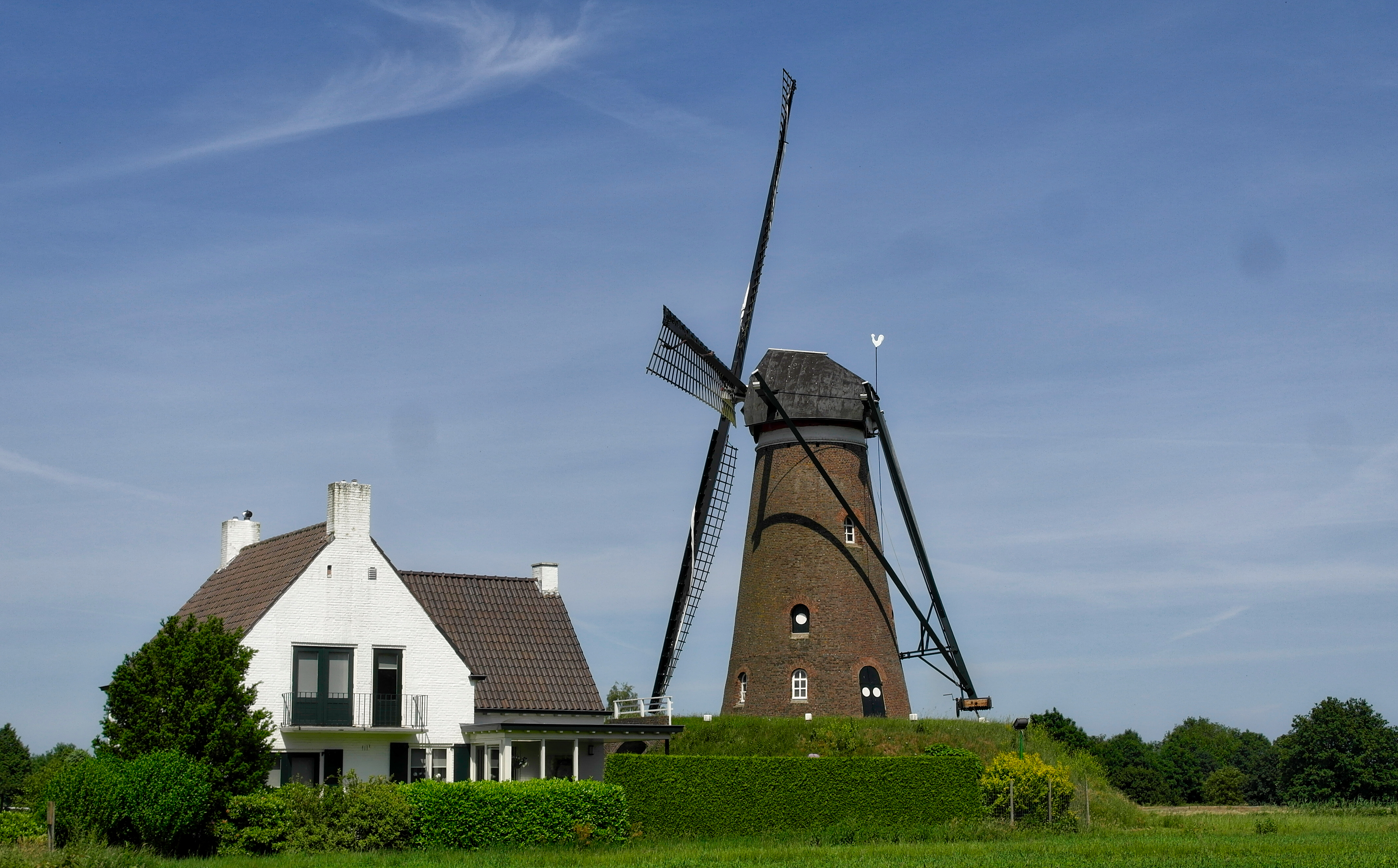
- De Roosdonck in 2016
- Alternative names: Molen van Merks; Nuenense Molen

General information
- Status: Rijksmonument (30823)
- Type: Windmill
- Address: Gerwenseweg 2; 5674 SG, Nuenen
- Town or city: Nuenen
- Country: Netherlands
- Coordinates: 51.481983°N 5.5503321°E
- Completed: 1884
- Designations: Gristmill, previously also oil mill

References
- Website of the mill Facebook page Dutch Windmill Database; De Hollandsche Molen

De Roosdonck is a windmill located at the Gerwenseweg 2 in Nuenen, in the province of North Brabant, Netherlands. Built in 1884, the windmill was initially planned to be built as a smock mill. After the structure collapsed soon after completion, the mill was rebuilt to the current "beltmolen" type, with a pile of sand put around the mill allowing it to be built higher. Vincent van Gogh, who lived in Nuenen from 1883 to 1885, painted and drew De Roosdonck a total of 7 times. The most famous painting in his Nuenen period, The Potato Eaters, was painted in the neighbouring cottage.

The windmill was built by Antonius van Himbergen from nearby Bladel, who has also built the Annemie windmill in Acht, and other similar type windmills in the area. From 1887 to 1930 the windmill was also used as an oil mill, with the machinery bought from the miller of Sint Victor in Heeze.

Due to industrialisation and the introduction of other sources of energy, professional production of flour stopped in 1959. The mill deteriorated. After purchase by the local government in 1970, the windmill was restored in 1972, with further restorations in 1984 and 1996. Since 1995, the windmill has been in private hands once again, with the son of the last professional miller as its owner. Also since that year the windmill has been open for visitors, selling a wide range of organic flour products.

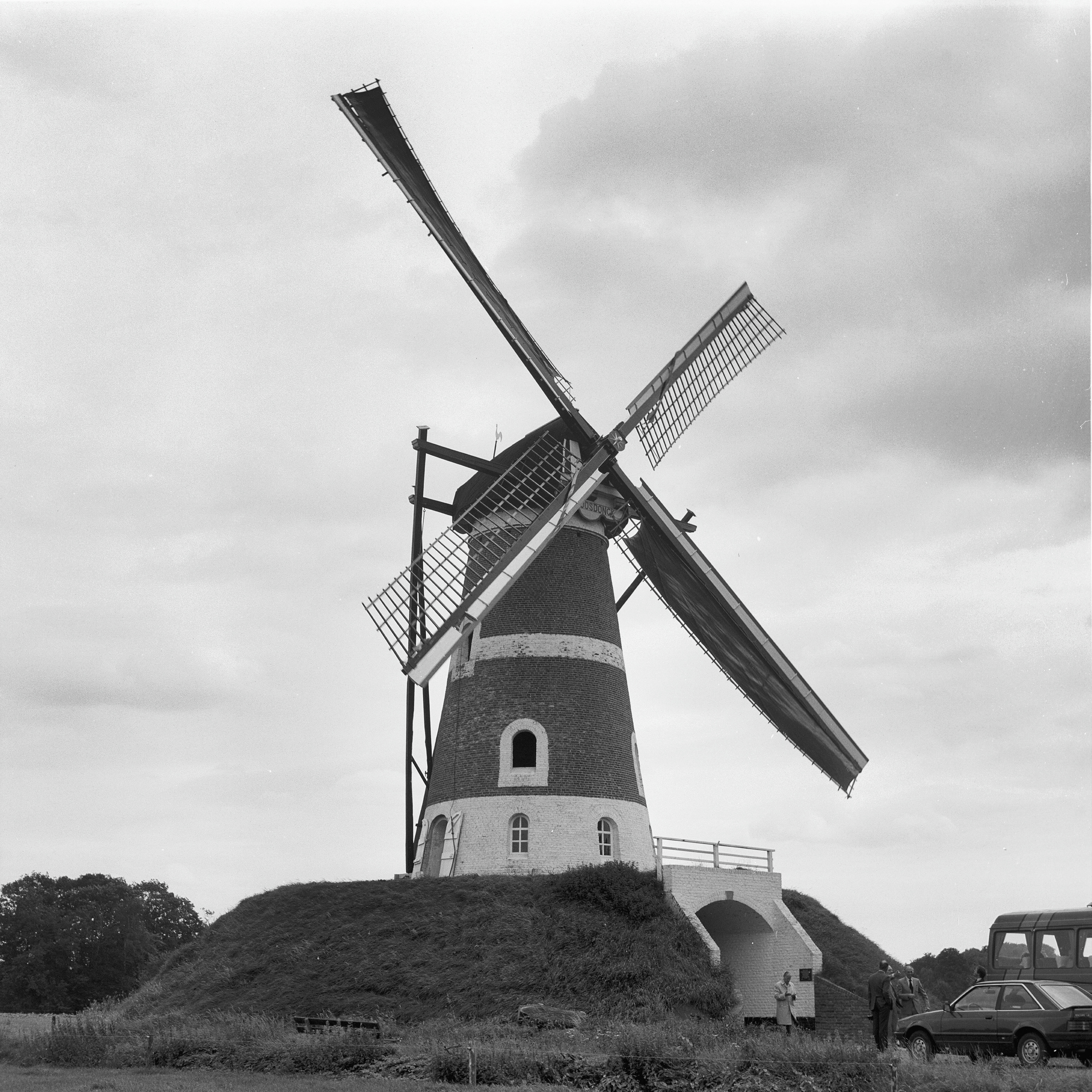
The mill in 1985

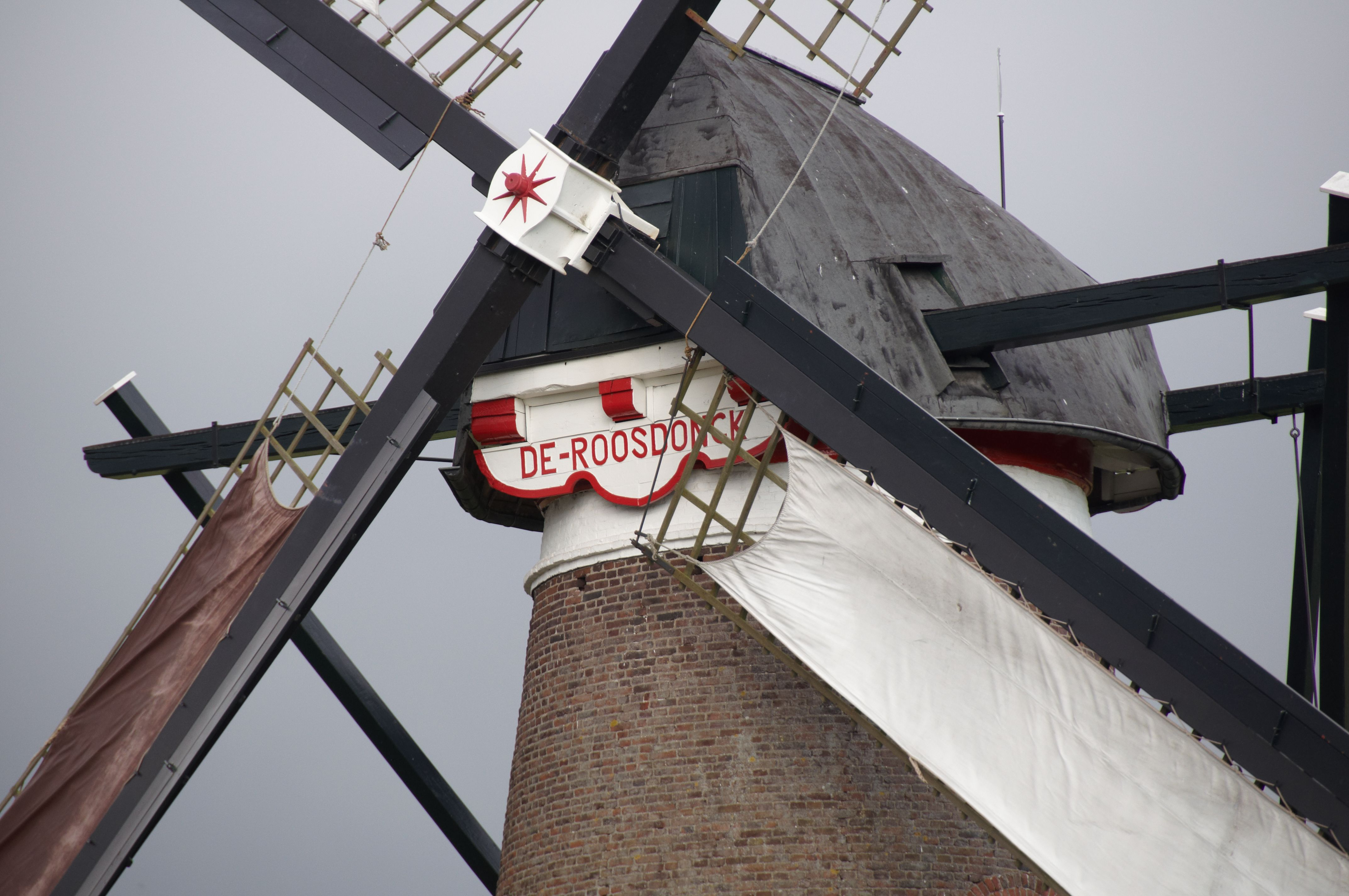
Detail of the beard, depicting "DE-ROOSDONCK"

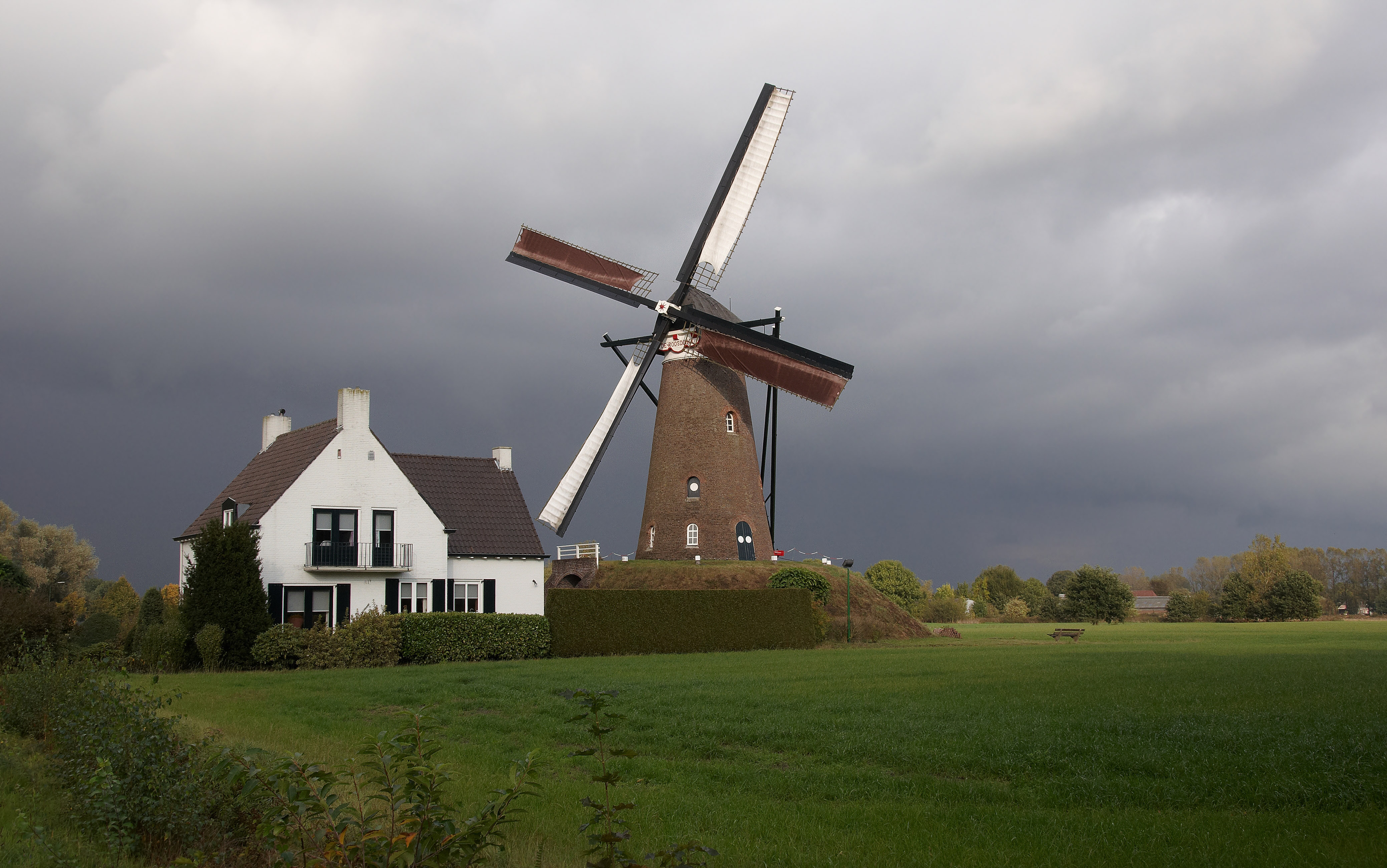
The windmill in stormy weather

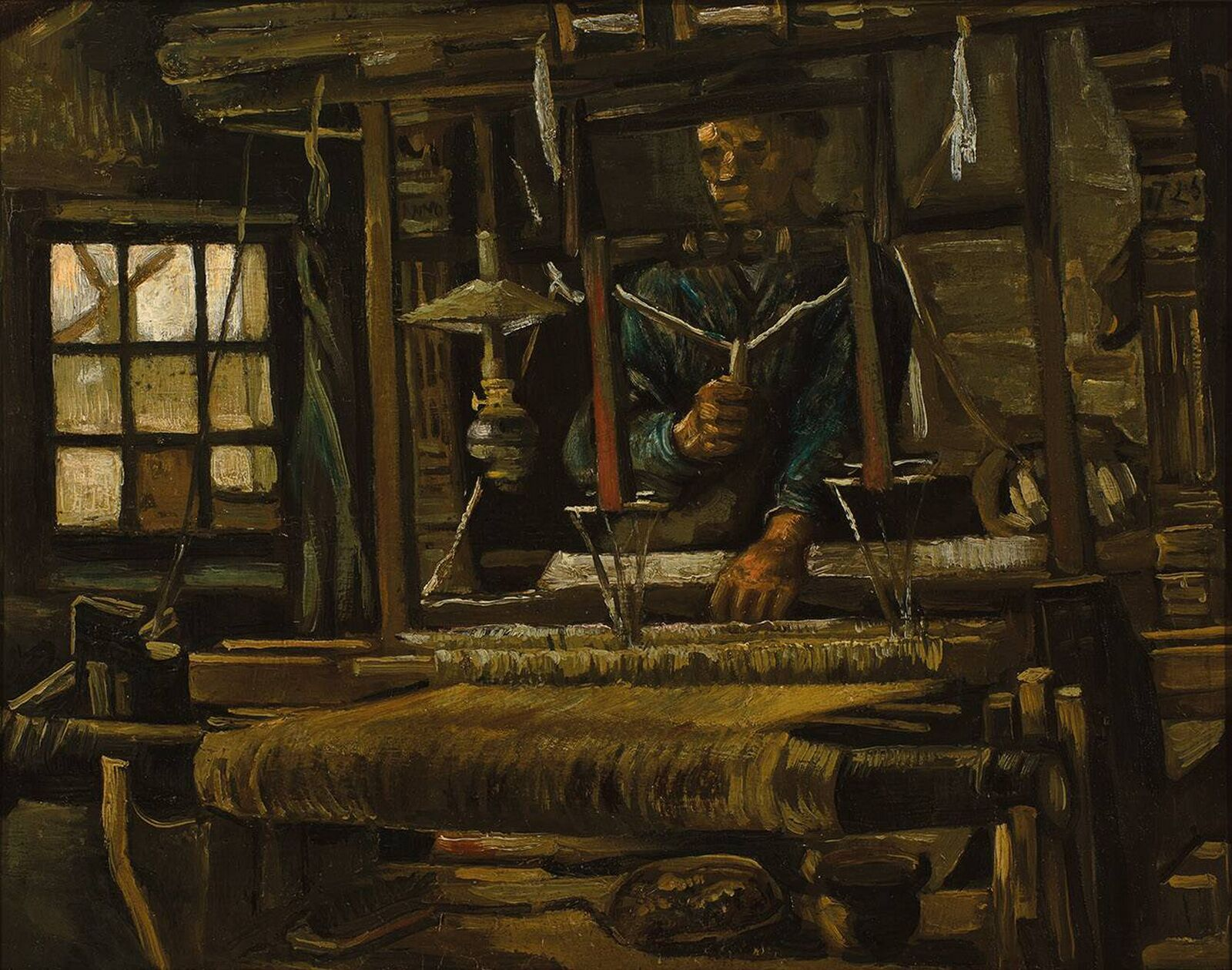
Van Gogh's 1884 painting "Weaver, Seen from the Front", with the mill visible through the window
