= Annemie =

Windmill in the Netherlands

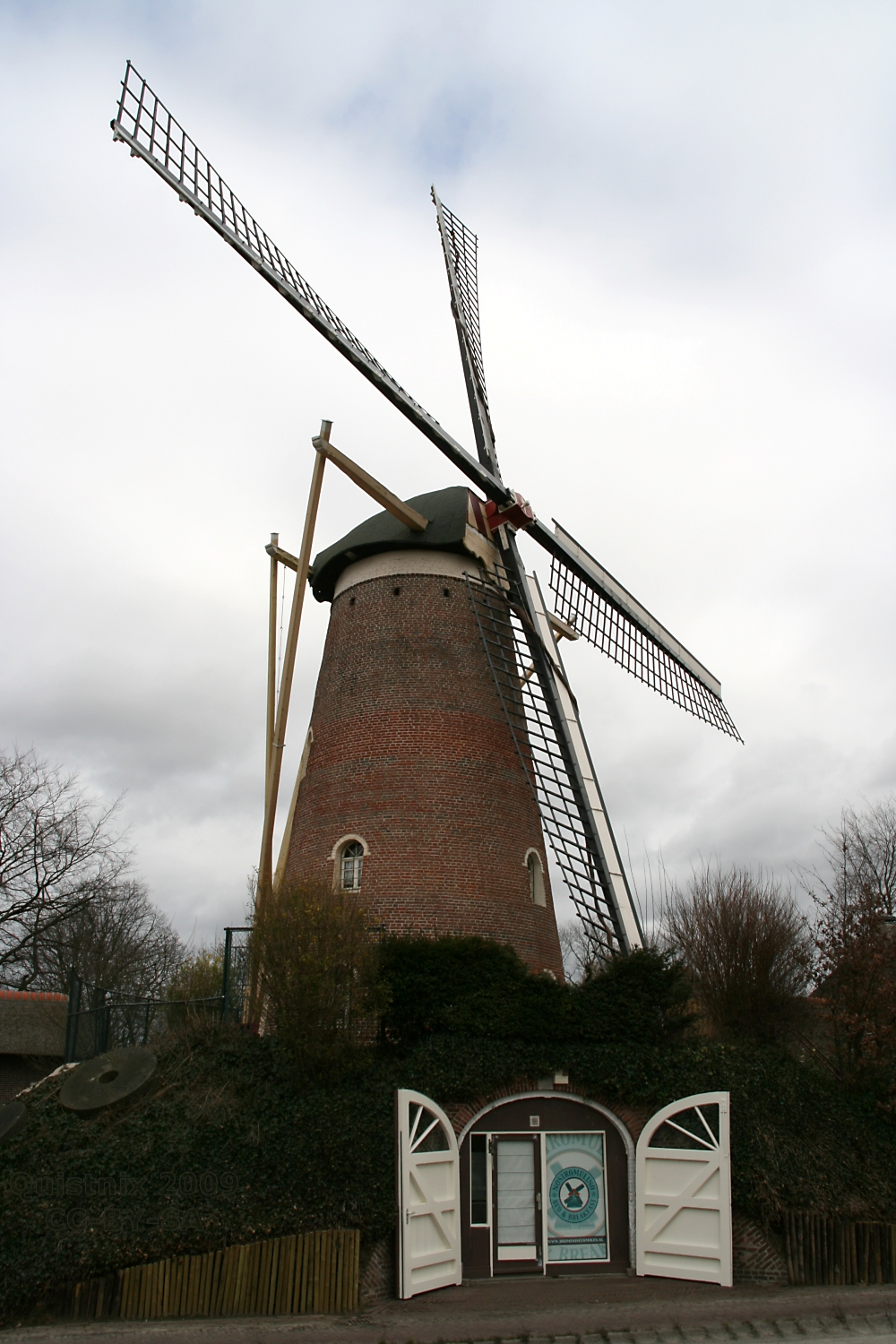
- Annemie in 2009

General information
- Status: Rijksmonument (14637)
- Type: Windmill
- Address: Boschdijk 1006; 5627 AE, Eindhoven
- Town or city: Eindhoven
- Country: Netherlands
- Coordinates: 51.480994°N 5.435775°E
- Completed: 1891
- Designations: Gristmill, currently Bed and breakfast

References
- Database of Mills; De Hollandsche Molen

The Annemie is a windmill located on the Boschdijk 1006 in Eindhoven, in the province of North Brabant, Netherlands. Built in 1891 on an artificial hill, the windmill functioned as a gristmill. The mill was built as a tower mill and its sails have a span of 25 meters (82 ft). The mill is a national monument (nr 14637) since 15 August 1972.

== History ==
The Annemie was built in 1891 by Antonius van Himbergen from Bladel, who also built De Roosdonck in Nuenen, which also used to function as a gristmill. In 1957, the mill was refurnished as a house, and the inner workings were removed, though main parts like the central axis and wheel were kept. In 1991, the mill was restored, and after consecutive maintenance works between 2005 and 2019, the mill is presently in reasonable condition. The Annemie is privately owned and used as living accommodations as well as an office, so visits are not possible.

== Gallery ==
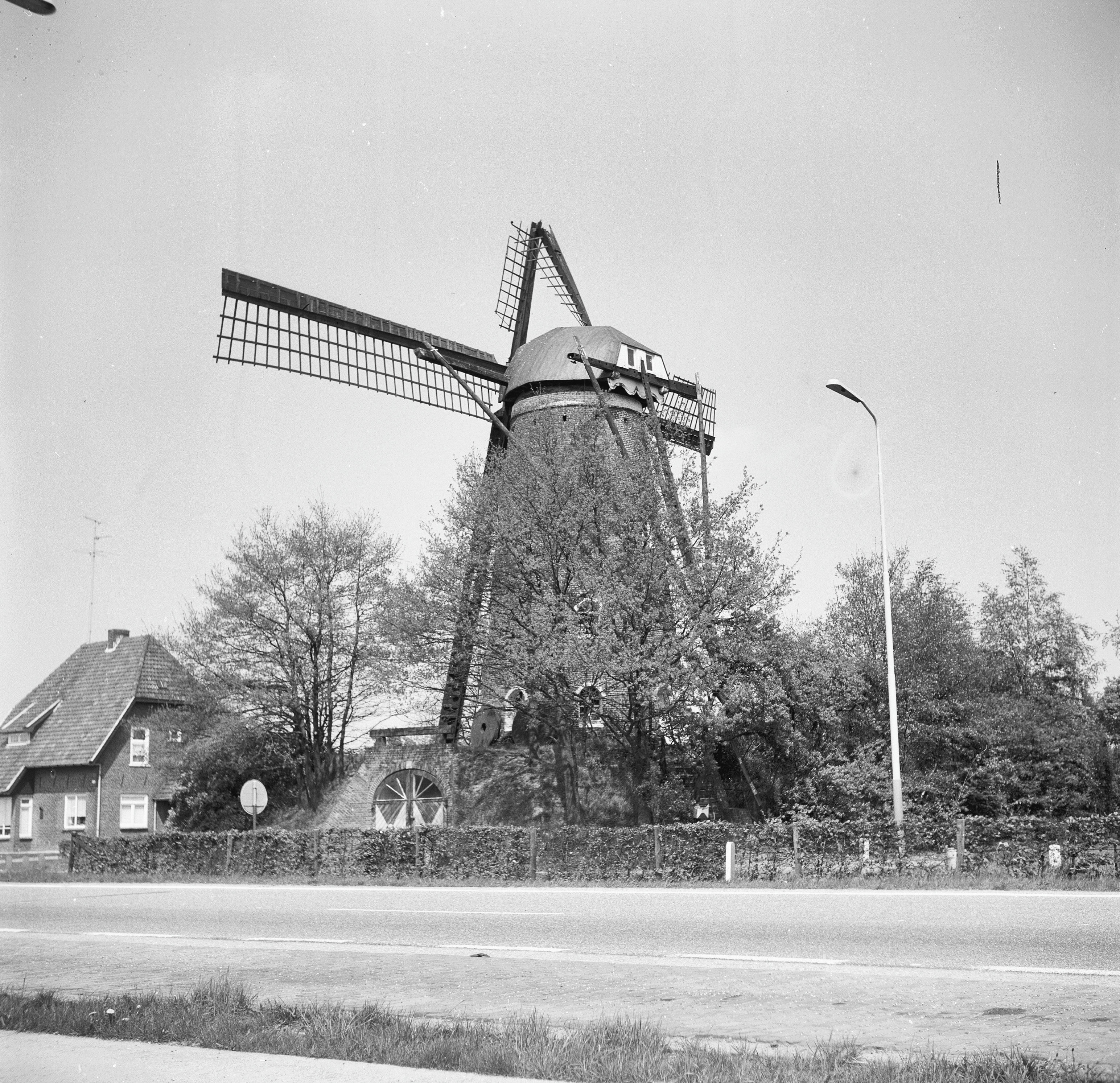
The mill with a broken sail

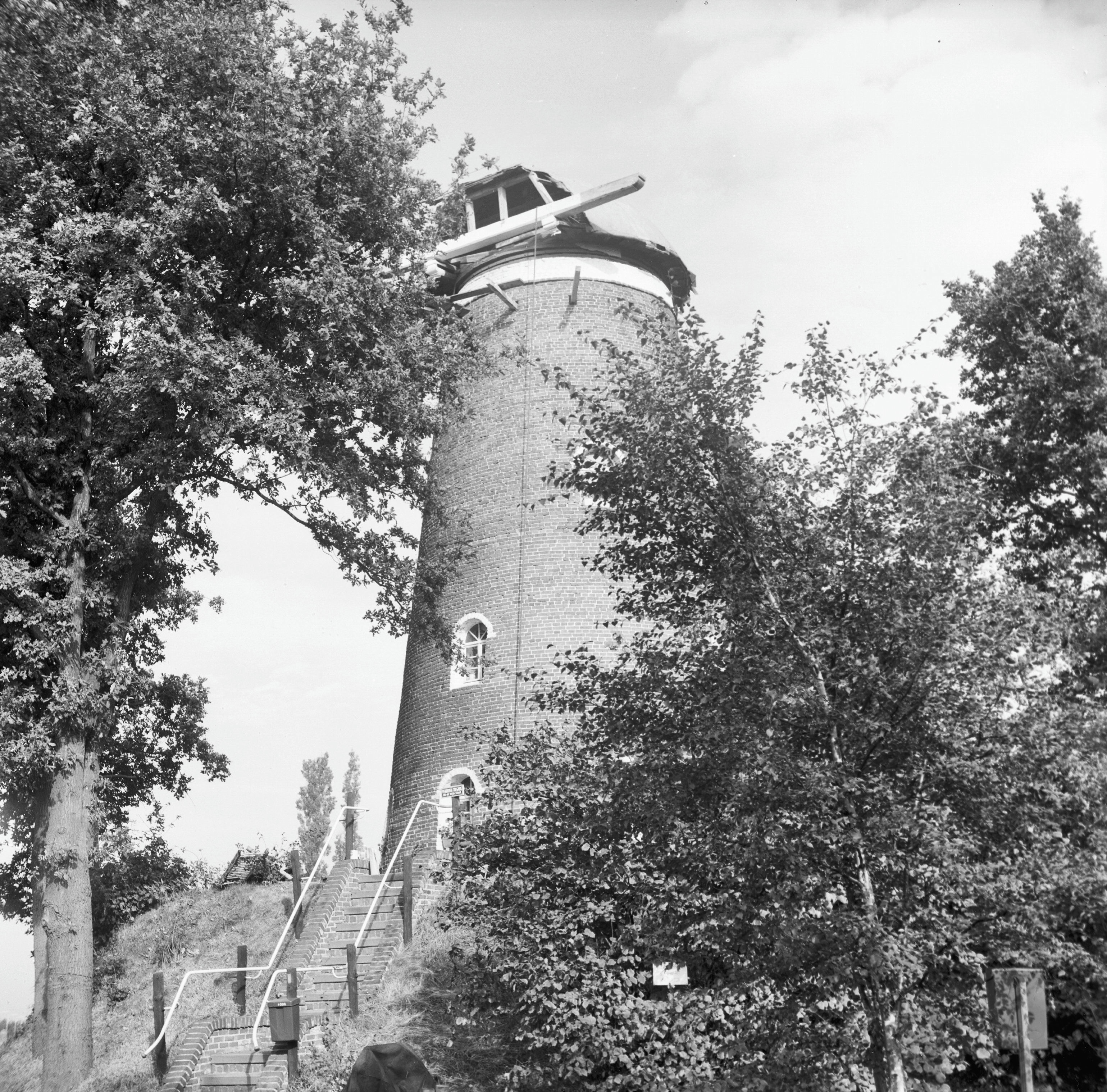
The mill being restored

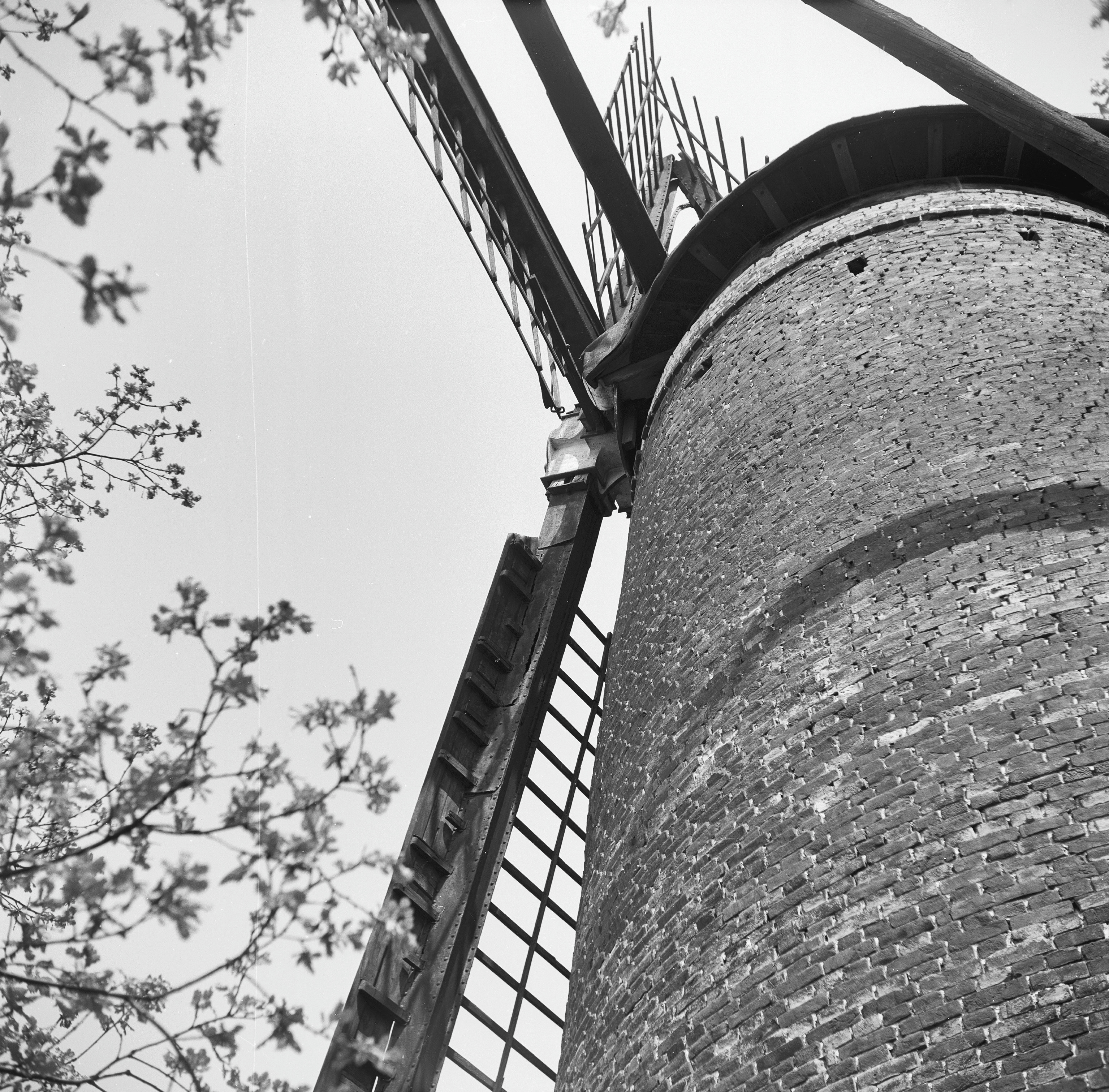
Close-up of the top half of the mill

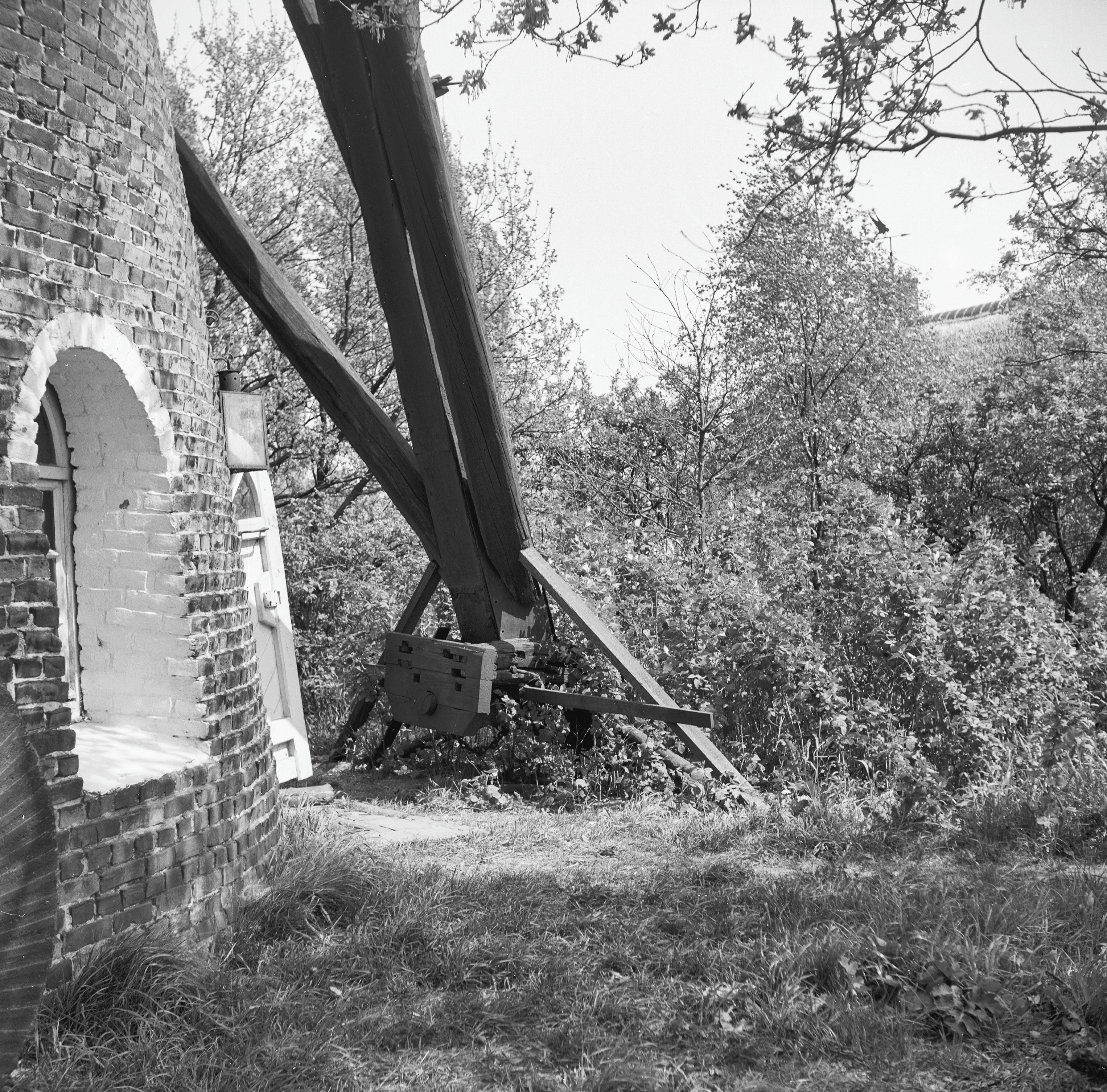
Detail of the "kruilier", used to turn the mill towards the wind

== See also ==
- Annemieke, a Dutch feminine given name
