= Padt =

Padt is a Germanic surname. Notable people with this surname include:

- Sergio Padt (born 1990), Dutch footballer
- Guido De Padt (born 1954), Belgian politician

== See also ==
- Annemiek Padt-Jansen (1921–2007), Dutch harpist and politician
