= Mieke (given name) =

Dutch feminine given name

Mieke is a feminine given name and nickname of Dutch origin. Notable people with the given name include:

== Given name ==
- Mieke de Boer (born 1980), Dutch darts player
- Mieke Eerkens, Dutch-American writer
- Mieke Offeciers (born 1952), Belgian businesswoman and former Belgian government minister
- Mieke Pullen (1957–2003), Dutch long-distance runner
- Mieke Sterk (born 1946) Dutch track and field athlete and politician
- Mieke Suys (born 1968), Belgian athlete
- Mieke Wijaya (1940–2022), Indonesian actress

== Nickname ==
- Mieke Andela-Baur (1923–2016), Dutch politician
- Mieke Bal (born 1946), Dutch cultural theorist and video artist
- Mieke Buchan, Australian television and radio presenter
- Mieke Cabout (born 1986), Dutch water polo player
- Mieke Jaapies (born 1943), Dutch sprint canoer
- Mieke Vogels (born 1954), Flemish politician

== See also ==
- Maria (given name)
- Mieke (disambiguation)
