= Mieke =

Mieke may refer to:

- Mieke (given name), a list of people with the given name
- Mieke Telkamp, Dutch singer Maria Telgenkamp (1934–2016)
- Mieke (character), a fictional character from comic album series Yoko Tsuno
- Mieke Schmidt, a fictional character in EuroTrip, a 2004 American comedy film
- 1753 Mieke, a main-belt asteroid

== See also ==
- Meike (disambiguation)
