= Nederwetten en Eckart =

Coordinates: 51°29′17″N 5°30′53″E

Nederwetten en Eckart was a municipality in the Dutch province of North Brabant. It included the villages of Nederwetten and Eckart, the latter of which no longer exists; it is now a part of Eindhoven.

The municipality existed until 1821. In that year, Nederwetten became part of the municipality of Nuenen, Gerwen en Nederwetten, and Eckart merged with Woensel.
