= Australia–Netherlands relations =

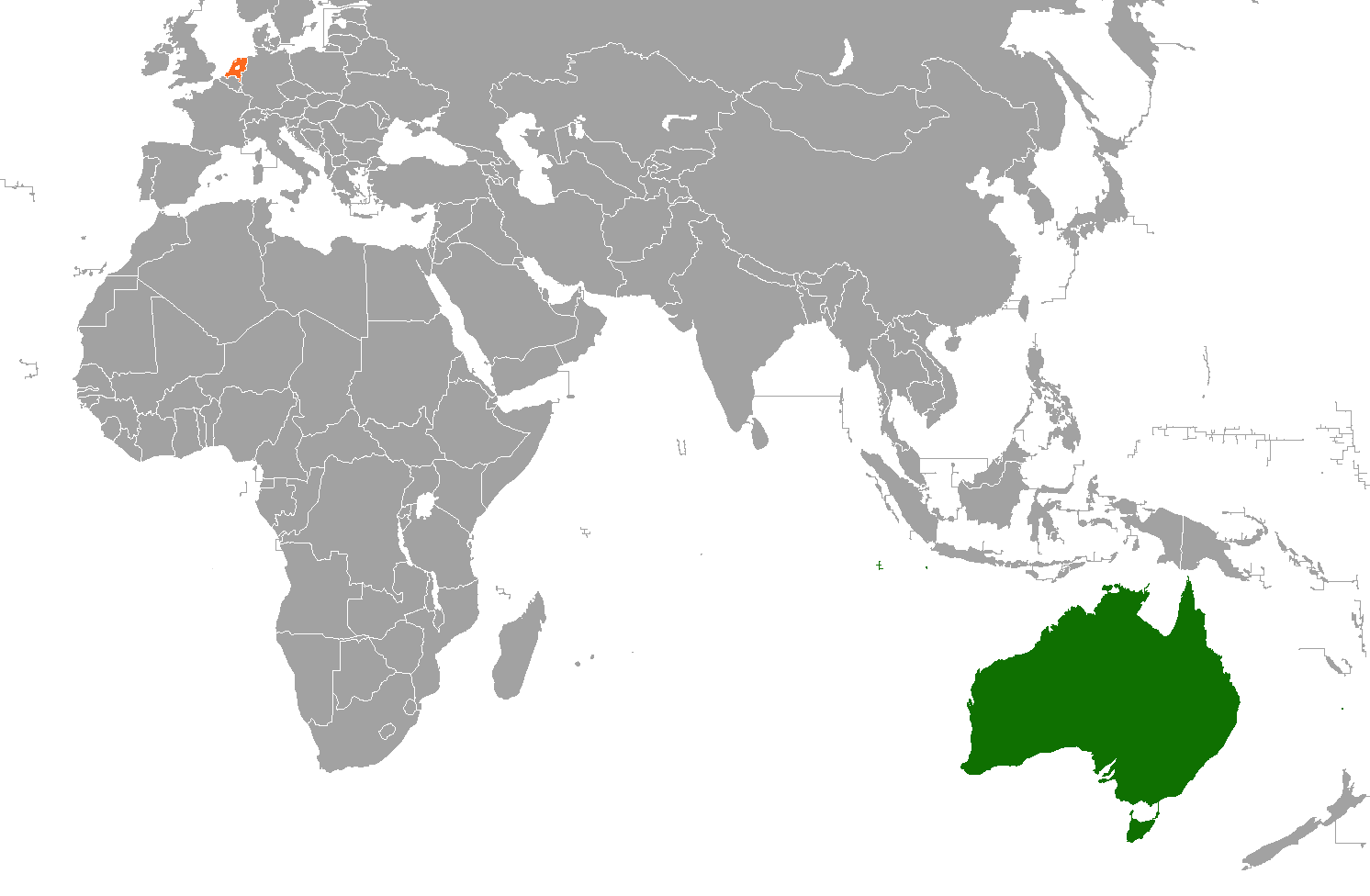

- Australia: Netherlands

Monthly value of Australian merchandise exports to the Netherlands (A$ millions) since 1988

Monthly value of Dutch merchandise exports to Australia (A$ millions) since 1988

Bilateral relations exist between Australia and the Netherlands. Australia has an embassy in The Hague. The Netherlands has an embassy in Canberra. The two countries communicate and cooperate on a range of issues, including counterterrorism, climate change, human rights, and the Millennium Development Goals. In 2001 the countries signed an agreement on social security for those who have lived or worked in both countries.

During the period 1947–1971 about 160,000 Dutch people emigrated to Australia, and as of 2006 there are around 90,000 Australians of Dutch descent.

== History ==
During the period 1606–1770, Dutch seafarers visited Australia numerous times.

The first recorded European sighting of the Australian mainland, and the first recorded European landfall on the Australian continent (in 1606), are attributed to the Dutch. The first ship and crew to chart the Australian coast and meet with Aboriginal people was the Duyfken captained by Dutch navigator, Willem Janszoon. The Dutch charted the whole of the western and northern coastlines and named the island continent "New Holland" during the 17th century, but made no attempt at settlement. Other Dutch explorers include Abel Tasman and Willem de Vlamingh.

During and immediately post the second world war, the Netherlands East Indies government-in-exile, was stationed in Wacol, Queensland, and the Netherlands Indies Government Information Service in Melbourne, with the agreement of the then Labor Australian government. Australia was planned as the staging post for re-imposition of colonial rule in Indonesia. However, Australian maritime unions did much to frustrate this, with bans on manning/loading/coaling from September 1946 to a final ending of all bans in July 1949.

Historically, diplomatic issues have arisen over West New Guinea, and Indonesia's independence from the Netherlands (with Australia recognising the Indonesian Republic on 9 July 1947). In 1955, Prime Minister Robert Menzies visited the Netherlands to discuss the issue of West Papua with Dutch officials including the Prime Minister of the Netherlands Willem Drees and Foreign Minister Joseph Luns.

== Resident diplomatic missions ==
- Australia has an embassy in The Hague.
- The Netherlands has an embassy in Canberra and a consulate-general in Sydney.
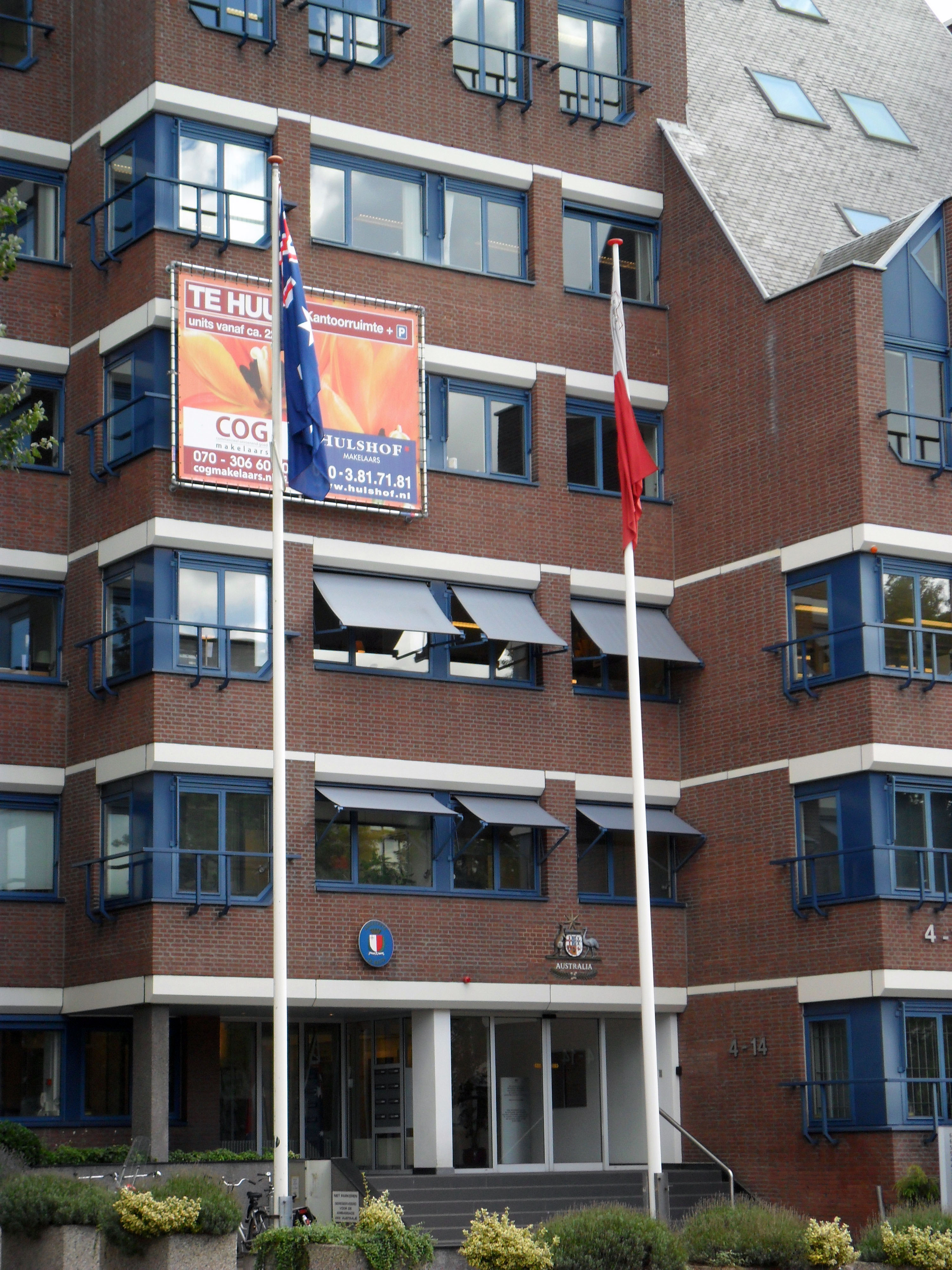
Embassy of Australia in The Hague

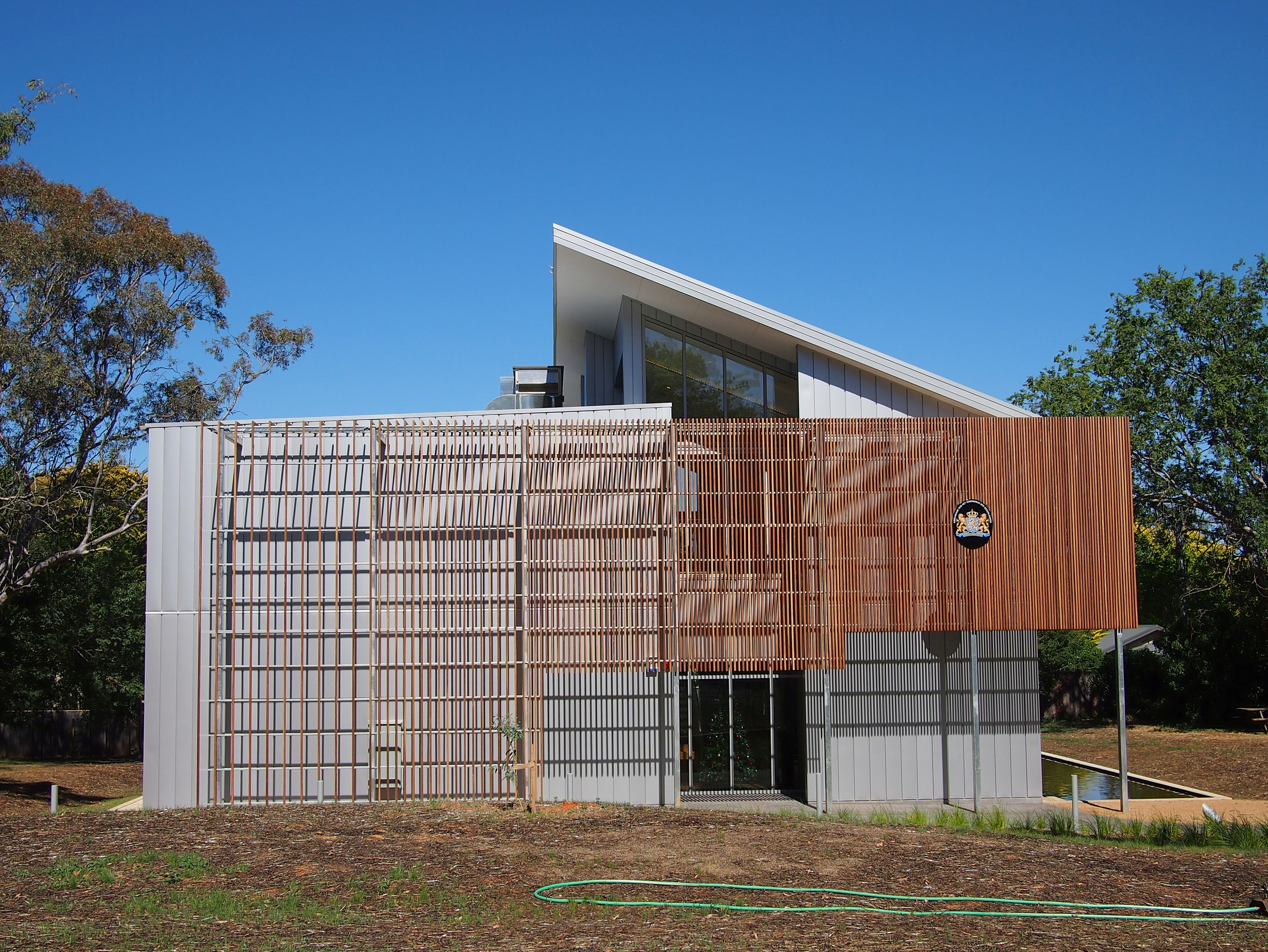
Embassy of the Netherlands in Canberra

== See also ==
- Foreign relations of Australia
- Foreign relations of the Netherlands
- Dutch Australians
- List of ambassadors of Australia to the Netherlands
