= Nuenen, Gerwen en Nederwetten =

- Municipality
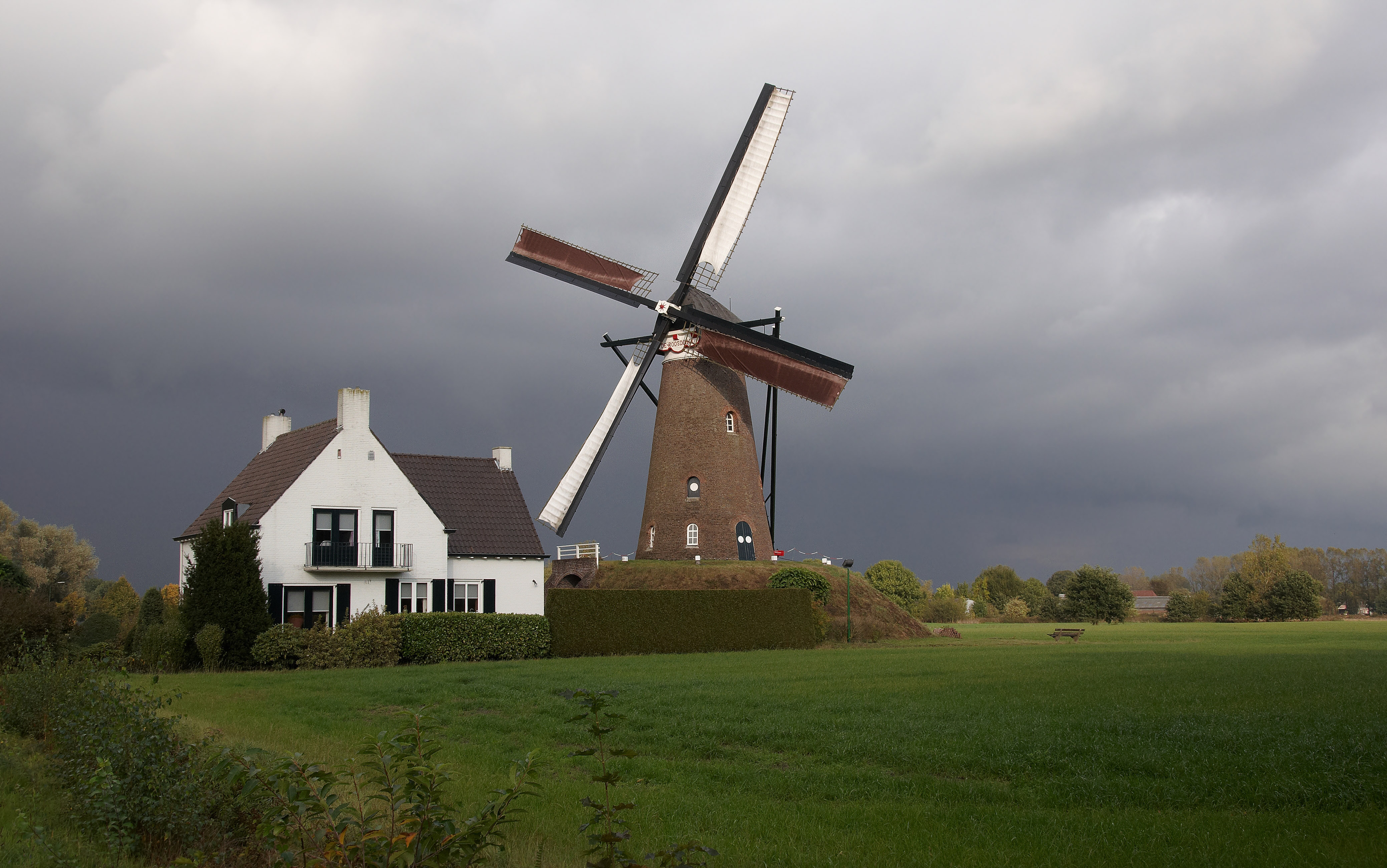
- Windmill De Roosdonck in Nuenen

- Flag Coat of arms

- Location in North Brabant
- Coordinates: 51°29′N 5°33′E
- Country: Netherlands
- Province: North Brabant

Government
  - Body: Municipal council
  - Mayor: Freek van Genugten (CDA)

Area
  - Total: 33.94 km^{2} (13.10 sq mi)
  - Land: 33.71 km^{2} (13.02 sq mi)
  - Water: 0.23 km^{2} (0.089 sq mi)
- Elevation: 16 m (52 ft)

Population (January 2021)
  - Total: 23,702
  - Density: 703/km^{2} (1,820/sq mi)
- Time zone: UTC+1 (CET)
  - Summer (DST): UTC+2 (CEST)
- Postcode: 5670–5674
- Area code: 040
- Website: www.nuenen.nl

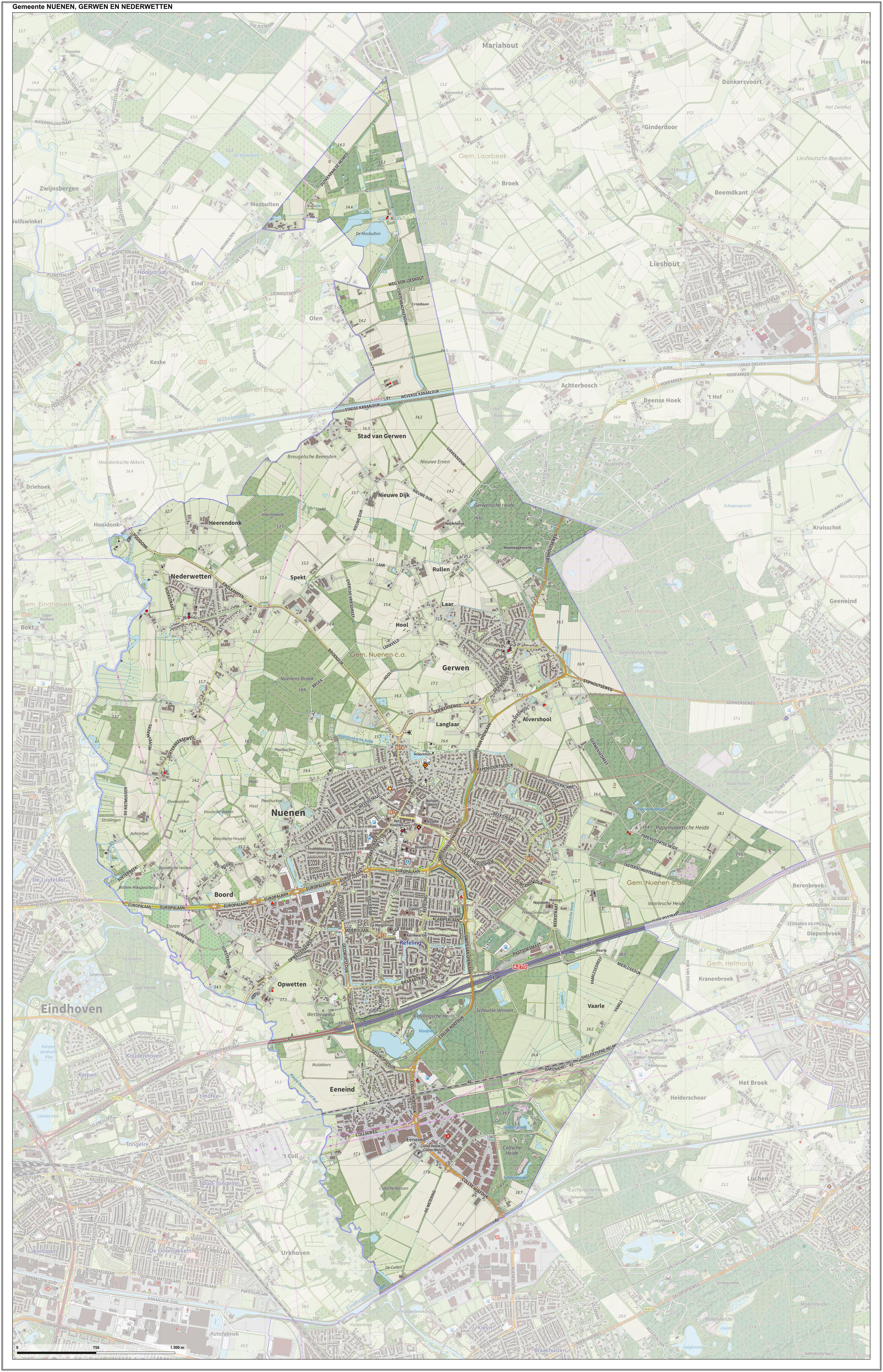
Dutch Topographic map of Nuenen, June 2015

Nuenen, Gerwen en Nederwetten (pronounced [ˈnynə(ŋ) ˈɣɛrʋən ɛ ˌneːdərˈʋɛtə(n)], or [-ʋə ʔɛ -]) is a municipality consisting of the larger village of Nuenen and two adjacent smaller ones. It is located in the province of North Brabant, about 10 kilometres (6.2 mi) east of Eindhoven, the fifth largest city in the Netherlands. From being a small farmers town of less than 1000 inhabitants around 1950 Nuenen grew steadily as ever more new employees of Philips and the Eindhoven University (TUE) chose Nuenen as their new home.

== Population centres ==
- Eeneind
- Gerwen
- Nederwetten
- Nuenen
- Opwetten
- Stad van Gerwen

== History ==
A battle fought in Nuenen during World War II was shown in an episode of the miniseries Band of Brothers. The historical battle took place there during Operation Market-Garden in September 1944.

== Politics ==
=== Municipal government ===
As of the 2026 Dutch municipal elections, the municipal council of Nuenen contains eight parties. After the election, the municipal executive consists of four coalition parties: ONS Nuenen, Gerwen en Nederwetten (ONS NGN), VVD, CDA and Combinatie Nuenen ca.

Party	Seats
ONS Nuenen, Gerwen en Nederwetten	4 / 19
Labour Party/GreenLeft	3 / 19
Democrats 66	3 / 19
People's Party for Freedom and Democracy	2 / 19
W70 Nuenen	2 / 19
Christian Democratic Appeal	2 / 19
Combinatie Nuenen c.a.	2 / 19
De Nuenense Mens	1 / 19

== Notable people ==
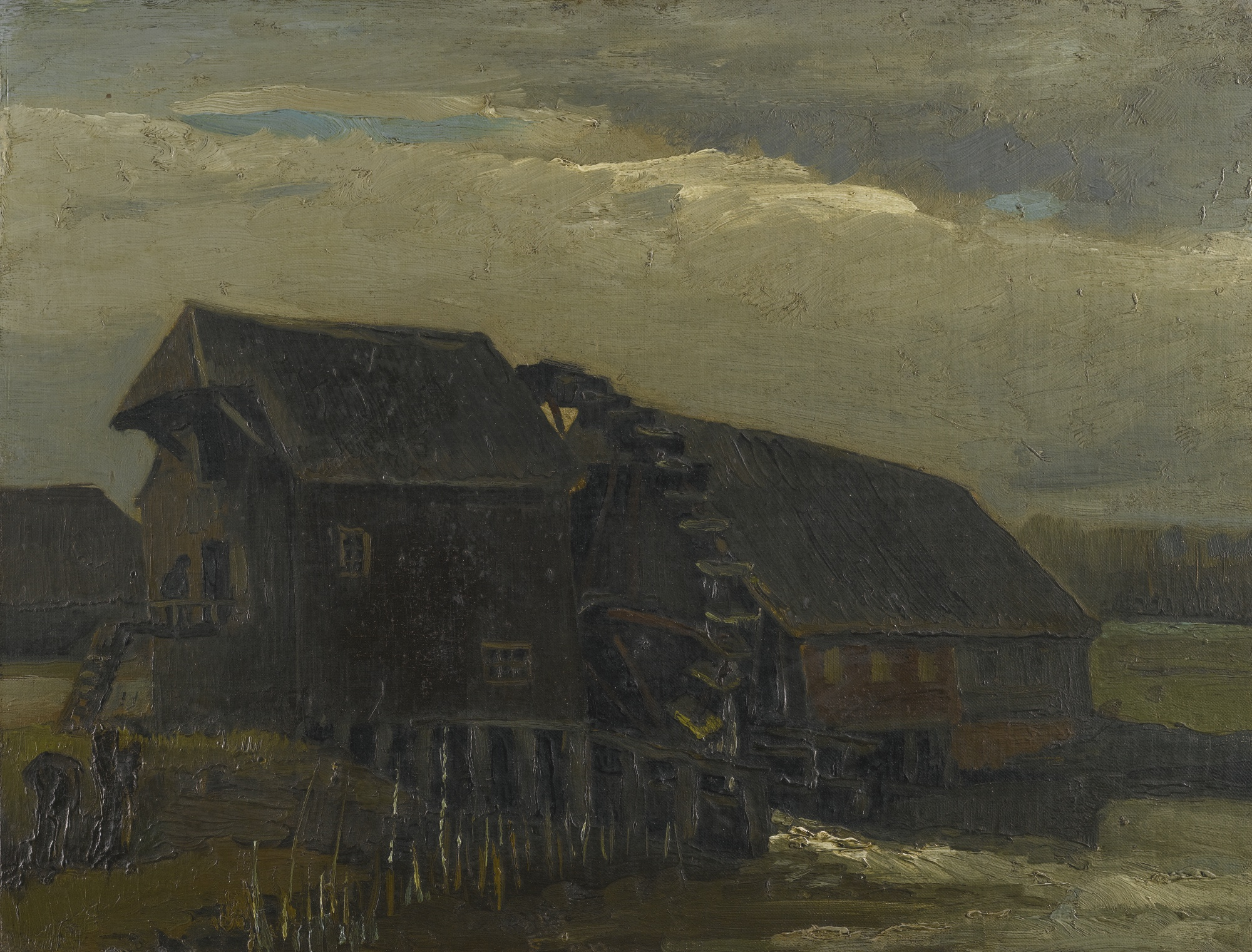
Water Mill at Opwetten, by Vincent van Gogh, 1884 (F48)

=== Vincent van Gogh ===
Vincent van Gogh (1853–1890) spent two years in Nuenen from 1883 to 1885. His father lived and worked there as the Protestant pastor in the largely catholic environment. Van Gogh lived in the small carriagehouse next to the beautiful pastor's house, which is well preserved and visited by art lovers from all over the world. Van Gogh was extremely productive in his years in Nuenen. It is referred to as his so-called dark or sombre period. Here he painted his famous painting The Potato Eaters as well as Congregation Leaving the Reformed Church in Nuenen (Het uitgaan van de hervormde kerk te Nuenen). The latter painting was stolen from the Van Gogh Museum in December 2002.

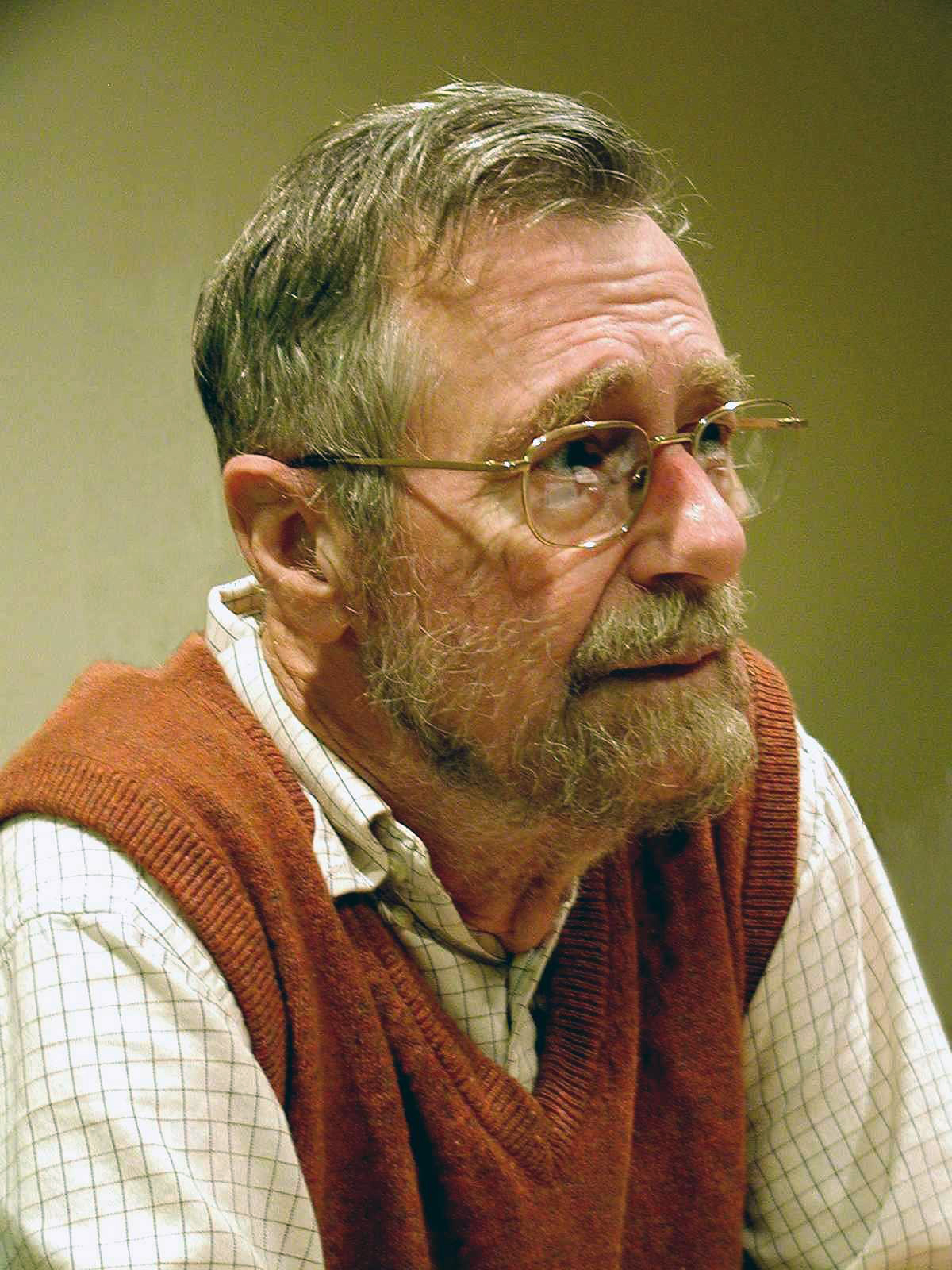
Edsger Wybe Dijkstra

=== Edsger Dijkstra ===
Edsger Dijkstra (1930–2002), Dutch computer scientist, then a professor in the Mathematics Department at the Technical University of Eindhoven, moved to a newly built house in Nuenen in 1964. Nuenen was added to the world map of computer science in 1973 when Dijkstra started to circulate his reports signed ‘Burroughs Research Fellow’ with his home address. Many thought that Burroughs, a company known at that time for the production of computers based on an innovative hardware architecture, was based in Nuenen. In fact, Dijkstra was the only research fellow of Burroughs Corporation and worked for it from home, occasionally travelling to its branches in the USA. Dijkstra moved in 1984 to the University of Austin, Texas, USA, until his retirement in the autumn of 1999. Dijkstra returned from Austin, terminally ill, to his original house in Nuenen in February 2002, where he died half a year later, on 6 August 2002.

=== Other notable people ===
- Django Wagner, Dutch Wiki (born 1970 in Nuenen) a sinti, folk musician
- Ruud Kuijten (born 1973 in Nuenen) a male, right-handed, Belgian badminton player
- Willemijn Verkaik (born 1975) is a Dutch singer and actress, brought up in Nuenen
- Paulus Schäfer (born 1978 in Gerwen) a gypsy jazz guitarist, composer and arranger
- Steven Kruijswijk (born 1987 in Nuenen) a Dutch road bicycle racer

== Gallery ==
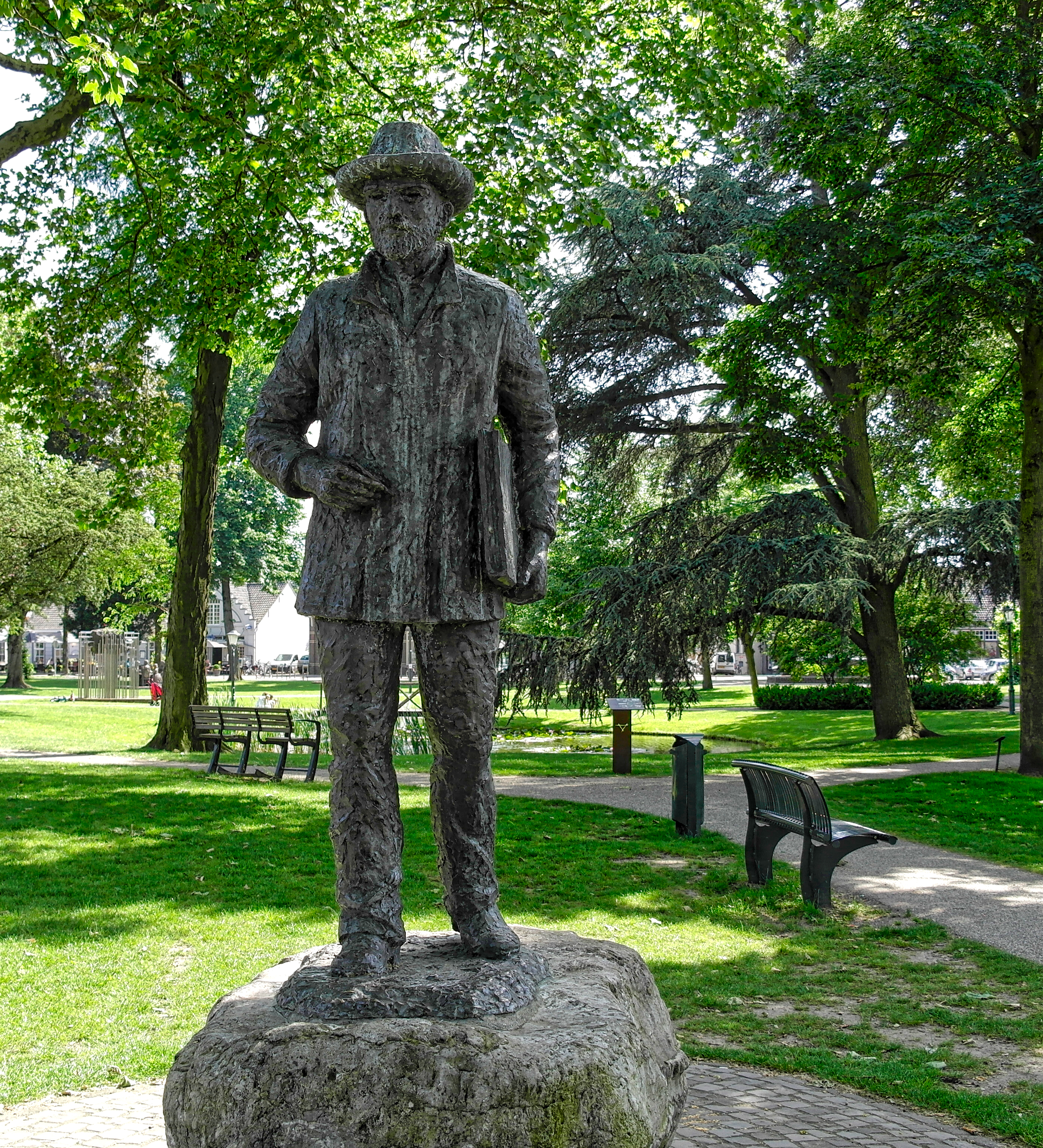
Vincent van Gogh standbeeld in Nuenen

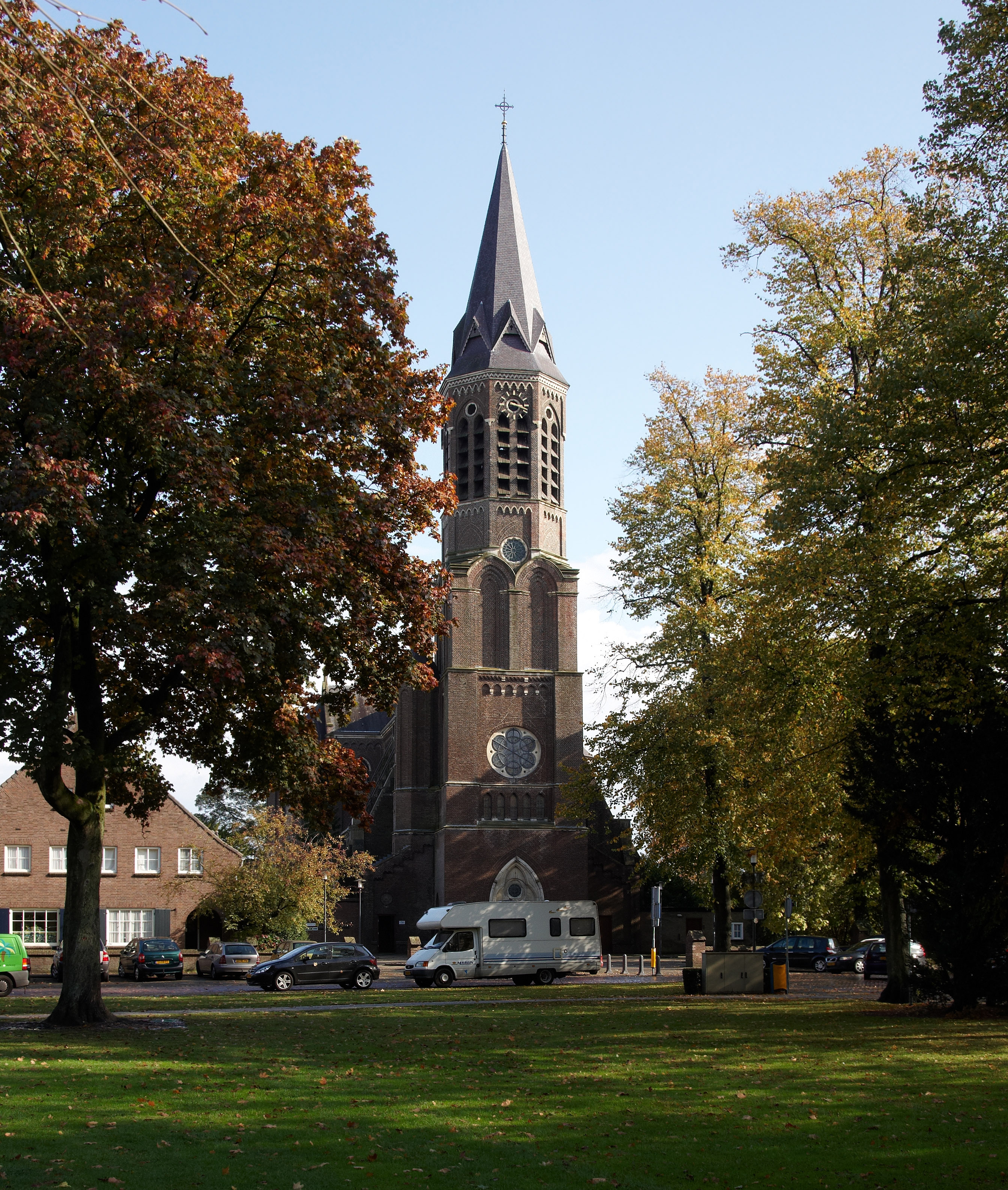
Sint Clemenskerk Nuenen

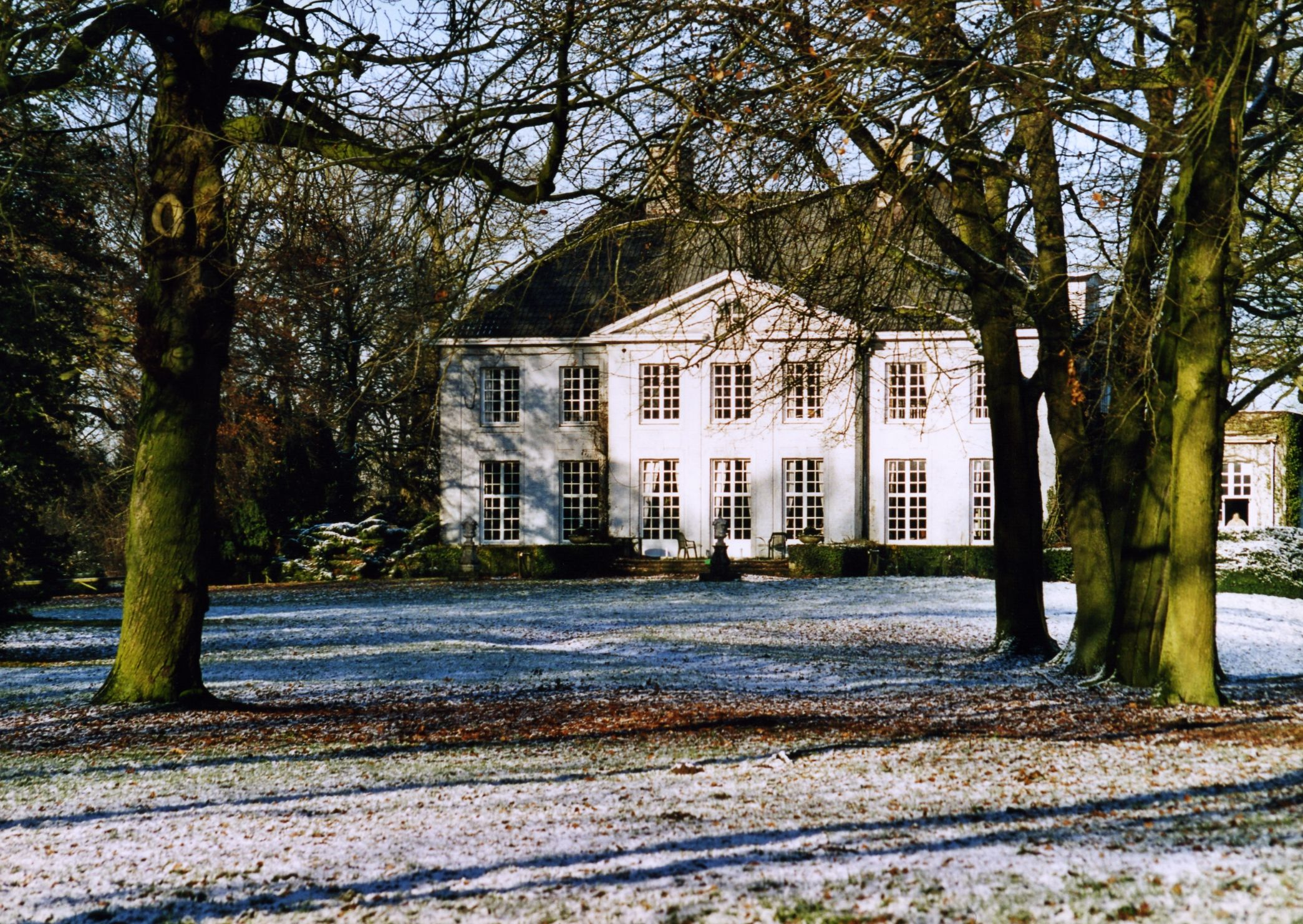
Soeterbeek

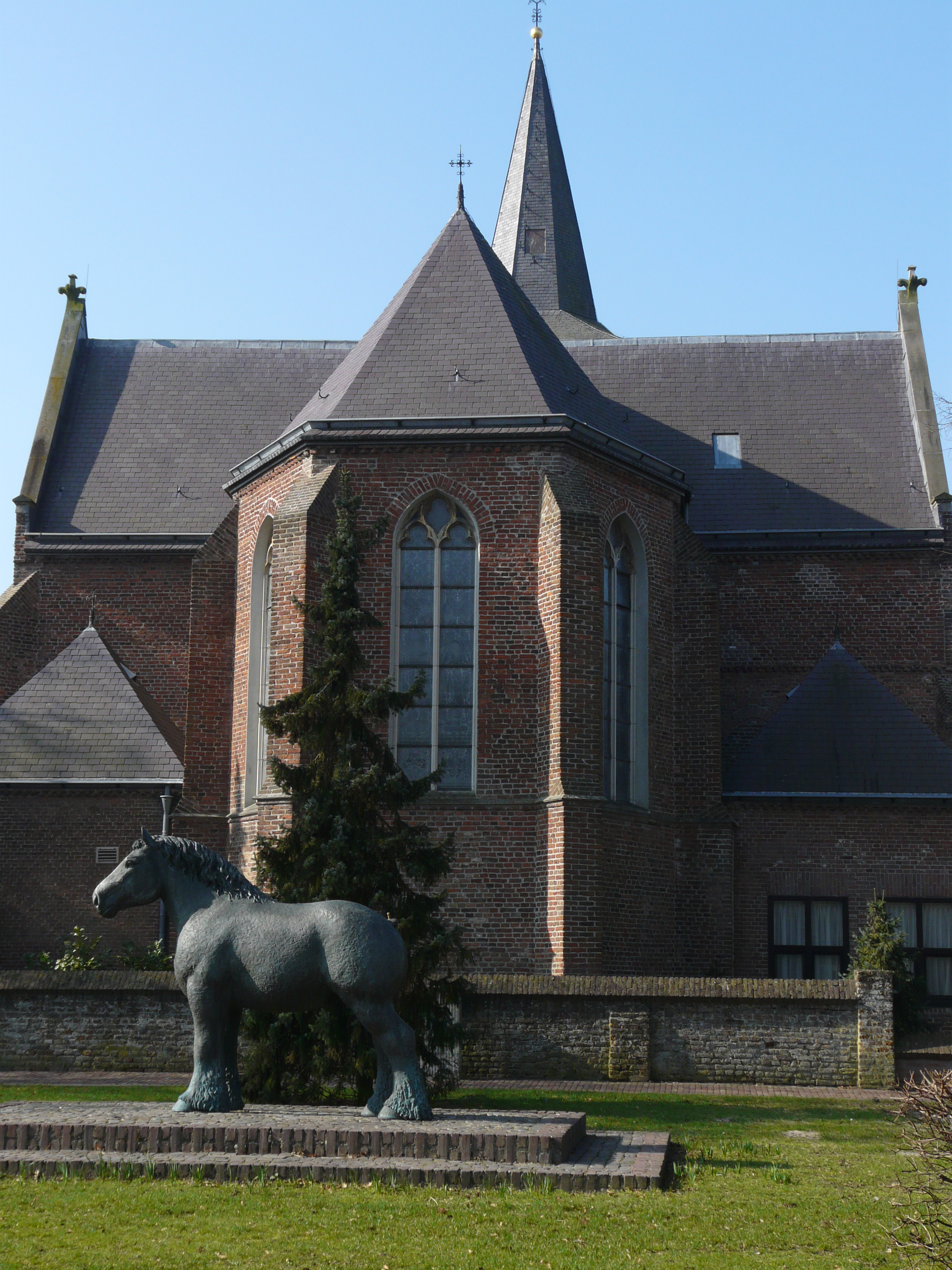
Sint Clemenskerk Gerwen

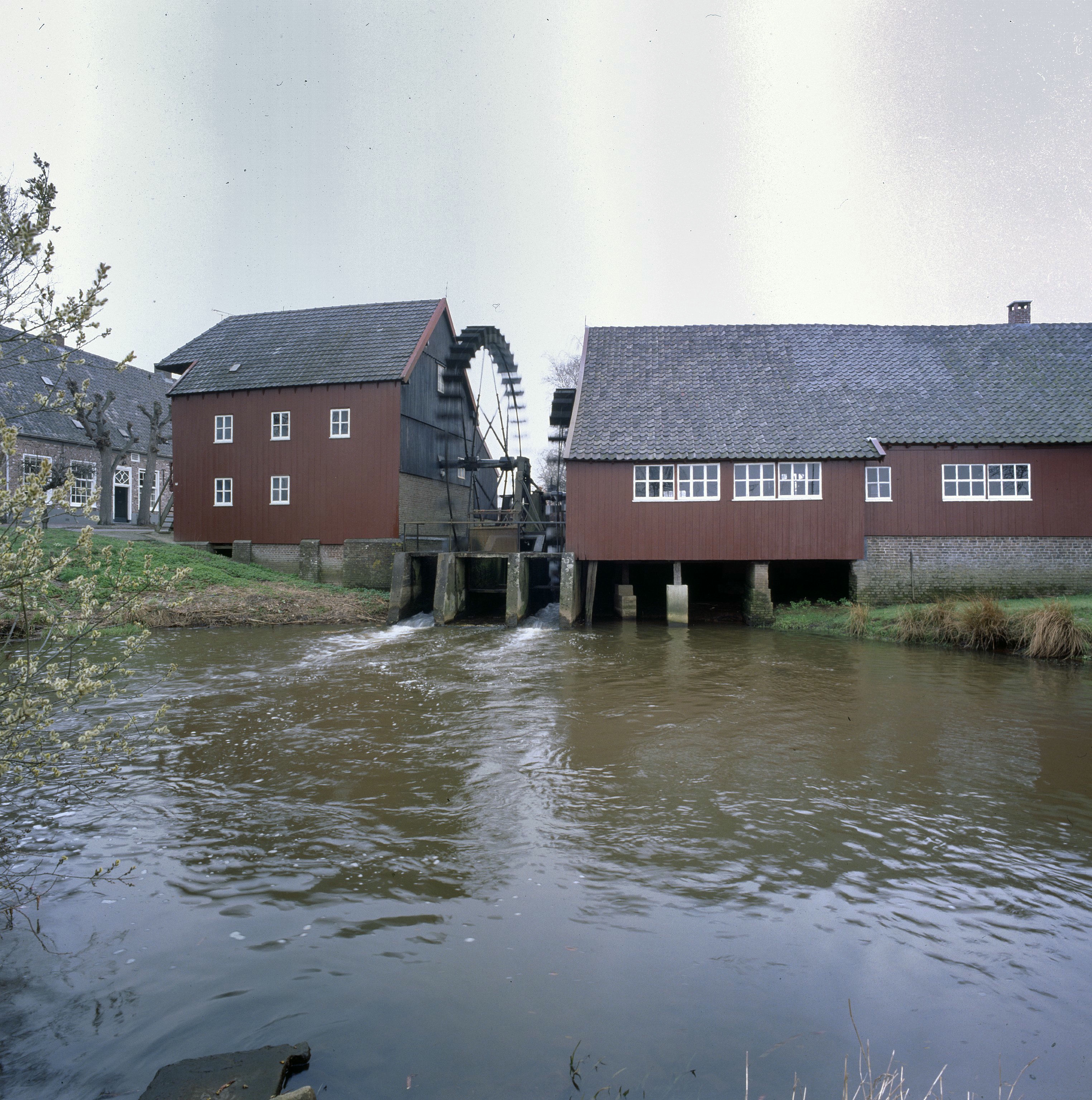
Overzicht - Opwetten
