= Nuenen =

- Town
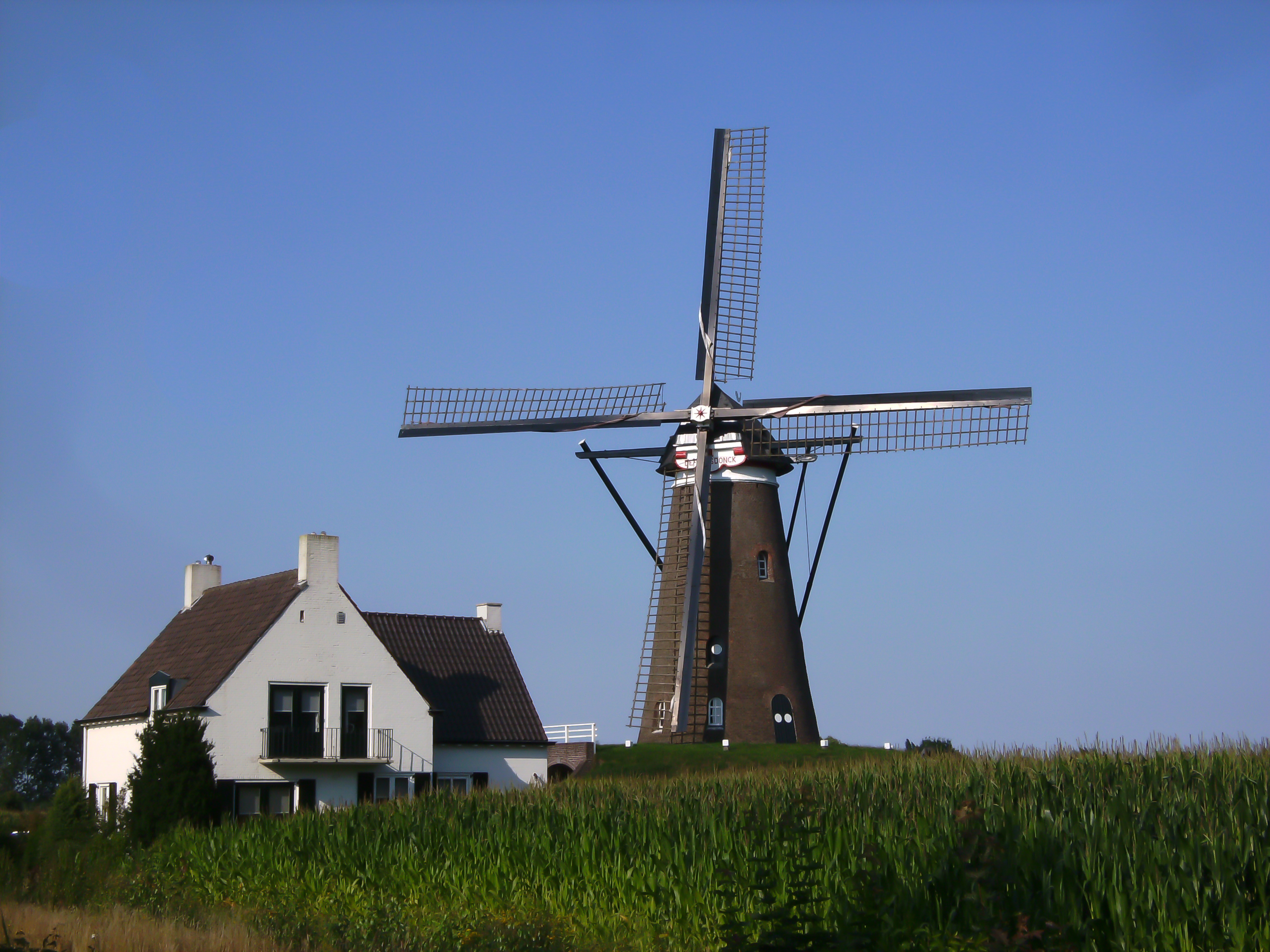
- Nuenen, windmill: de Roosdonck
- Nickname: Mooiste dorp van Nederland
- Location in the province of North Brabant in the Netherlands Nuenen (Netherlands)
- Coordinates: 51°28′24″N 5°32′48″E
- Country: Netherlands
- Province: North Brabant
- Municipality: Nuenen, Gerwen en Nederwetten

Area
  - Total: 18.30 km^{2} (7.07 sq mi)
- Elevation: 16 m (52 ft)

Population (2021)
  - Total: 20,580
  - Density: 1,125/km^{2} (2,913/sq mi)
- Time zone: UTC+1 (CET)
  - Summer (DST): UTC+2 (CEST)
- Postal code: 5670-5674
- Dialing code: 040

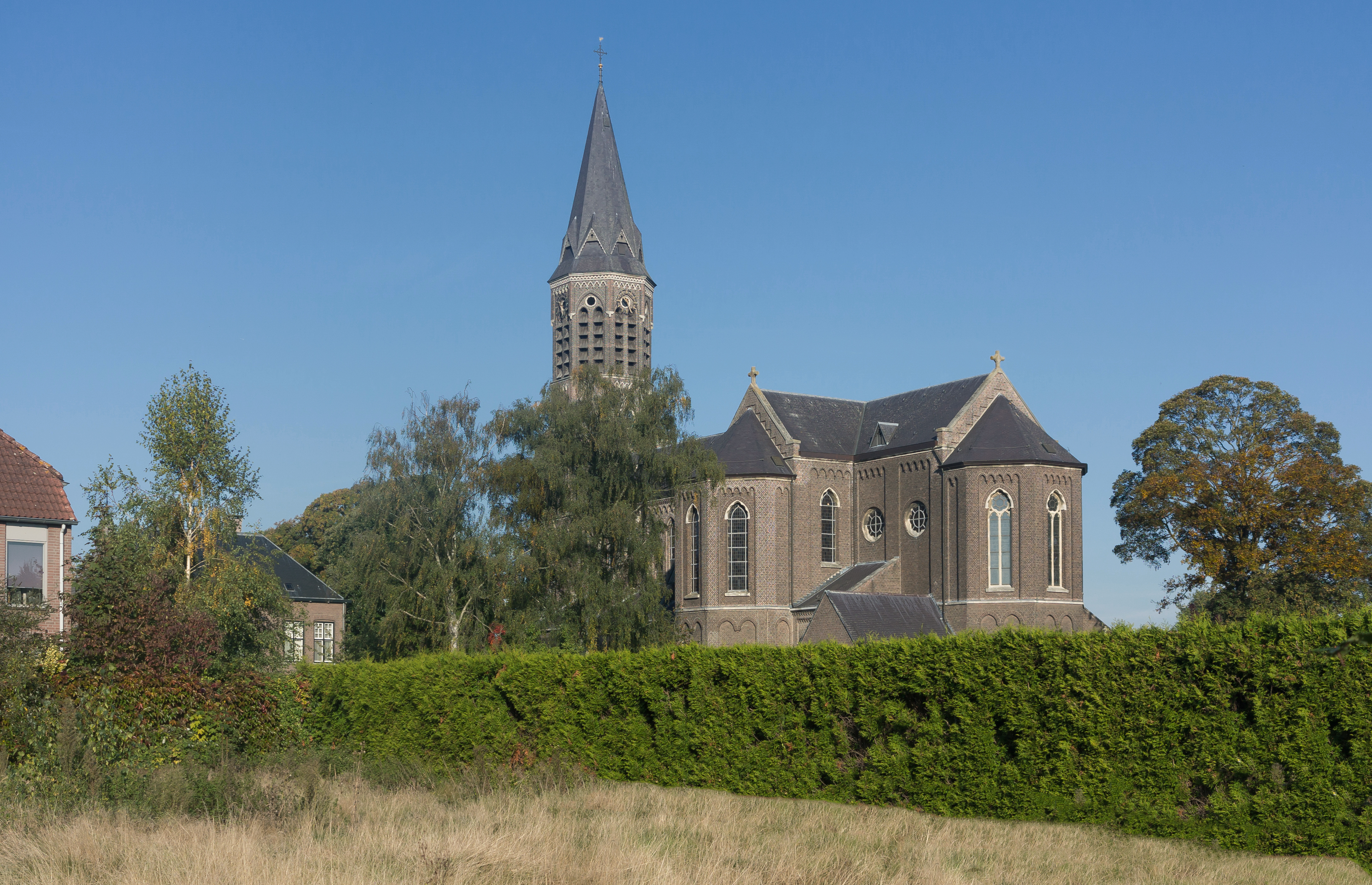
Nuenen, church de Sint Clemenskerk

Nuenen (Dutch pronunciation: [ˈnynə(n)]) is a town in the municipality of Nuenen, Gerwen en Nederwetten in the Netherlands. From 1883 to 1885, Vincent van Gogh lived and worked in Nuenen. In 1944, a battle was fought there during Operation Market Garden. The local dialect is called Peellands. In 2009, Nuenen had a population of 22,437.

== History ==
Nuenen is listed in the 1792 Gazetteer of the Netherlands, which lists it as "a village of Brabant, two leagues W. from Helmont".

=== World War II ===
During Operation Market Garden on 20 September 1944, Nuenen was the scene of a battle involving the American 506th PIR of the 101st Airborne Division and the British 15th/19th The King's Royal Hussars of the 11th Armoured Division equipped with Cromwell tanks, against the German 107th Panzer Brigade. The British lost two tanks. Four American and three British soldiers were killed. The Germans suffered two fatalities. The fight is dramatised in episode 4 "Replacements" of the television series Band of Brothers.

== Dialect ==
The spoken language is Peellands (an East Brabantian dialect, which is very similar to colloquial Dutch).

== Notable residents ==
In 1882 Van Gogh's father became a pastor in Nuenen and the family lived at the vicarage there. After a stay in Drenthe for several months, Van Gogh moved to live with his parents in December 1883 and stayed there until May 1885. During that time he painted many character studies of peasants and weavers that culminated in The Potato Eaters, and paintings of still life. He also painted his father's church, vicarage and its garden, one such work being Congregation Leaving the Reformed Church in Nuenen (Het uitgaan van de hervormde kerk te Nuenen) depicting the church, which is situated in a park area on the corner of Papenvoort Street and Houtrijk Street in the north of Nuenen. This painting was stolen from the Van Gogh Museum in December 2002 and recovered in Italy in September 2016. There is a street named after it in the town, as well as a cafe, college and bar. A statue of Van Gogh is located in the central park of the town.

Theoretical computer scientist Edsger W. Dijkstra lived in Nuenen later in his life, and died there in 2002. The following year, the ACM (Association for Computing Machinery) PODC Influential Paper Award in distributed computing was renamed the Dijkstra Prize in his honour.

Dutch cyclist Steven Kruijswijk was also born in Nuenen and had lived there in his youth.

Musical actress and singer Willemijn Verkaik (1975) also grew up in Nuenen.

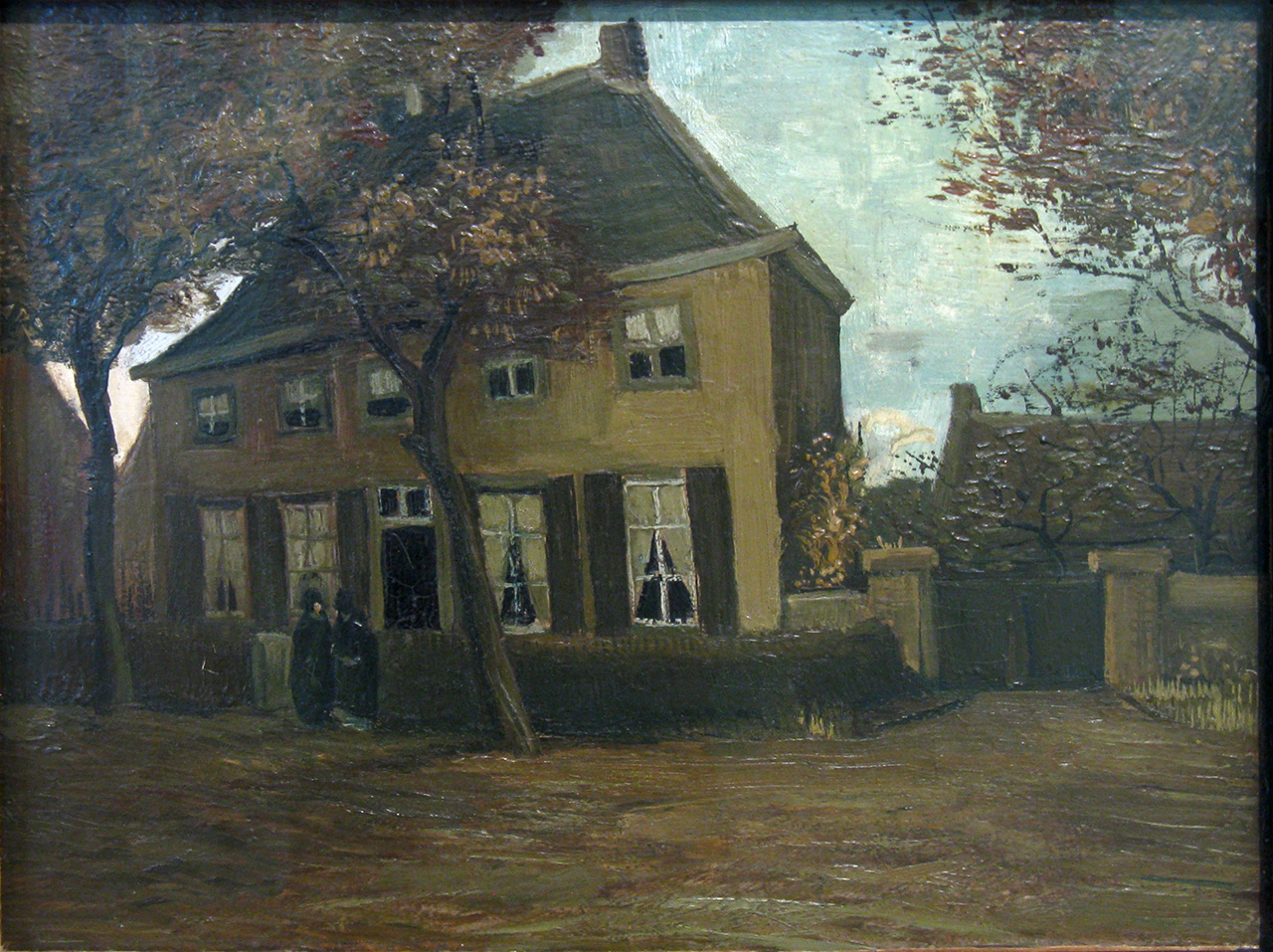
The Vicarage at Nuenen, 1885, Van Gogh Museum, Amsterdam (F182)

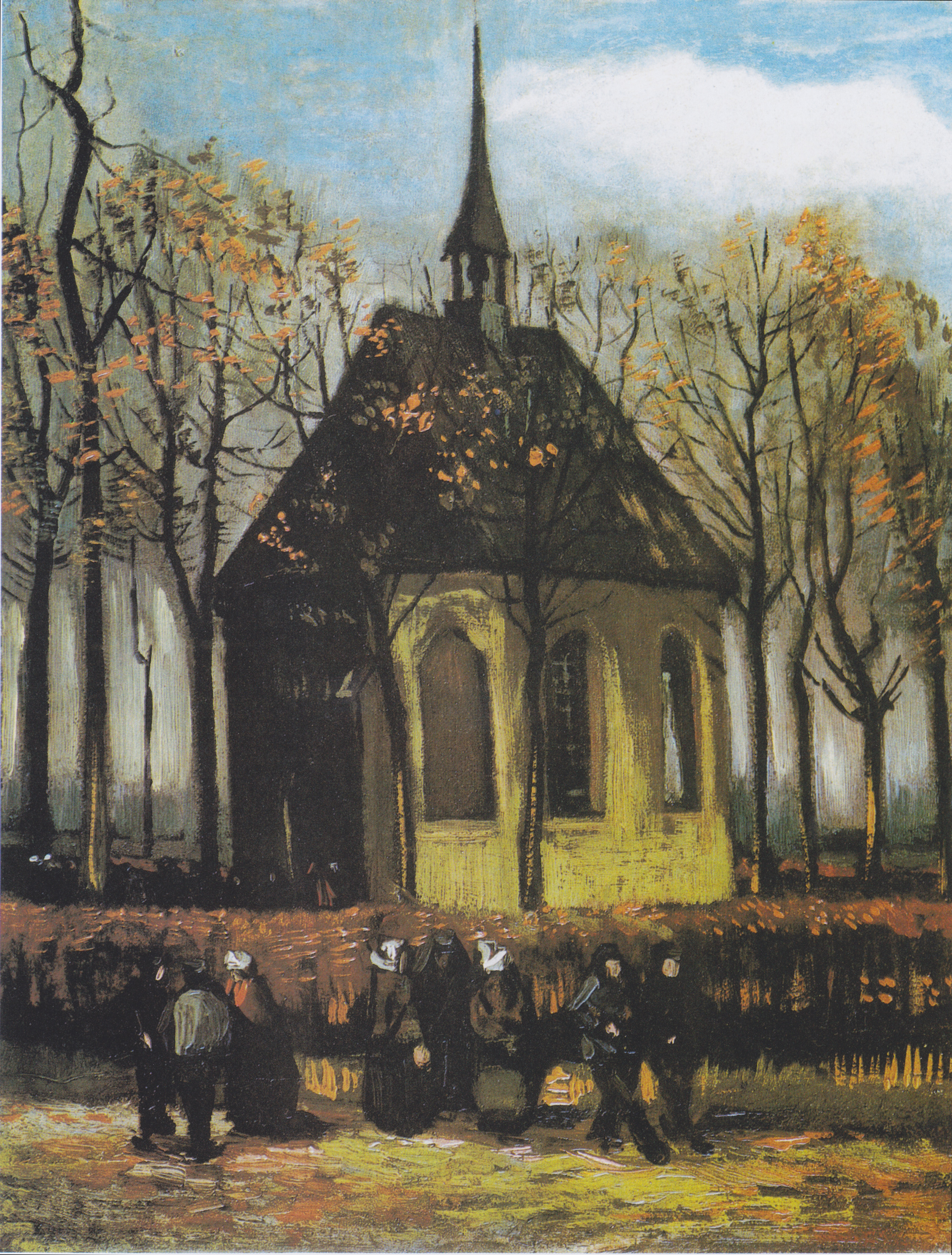
Congregation Leaving the Reformed Church in Nuenen, 1884, Van Gogh Museum, Amsterdam (F25)

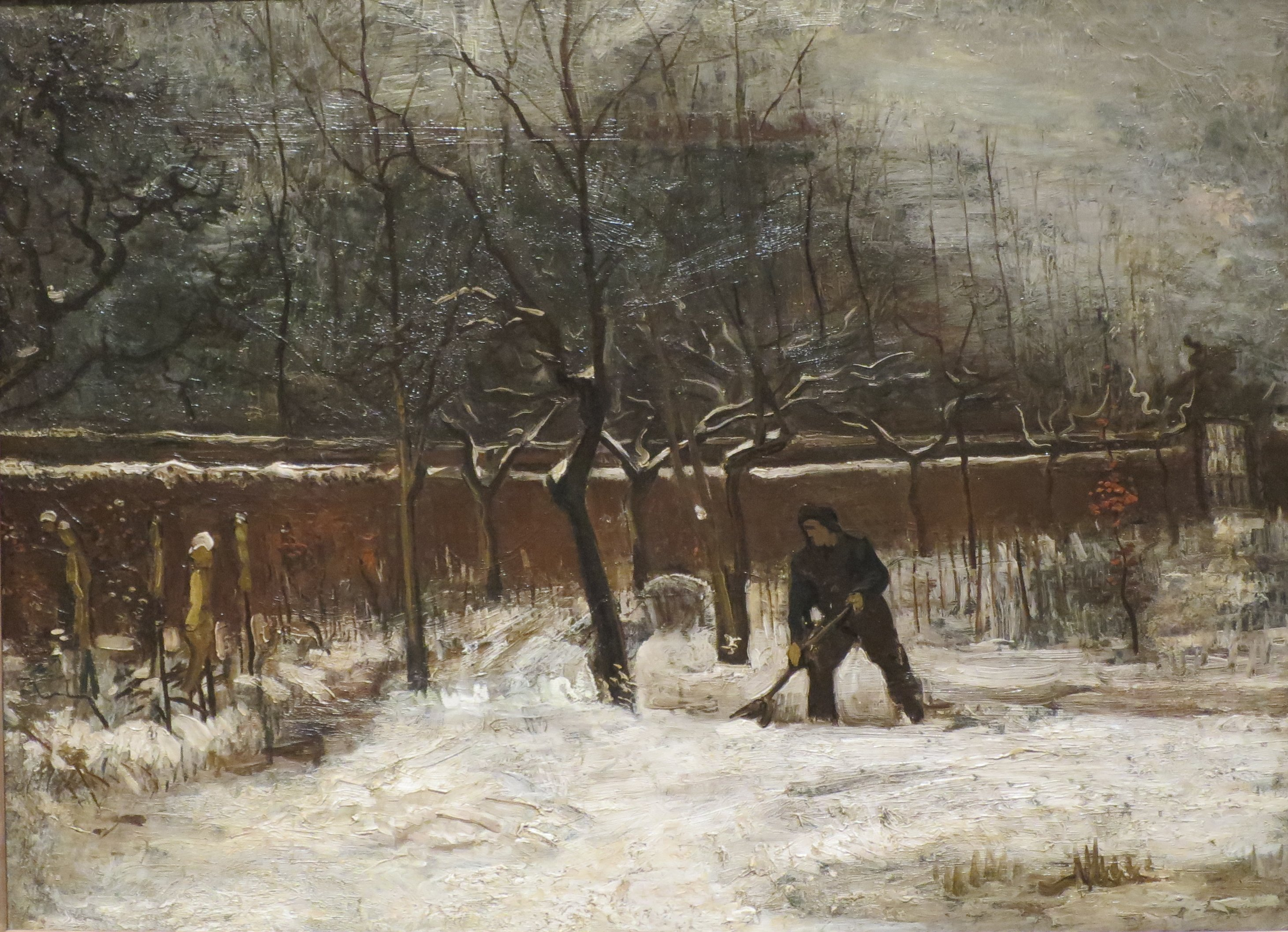
The Rectory Garden in Nuenen in the Snow, January 1885, Norton Simon Museum, Pasadena (F194)

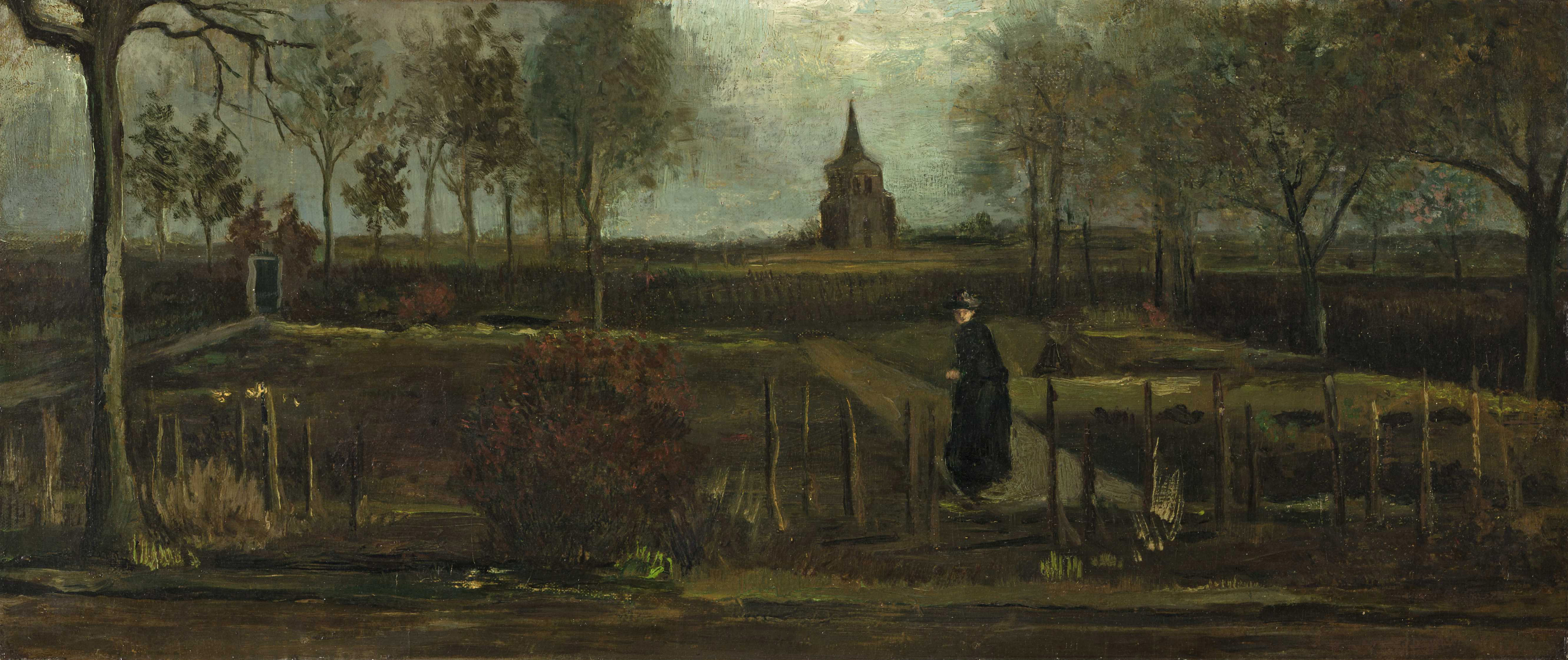
The Parsonage Garden at Nuenen, May 1884.

== See also ==
- Nuenen en Gerwen
