= Mieke Eerkens =

Dutch-American writer

Mieke Eerkens is a Dutch-American writer. Her book, All Ships Follow Me., was published by Picador (imprint) in 2019. Her work has been anthologized in W. W. Norton & Company’s Fakes, edited by David Shields; Best Travel Writing 2011; and Outpost 19’s A Book of Uncommon Prayer, among others. She is a graduate of the University of Iowa’s MFA program in Nonfiction Writing.

== Early life and education ==
Mieke Eerkens grew up in Pacific Palisades, Los Angeles, California in a Dutch immigrant family. She is the middle child of three, and attended Palisades Charter High School. In 2001, she received a Bachelor’s degree in English, Creative Writing with a minor in Cinema Studies, at San Francisco State University. She received her MA in English Literature at Leiden University in 2003. In 2013, she earned an MFA at the University of Iowa’s Nonfiction Writing Program, where she studied under John D'Agata, Ethan Canin, and Geoff Dyer, among others.

== Career ==
Eerkens’ debut book, All Ships Follow Me: A Family Memoir of War Across Three Continents, was published by Picador, an imprint of MacMillan, in April 2019, and recounts her father's childhood internment in a men's labor camp by the Japanese in Java, Indonesia during World War II, and her mother's experience in a children's home after her parents were arrested as members of the Nazi-allied NSB party after the German capitulation in the Netherlands. The Historical Novel Society described the book as a “war memoir that reads as hauntingly and movingly as a novel ... Highly recommended," and Kirkus Reviews called it a “poignant book” which “sheds new light on the history of World War II.” Pop Matters reviewer Chris Ingalls wrote of the book that “with All Ships Follow Me, Mieke Eerkens has written a unique and harrowing account of (WWII) through the history of her parents.” While reception was largely positive in media, some online controversy was generated by a reviewer for National Public Radio, who argued that the narratives of children of oppressors should not be publicly told, writing that “the book itself is unimpeachably competent… However, the sheer fact of the book rustles up rustles up troubling questions about memory, vengeance, oppression and the privilege to be heard.” The translation rights to the book were sold to De Geus in The Netherlands, and to Agora in Poland.

Eerkens’ work has appeared in publications such as The Atlantic, The Rumpus, Los Angeles Review of Books, Pank, Guernica, Catapult, and Creative Nonfiction. Her work has been anthologized in Norton’s Fakes: An Anthology of Pseudo-Interviews, Faux-Lectures, Quasi-Letters, "Found" Texts, and Other Fraudulent Artifacts edited by David Shields; A Book of Uncommon Prayer, edited by Matthew Vollmer; and Best Travel Writing 2011, with an introduction by Pico Iyer. Her essay, “Seep,” about the Cosco Busan oil spill, was a winner in the Walton Sustainability Solutions Essay Award in collaboration with Creative Nonfiction and was selected as a notable essay in Best American Science and Nature Writing 2015

Eerkens has held teaching positions at the University of Iowa, UCLA Extension Writers' Program, the Iowa Summer Writing Festival, and Amsterdam University College.

== Awards and honors ==
Mieke Eerkens is the recipient of a 2011 Stanley Foundation Grant, the 2013 Goldfarb Fellowship at the Virginia Center for the Creative Arts, a 2013 James Merrill House Fellowship, two Pushcart Prize nominations, the 2014 Elfster Distinguished Fellowship at Hambidge Center for the Arts, and a 2014 recipient of a John Anson Kittredge Fund grant, among others.
