= The Potato Eaters =

Painting by Vincent van Gogh

- De Aardappeleters (Dutch)
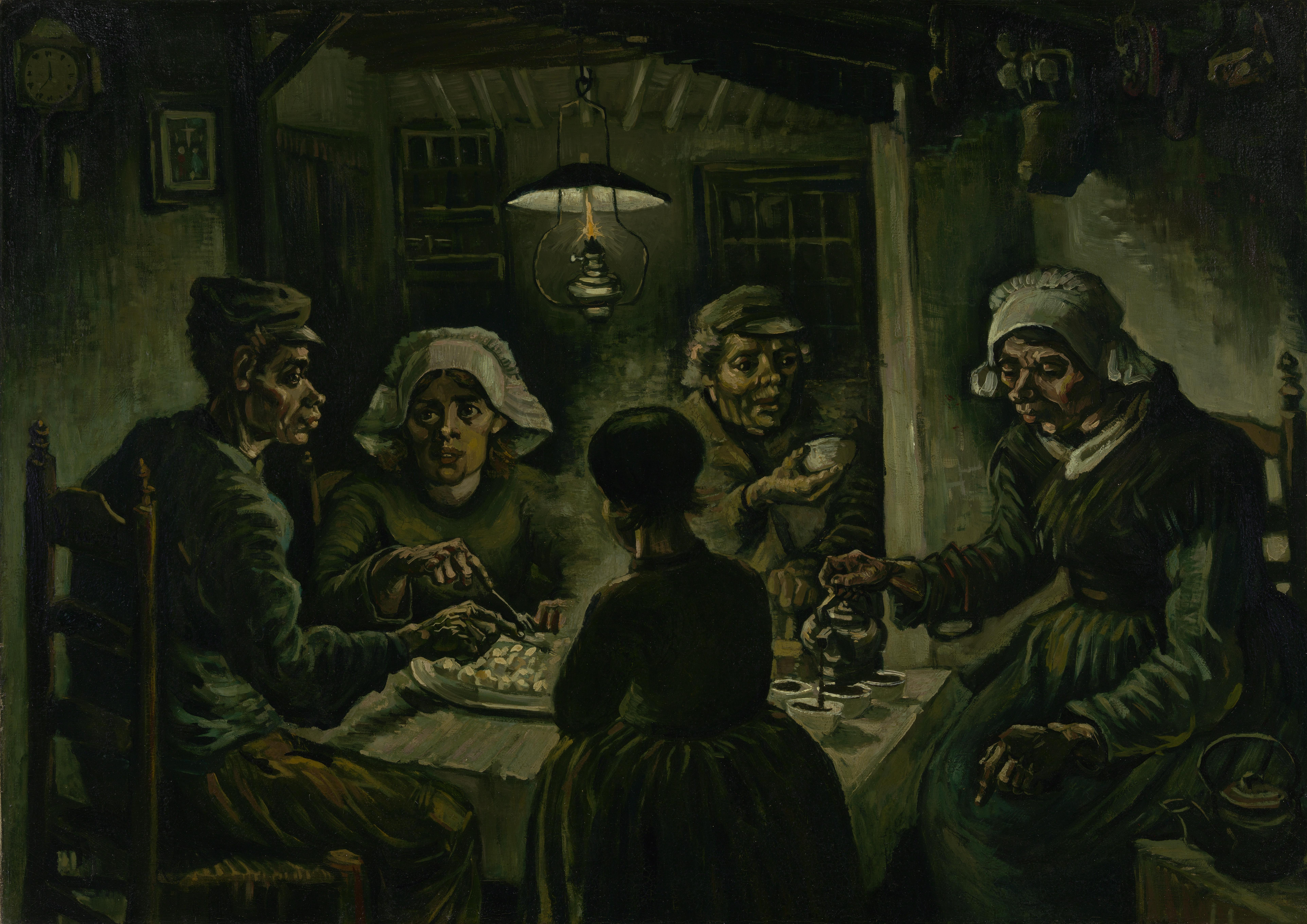
- Artist: Vincent van Gogh
- Year: 1885
- Catalogue: F82; JH764
- Medium: Oil on canvas
- Dimensions: 82 cm × 114 cm (32 in × 45 in)
- Location: Van Gogh Museum, Amsterdam

The Potato Eaters (Dutch: De Aardappeleters) is an oil painting by Dutch artist Vincent van Gogh painted in April to May of 1885 in Nuenen, Netherlands.

It is in the Van Gogh Museum in Amsterdam. The original oil sketch is at the Kröller-Müller Museum in Otterlo. He also made lithographs of the image, which are held in collections including the Museum of Modern Art in New York City. The painting is considered to be one of Van Gogh's masterpieces.

== Composition ==
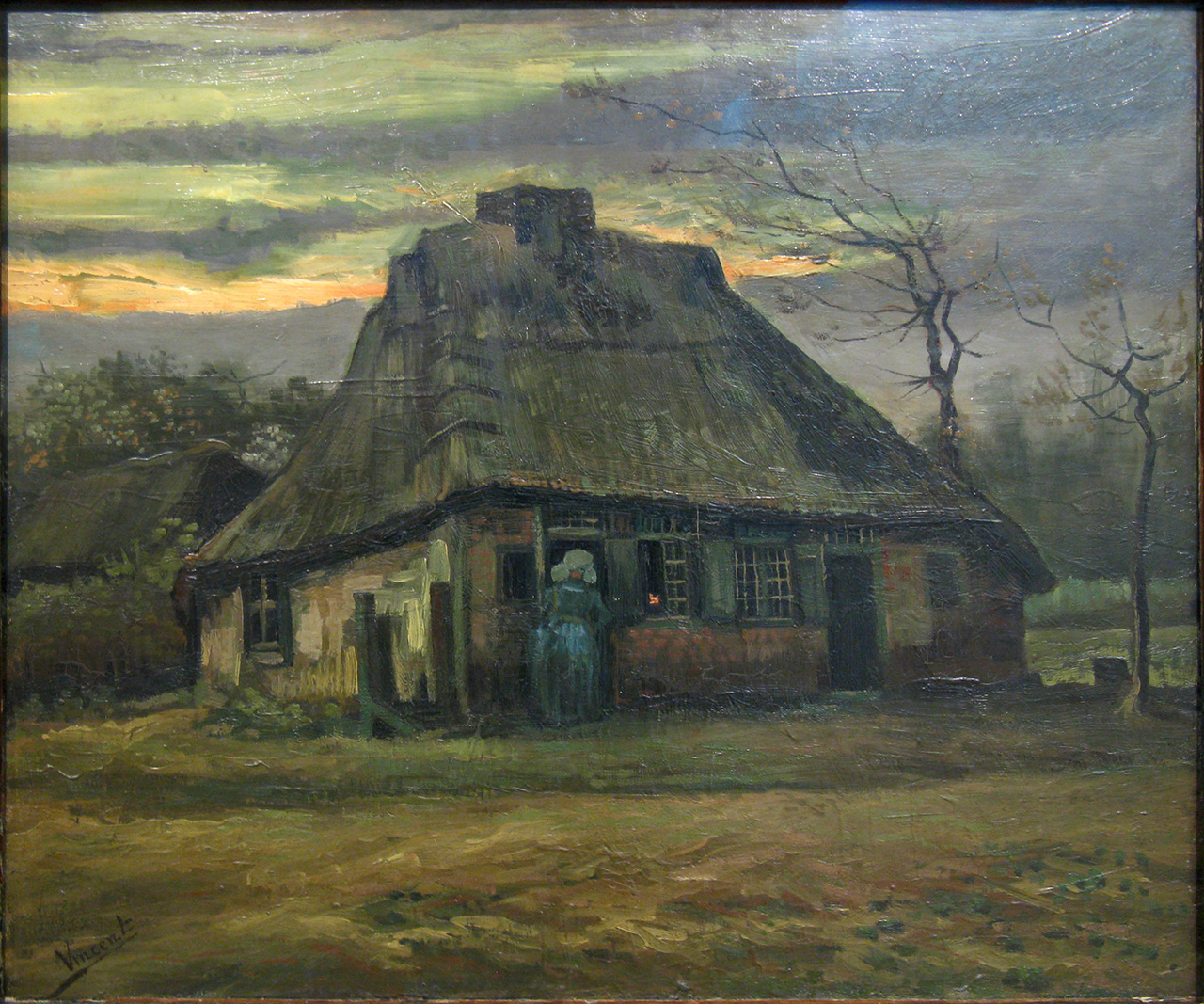
The Cottage, 1885, Van Gogh Museum, Amsterdam (F83). The cottage was home to two families, one of which was the de Groots who were the subjects of The Potato Eaters

During March and the beginning of April 1885, Van Gogh sketched studies for the painting and corresponded with his brother Theo, who was not impressed with his current work nor the sketches Van Gogh sent him in Paris. He began working on The Potato Eaters while living with his parents in Nuenen, a rural town which was home to many farmers, labourers and weavers. He worked on the painting from 13 April until the beginning of May, when it was mostly done except for minor changes that he made with a small brush later the same year.

Van Gogh discussed The Potato Eaters in a letter to his brother. He said that he wanted people who see it to:

…get the idea that these folk, who are eating their potatoes by the light of their little lamp, have tilled the earth themselves with these hands they are putting in the dish, and so it speaks of manual labour and–that they have thus honestly earned their food. I wanted it to give the idea of a wholly different way of life from ours.

…anyone who would rather see insipidly pretty peasants can go ahead. For my part, I’m convinced that in the long run it produces better results to paint them in their coarseness than to introduce conventional sweetness.

In the context of that discussion Van Gogh added his thoughts on peasant paintings:

A peasant girl is more beautiful than a lady–to my mind–in her dusty and patched blue skirt and jacket, which have acquired the most delicate nuances from weather, wind and sun. But–if she puts–a lady’s costume on, then the genuineness is lost. A peasant in his suit of fustian in the fields is finer than when he goes to church on Sundays in a sort of gentleman’s coat. … If a peasant painting smells of bacon, smoke, potato steam–fine–that’s not unhealthy–if a stable smells of manure–very well, that’s what a stable’s for–if the field has an odour of ripe wheat or potatoes or of guano and manure–that’s really healthy … But a peasant painting mustn’t become perfumed.

Writing to his sister Willemina two years later in Paris, Van Gogh still considered The Potato Eaters his most successful painting: "What I think about my own work is that the painting of the peasants eating potatoes that I did in Nuenen is after all the best thing I did". However, the work was criticized by his friend Anthon van Rappard soon after it was painted. This was a blow to Van Gogh's confidence as an emerging artist, and he wrote back to his friend, "you... had no right to condemn my work in the way you did" (July 1885), and later, "I am always doing what I can't do yet in order to learn how to do it." (August 1885).

== Versions ==
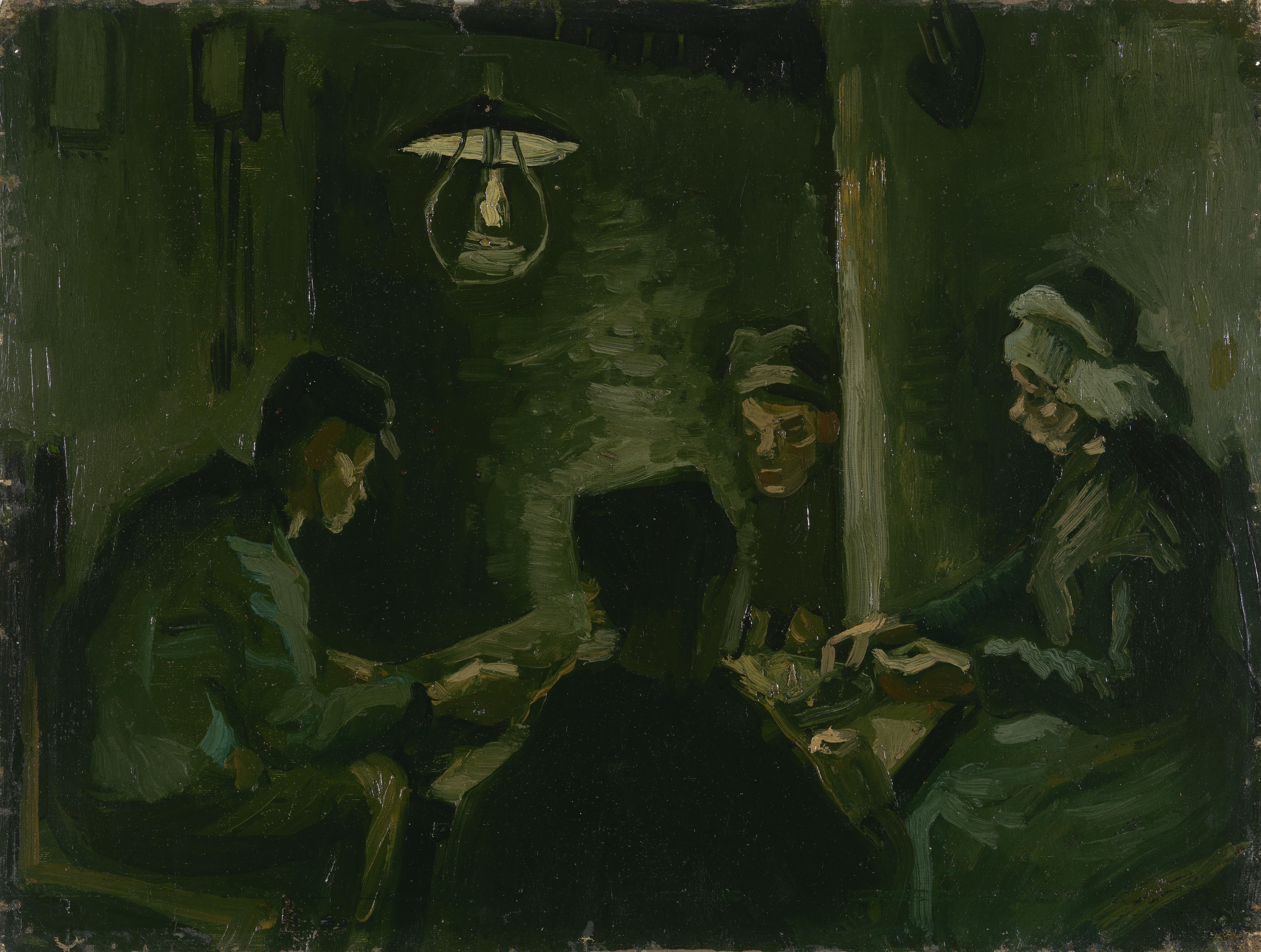
Study for The Potato Eaters, 1885, Van Gogh Museum, Amsterdam

Second Study for The Potato Eaters, 1885, Kröller-Müller Museum, Otterlo

== Lithograph ==
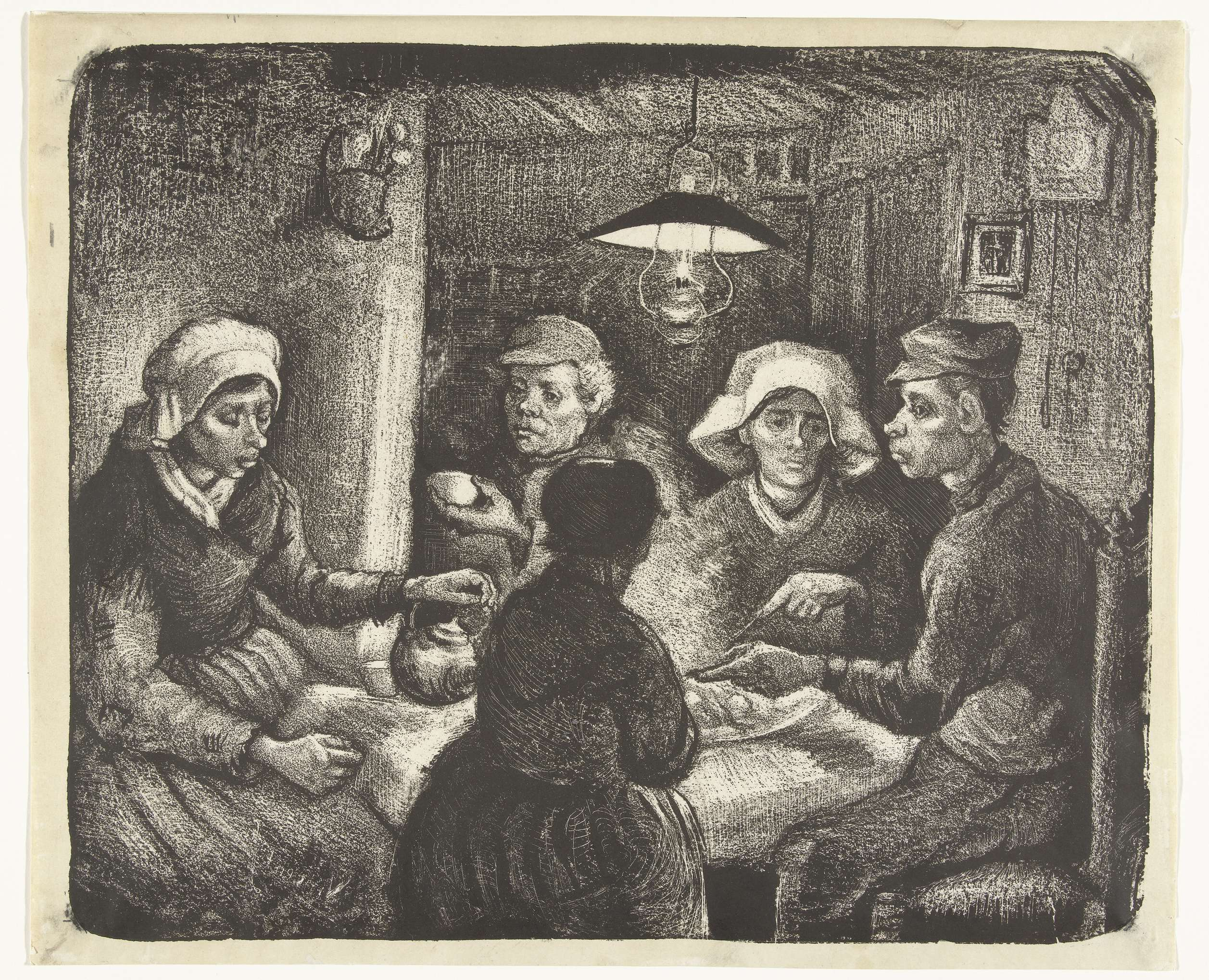
Lithograph (April 1885), reversed, Rijksmuseum, Amsterdam

Van Gogh made a lithograph of the composition The Potato Eaters before embarking on the painting proper. He sent impressions to his brother, and in a letter to a friend wrote that he made the lithograph from memory in the space of a day.

Van Gogh had first experimented with lithography in The Hague in the year 1882. Though he appreciated small scale graphic work and was an enthusiastic collector of English engravings he worked relatively little in graphic mediums. In a letter dated around 3 December 1882 he remarks

I believe, though, that it would be a great mistake to imagine that such things as, for instance, the print The Grace (a family of woodcutters or peasants at table) were created at a stroke in their final form. No, in most cases the solidity and pith of the small is only obtained through much more serious study than is imagined by those who think lightly of the task of illustrating ... Anyway, some paintings in their huge frames look very substantial, and later one is surprised when they actually leave behind such an empty and dissatisfied feeling. On the other hand, one overlooks many an unpretentious woodcut or lithograph or etching now and then, but comes back to it and becomes more and more attached to it with time, and senses something great in it.

== Influence of the Hague School ==
Van Gogh is often associated in people's minds with the Post-Impressionist movement, but in fact his artistic roots lay much closer to home in the artists of the Hague School such as Anton Mauve and Jozef Israëls.

In a letter to his brother Theo written mid-June 1884, Vincent remarks:

When I hear you talk about a lot of new names, it's not always possible for me to understand when I've seen absolutely nothing by them. And from what you said about 'Impressionism', I’ve grasped that it's something different from what I thought it was, but it's still not entirely clear to me what one should understand by it. But for my part, I find so tremendously much in Israëls, for instance, that I'm not particularly curious about or eager for something different or newer.

Before Vincent painted The Potato Eaters, Israëls had painted a similar subject―A Peasant Family at the Table and, based on a comment in a letter to Theo 11 March 1882, Vincent may have seen this or a variation of it. Compositionally, the two have similarities: both paintings show a peasant family at a table, and both have a figure in the center whose back is to the viewer.

== Theft ==
Thieves stole the early version of The Potato Eaters, the Weaver's Interior, and Dried Sunflowers from the Kröller-Müller Museum in December 1988. In April 1989, the thieves returned Weaver's Interior in an attempt to gain a $2.5 million ransom. The police recovered the other two on 14 July 1989; no ransom was paid.

On 14 April 1991, the Vincent van Gogh National Museum was robbed of twenty major paintings including the final version of The Potato Eaters. However, the getaway car suffered a blown tire, and the thieves were forced to flee, leaving the paintings behind. Thirty-five minutes after the robbery, the paintings were recovered.

== See also ==
- List of works by Vincent van Gogh

== Sources ==
- Crispino, Enrica (2008). Van Gogh. The Oliver Press, Inc. ISBN 978-1934545058.
- McQuillan, Melissa (1989). Van Gogh. London: Thames and Hudson. ISBN 1-86046-859-4.
- Naifeh, Steven; Smith, Gregory White (2011). Van Gogh: The Life. New York: Random House. ISBN 978-0-375-50748-9.
