= Annemiek Padt-Jansen =

Dutch harpist and politician

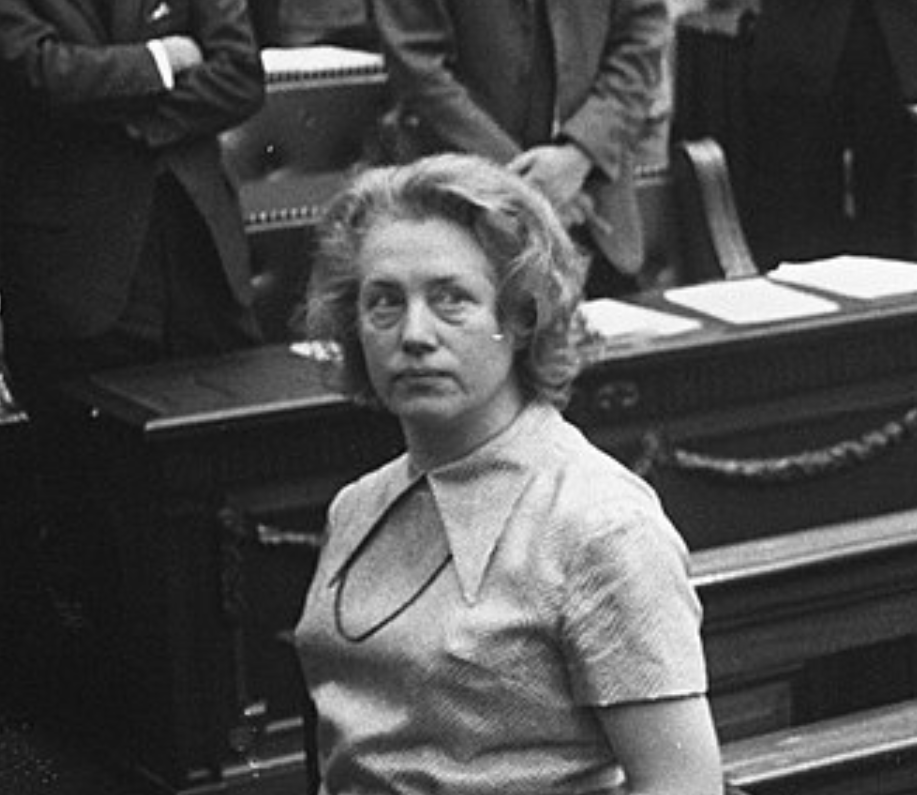

Member of the House of Representatives
- In office 3 June 1969 – 10 May 1971
- In office 14 March 1972 – 7 December 1972

Personal details
- Born: Anna Maria Catharina Padt-Jansen; August 15, 1921 Naarden, Netherlands
- Died: 18 March 2007 (aged 85) Bilthoven, Netherlands
- Party: Labour Party (PvdA)
- Spouse: Frans Jacob Padt
- Education: Conservatorium van Amsterdam
- Occupation: Harpist, Politician

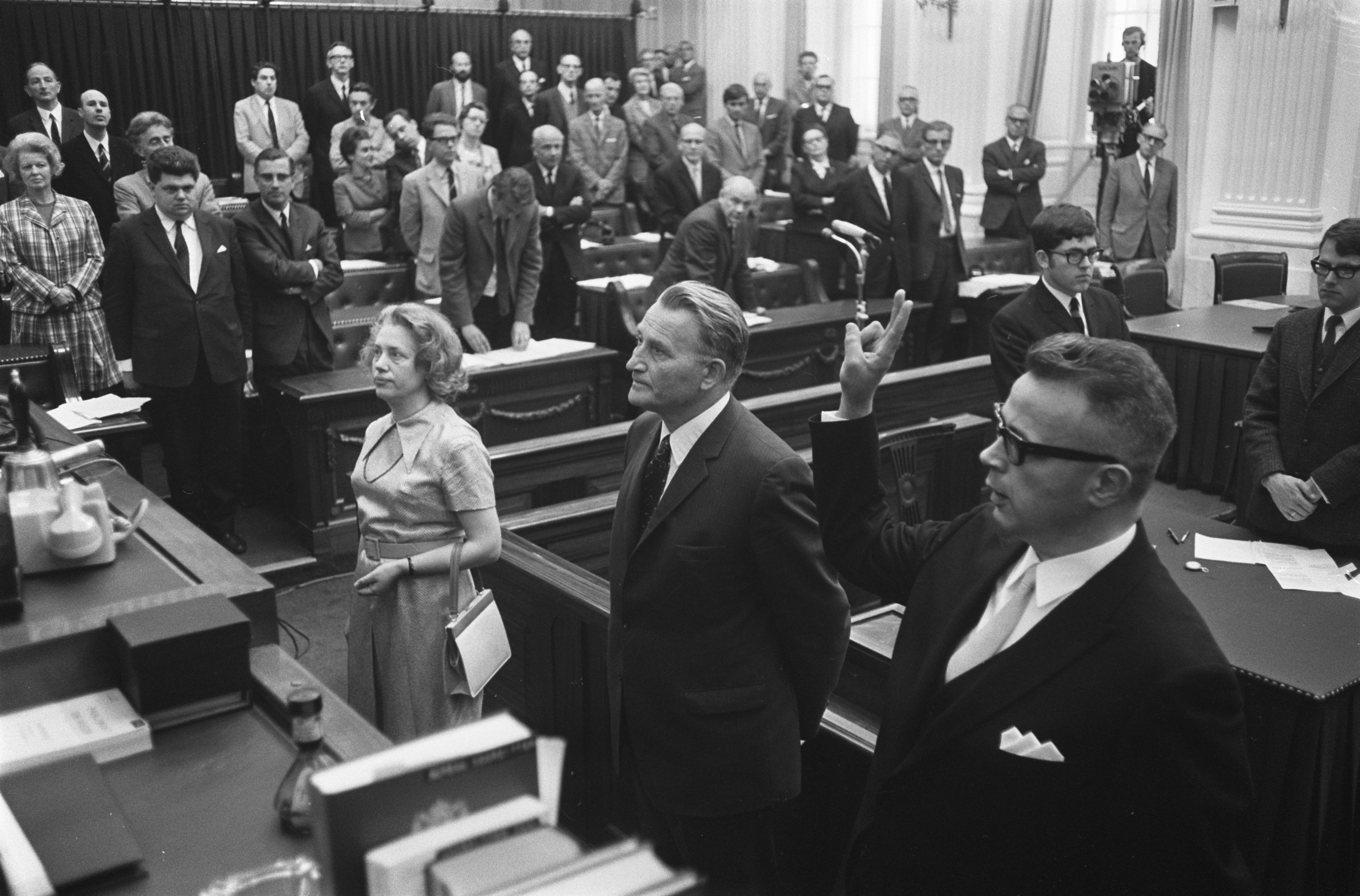
Swearing in of new members of the House of Representatives in 1969. Annemiek Padt-Jansen is standing on the front left.

Anna Maria Catharina "Annemiek" Padt-Jansen (15 August 1921 – 18 March 2007) was a Dutch harpist and politician. She was a member of the House of Representatives for the Labour Party from June 1969 until 10 May 1971 and again from 14 March 1972 until 7 December 1972. She was also a member of the board of the public broadcasting association VARA. She was a sister of the stand-up comedian Fons Jansen.

== Political Positions ==
During her time in parliament she was focused on children's rights and the emancipation of women and sexual minorities. Despite being a Roman Catholic, she believed that religion did not have a place in public life, and when sworn in as a member of parliament, she chose to take a secular, rather than religious, oath.

== Personal life ==
Padt-Jansen was a Roman Catholic. She was married to Frans Jacob Padt until his death in 1969, and never remarried.
