= Essen, Belgium =

Essen
- Municipality
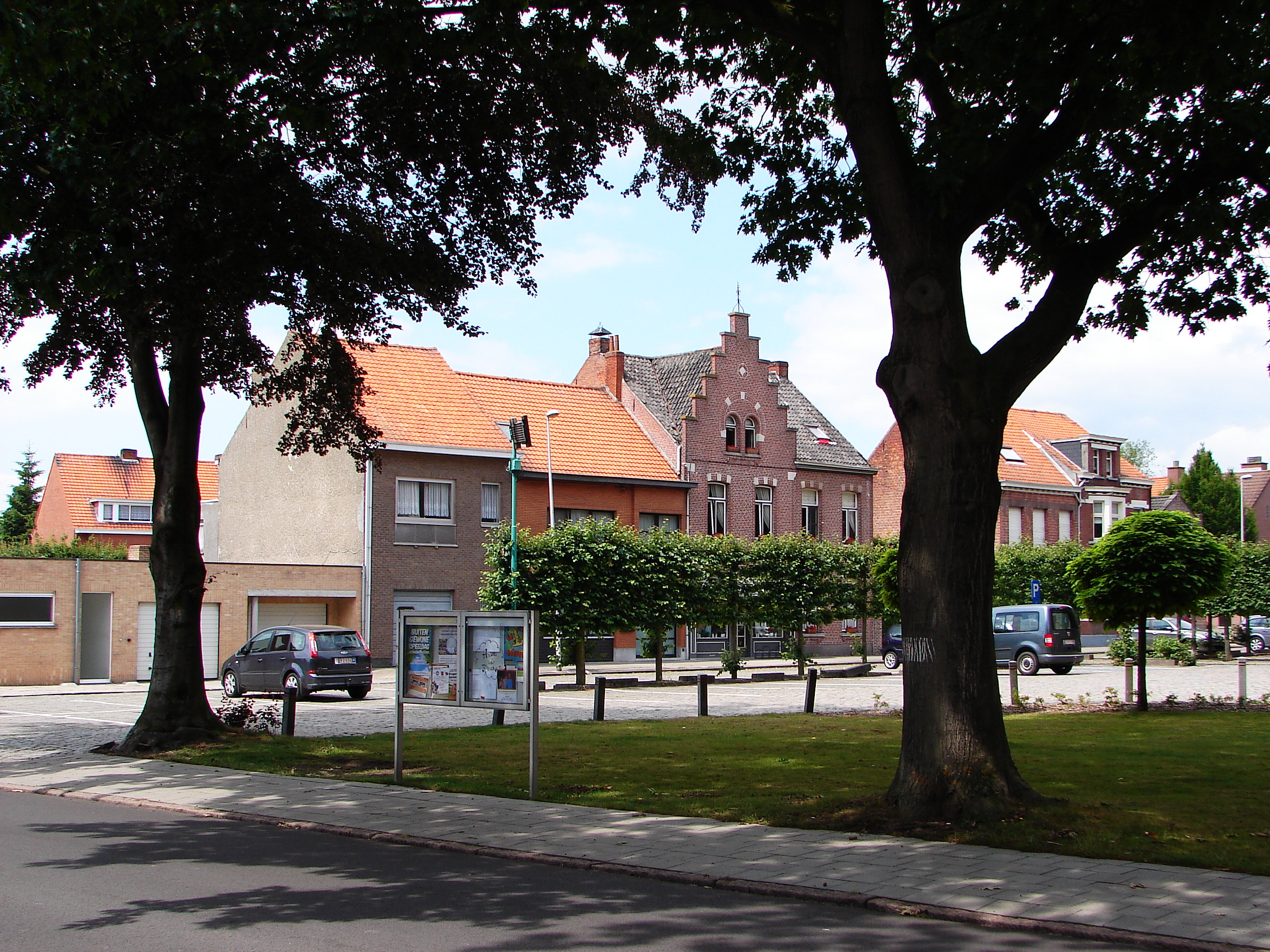

- Flag Coat of arms

- Location of Essen in the province of Antwerp
- Interactive map of Essen
- Location in Belgium
- Coordinates: 51°28′N 04°28′E
- Country: Belgium
- Community: Flemish Community
- Region: Flemish Region
- Province: Antwerp
- Arrondissement: Antwerp

Government
  - Mayor: Geert Vandekeybus
  - Governing party: N-VA/PLE

Area
  - Total: 47.57 km^{2} (18.37 sq mi)

Population (2020-01-01)
  - Total: 19,162
  - Density: 402.8/km^{2} (1,043/sq mi)
- Postal codes: 2910
- NIS code: 11016
- Area codes: 03
- Website: www.essen.be

Essen (Dutch pronunciation: [ˈɛsə(n)]) is a town and municipality in the Belgian province of Antwerp, notable for being bordered by the Netherlands on three sides. As of September 2022, it has a population of 19,029 residents. The town belongs to both the electoral canton of Brecht and the judicial canton of Kapellen and is situated in the region of Noorderkempen.

== Toponymy ==
Throughout history the spelling of "Essen" varied, including "Esshen," "Essche(n)," and "Esse." These names are believed to refer to elevated fields near a watercourse or to settlements situated along a brook. Additionally, the Dutch word for ash tree is "es", with the plural being "essen". Because ash wood was historically often used in shipbuilding, "essen" also refereed to a ‘boat of ash wood’ in Old Dutch.

== History ==
=== Prehistory ===
Archaeological evidence suggests that the area around Essen has been inhabited since prehistoric times. Finds from four different sites indicate that around 8,500 years ago, nomadic tribes roamed the region, making tools like flint arrowheads. However, the limited number of sites makes it difficult to draw broader conclusions.

=== Abbey of Tongerlo ===
In 1159, Berner van Rijsbergen granted Essen as an allod to Tongerlo Abbey. However, the abbey had to share her lordship rights with the Dukes of Brabant. Essen, along with Kalmthout and Huijbergen, formed one seigniory under the abbey's rule until the French Revolution.

=== Lootings ===
Essen was sacked twice, first by Maarten van Rossum's troops in 1542 and then by forces of Marshal Armand de Gontaut, Baron of Biron, in 1583.

=== Border community and coat of arms ===
After gaining independence in 1795, Essen adopted the coat of arms of Prelate Hermans, the last abbot of Tongerlo. The symbols on the coat of arms—two ox heads and a lamb—reflect both the town's agricultural heritage and its virtues of steadfastness and patience. In 1802, Essen became an independent parish, having previously been part of the parish of Nispen.

=== Belgian Revolution ===
After the Congress of Vienna in 1815, Essen became part of the United Kingdom of the Netherlands, under the rule of William I of Orange-Nassau. However, when the Southern Netherlands seceded to form present-day Belgium in 1830, Essen's geopolitical status shifted, turning it into a border town. This transition was marked by significant military conflict, most notably the Battle of Essen on 21 November 1830, during the Belgian War of Independence.

In the years following the secession, Walloon soldiers were stationed to guard the newly established border. Tensions escalated further on 20 November 1831, when these soldiers moved to Roosendaal, inciting a strong Dutch military response the following day. During a high mass, 4,000 Dutch soldiers entered and searched Essen, resulting in the death of five soldiers and two villagers. This event is known as the Battle of the Hill.

=== Economy ===
In an agreement signed on 9 July 1852, Belgium and the Netherlands paved the way for a new railroad connecting Antwerp and Rotterdam. Constructed between 1852 and 1854, the Antwerp-Lage Zwaluwe rail line included a key border station in Essen. Interestingly, the line bypassed the city of Breda, a decision influenced by one of the founding members of the Société Anonyme des chemins de fer d'Anvers à Rotterdam, who owned land in Essen. This new transit route attracted affluent residents from Antwerp seeking tranquility, while also facilitating easier access to educational and employment opportunities in Antwerp for the local populace.

Essen Railway Station has historically been the final Belgian stop before the Dutch border, serving as a significant border checkpoint between the two countries. The station's multiple adjustment tracks are vestiges of its role in border control. The introduction of the railway accelerated Essen's development, creating numerous job opportunities and establishing the station as a mandatory stop for international trains. In the contemporary setting, the station offers an Intercity (IC) connection to Antwerp and Brussels-Midi, along with a local train service to Roosendaal.

Further adding to its historical significance, the border station has housed quarantine stables since 1896. These were primarily used to isolate cattle and assess them for contagious diseases, a practice that continued until the 1970s. Recognizing their historical value, the Quarantine Stables received legal protection as a monument in 1994.

=== World War I ===
During the First World War, Essen found itself isolated from the outside world. German forces, opting not to encircle the town's geographically protruding "hump" with barbed wire, instead installed what came to be known as the "Wire of Death." This deadly barrier is commemorated in numerous artworks displayed in both Essen and neighboring Kalmthout. Meanwhile, the Netherlands, maintaining its neutrality, erected similar barriers on the remaining border stretches. Despite this isolation, smuggling activities thrived in the area.

=== World War II ===
The end of the Second World War saw German forces leaving a swath of destruction in their wake. Notably, several churches and their towers, such as O.-L.-V. Geboortekerk in Essen-Centre, Sint-Jan-Baptistkerk in Wildert, and Sint-Vincentius-à-Paulokerk in Horendonk, were demolished. These had been considered strategic vantage points. Only a few places of worship, including the Eucharistic Heart Church at College, St. Anthony of Padua Church at Essen-Statie, and St. Peter's Church at Hoek, were spared. Moreover, the town suffered from misplaced V1 and V2 rocket attacks, originally aimed at the port of Antwerp.

=== Post-war history ===
In 1959, a new customs office rose on Nieuwstraat, the very site where the O.-L.-V. Geboortekerk (Church of the Nativity) once stood before its destruction in World War II. Essen claimed the title of second-busiest road office on the Belgian-Dutch border, right behind Wuustwezel, until it closed on 1 January 1993.

Since 1976, Essen has maintained civic ties with Essen in Oldenburg, Germany.

The landscape of local governance saw a shake-up in 1977. Municipal borders and territories were rationalized, culminating in the formation of Essen-Hoek. Although Hoek had been around for centuries, it was fragmented into Kalmthoutsehoek and Essen-Hoek (also known as Moerkant). Given that the parish of Hoek had already existed for 150 years, this administrative unification served more as a formality than a revolution.

== Geography ==
Essen holds the distinction of being Belgium's third most northern municipality, flanked by the municipality of Kalmthout and the Dutch border. This unique geographic status, shared only with Momignies, means Essen borders just one other Belgian municipality. The rest of its neighbors are Dutch. Geographically, Essen's shape resembles a "hump," positioning it as the most northwestern municipality in the Kempen region and the northernmost in Noorderkempen.

=== Towns / Districts ===
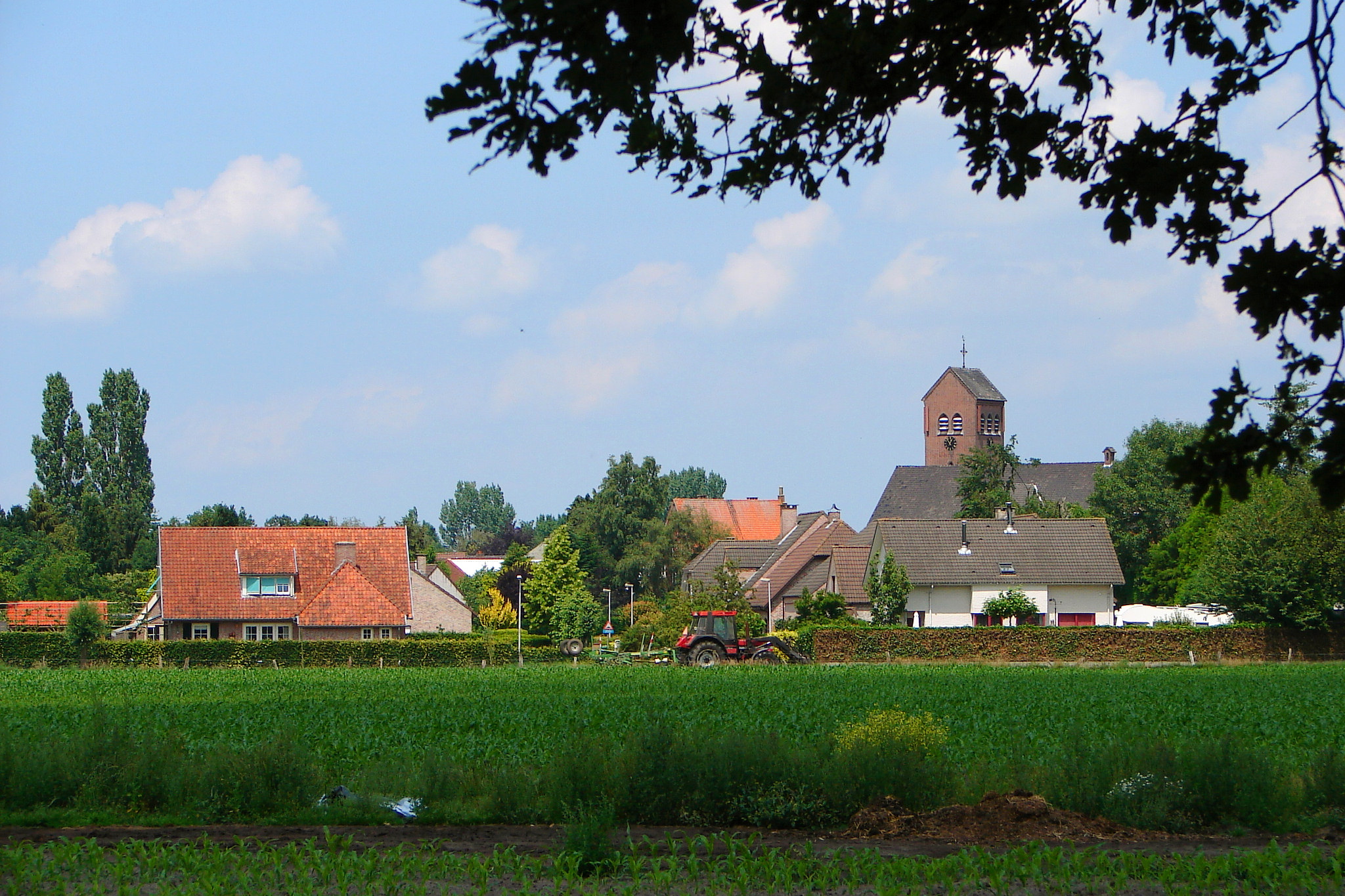
Horendonk

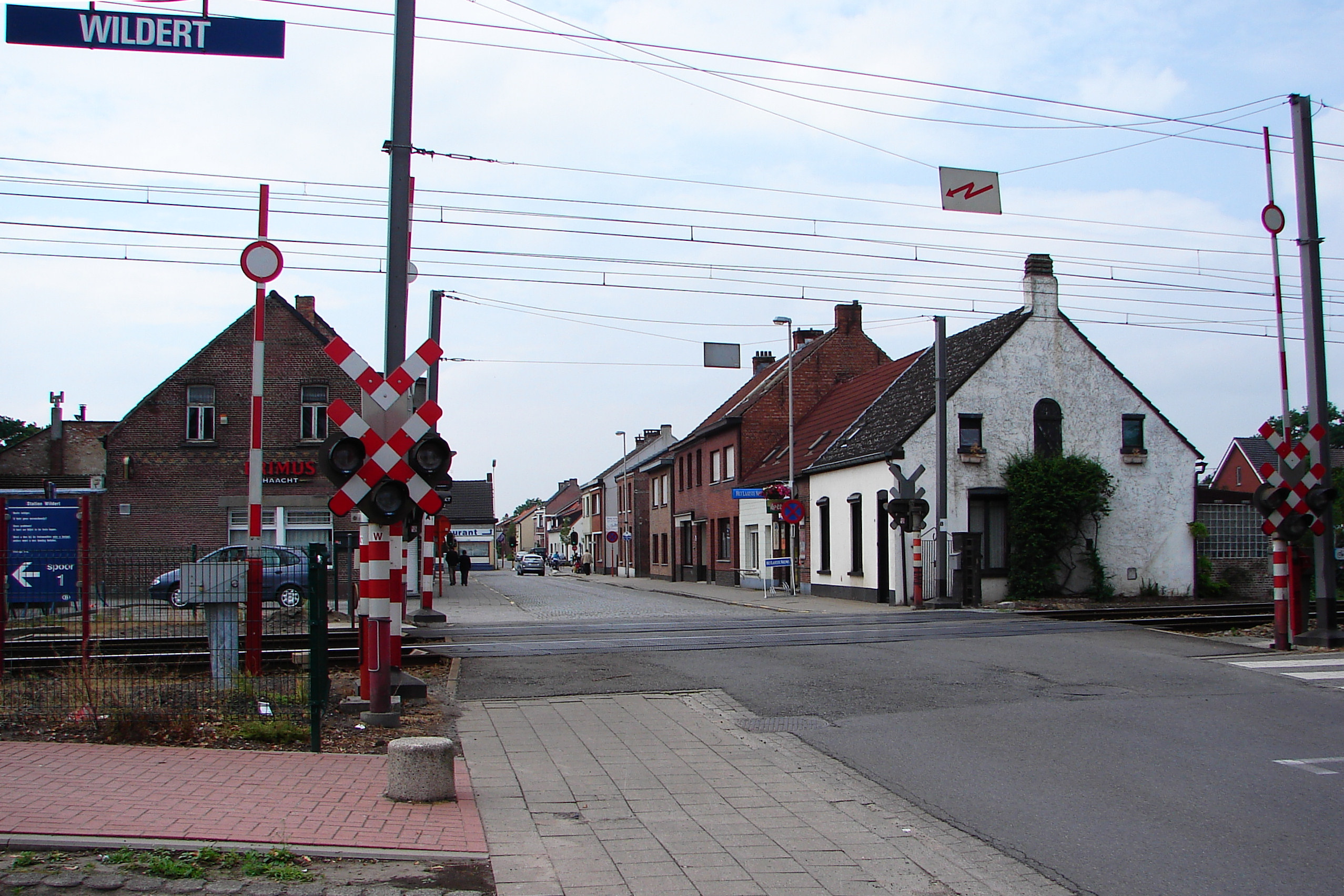
Wildert

Essen is devoid of formal boroughs but has several neighborhoods and hamlets. The village center, known as "Essen-Centre," serves as the heart of the municipality. Adjacent to the west lies the district of Heikant, followed by the rural residential ribbon of Essen-Hoek. Horendonk sits to the east of the center, while Wildert nestles to the south. Statie district resides west of the center.

The 1977 municipal redistribution granted Essen a portion of Kalmthoutse Hoek, which was then integrated into Essen-Hoek.

=== Neighbourhoods ===
Essen is subdivided into two major districts: Essen-Centre and Essen-Statie. These districts are further divided into a tapestry of neighborhoods, including De Heuvel, De Donk, Spijker, Zandstraat, Werf, Bredestraat, Schanker, Schriek, Steenpaal, Vennen, Schildershof, Hemelrijk, Statievelden, and Hondsberg.

=== Hydrography ===
Several streams run through Essen. The longest and best known is probably the Kleine Aa. It flows from the south of the municipality along the east side of the village centre of Wildert to then flow into the north of the municipality along the east side of the village centre of Essen.

- Molenbeek
- Biezebeek
- Papenmoerbeek
- Old Moervaart
- Spillebeek
- Kleine Aa or Wildertse Beek near Wildert.
- Roosendaalse Vaart

=== Climate ===
Climate data for Essen (1991−2020 normals)
| Month | Jan | Feb | Mar | Apr | May | Jun | Jul | Aug | Sep | Oct | Nov | Dec | Year |
|---|---|---|---|---|---|---|---|---|---|---|---|---|---|
| Mean daily maximum °C (°F) | 6.6 (43.9) | 7.6 (45.7) | 11.1 (52.0) | 15.4 (59.7) | 18.9 (66.0) | 21.6 (70.9) | 23.5 (74.3) | 23.4 (74.1) | 20.0 (68.0) | 15.3 (59.5) | 10.3 (50.5) | 7.0 (44.6) | 15.1 (59.2) |
| Daily mean °C (°F) | 3.8 (38.8) | 4.2 (39.6) | 6.9 (44.4) | 10.1 (50.2) | 13.8 (56.8) | 16.6 (61.9) | 18.7 (65.7) | 18.4 (65.1) | 15.2 (59.4) | 11.4 (52.5) | 7.3 (45.1) | 4.4 (39.9) | 10.9 (51.6) |
| Mean daily minimum °C (°F) | 1.1 (34.0) | 0.9 (33.6) | 2.7 (36.9) | 4.9 (40.8) | 8.8 (47.8) | 11.8 (53.2) | 13.8 (56.8) | 13.3 (55.9) | 10.5 (50.9) | 7.4 (45.3) | 4.2 (39.6) | 1.8 (35.2) | 6.8 (44.2) |
| Average precipitation mm (inches) | 75.6 (2.98) | 71.5 (2.81) | 60.7 (2.39) | 46.8 (1.84) | 61.6 (2.43) | 79.4 (3.13) | 93.5 (3.68) | 85.3 (3.36) | 81.3 (3.20) | 81.9 (3.22) | 92.4 (3.64) | 97.9 (3.85) | 927.8 (36.53) |
| Average precipitation days (≥ 1.0 mm) | 13.3 | 12.1 | 10.6 | 9.1 | 9.9 | 10.4 | 11.3 | 11.1 | 10.5 | 11.8 | 13.9 | 14.9 | 138.9 |
| Mean monthly sunshine hours | 64 | 80 | 137 | 193 | 223 | 219 | 224 | 210 | 162 | 117 | 68 | 53 | 1,749 |
Source: Royal Meteorological Institute

== Demographics ==
Historical population

| Year | Pop. | ±% |
|---|---|---|
| 1806 | 1,788 | — |
| 1816 | 1,758 | −1.7% |
| 1831 | 2,044 | +16.3% |
| 1846 | 2,501 | +22.4% |
| 1856 | 2,717 | +8.6% |
| 1866 | 2,974 | +9.5% |
| 1880 | 3,251 | +9.3% |

| Year | Pop. | ±% |
|---|---|---|
| 1890 | 3,970 | +22.1% |
| 1900 | 4,552 | +14.7% |
| 1910 | 6,185 | +35.9% |
| 1920 | 6,525 | +5.5% |
| 1930 | 7,616 | +16.7% |
| 1947 | 8,716 | +14.4% |
| 1961 | 9,850 | +13.0% |

| Year | Pop. | ±% |
|---|---|---|
| 1970 | 11,186 | +13.6% |
| 1981 | 12,505 | +11.8% |
| 1990 | 14,259 | +14.0% |
| 2000 | 16,407 | +15.1% |
| 2010 | 17,797 | +8.5% |
| 2020 | 19,162 | +7.7% |
| 2022 | 19,341 | +0.9% |

Source: NIS, Note:1806 through 1981=population censuses; 1990 and later=population on January 1

As of October 2017, Essen has more than 19,000 residents. Almost one in five Essen citizens has Dutch nationality.

=== Religion ===
Essen is located in the deanery of Noorderkempen in the diocese of Antwerp and has many churches (located in the parishes listed below) including:

- Church of Our Lady of the Nativity in Essen-Centre
- St Anthony of Padua church in Essen-Statie
- St John Baptist church in Wildert
- Verrezen Heerkerk in Heikant
- St Peter's church at Essen-Hoek
- St Vincent de Paul church in Horendonk
- Eucharistic Heart Church, a monastery church at the College of the Eucharistic Heart, this one has been deconsecrated.

== Politics ==
=== Structure ===
The municipality of Essen is part of the electoral district of Brecht, located in the provincial district of Kapellen, the electoral district of Antwerp and finally the electoral district of Antwerp.

| Essen | | Supranational | National | Community | Region | Province | Arrondissement | County District | Canton | Municipality |
|---|---|---|---|---|---|---|---|---|---|---|
| rowspan="3" ! Administrative | Level | European Union | Belgium | Flanders | | Antwerp | Antwerp | | | **Essen** |
| Leadership | European Commission | Belgian government | | Flemish Government | Deputaty | | | | City Council | |
| Council | European Parliament | Chamber ofpeople's representatives | Flemish Parliament | | County Council | | | | Town Council | |
| Select description | | Nederlands Kiescollege | Electoral district Antwerp | | | | Antwerp | Kapellen | Brecht | **Essen** |
| Election | | European | Federal | Flemish | | Provincial Council- | | | | Gemeenteraads- |

=== City Council ===
College of Mayor and Aldermen (2019–2024):

- Mayor: Gaston Van Tichelt (CD&V)
- Aldermen:
  - Dirk Konings (CD&V)
  - Helmut Jaspers (sp.a)
  - Brigitte Quick (CD&V)
  - Arno Aerden (sp.a)
  - Brigitte Van Aert (CD&V)
- President of the City Council: Ludo Somers (CD&V)
- CPAS President: Ludo Somers (CD&V)

=== Previous mayors ===
| Time Period | Mayor |
|---|---|
| ? - 1803 | Lemmens |
| 1803 - ? | Lauwers |
| 1836 - ? | Karel Van Beeck |
| ? - 1866 | Leopold Claessens |
| 1870 - 1883 | Willem Van Loon |
| 1884 - 1896 | Chretien Van Loon |
| 1896 - 1919 | Florimond Buurmans |
| 1919 - 1941 | Jules Kenis |
| 1941 - 1942 | Jan Meeusen (waarnemend burgemeester) |
| 1942 - 1944 | Karel Goovaerts (VNV) |
| 1944 - 1947 | Jules Kenis |
| 1947 - 1965 | Emiel Dierckxsens |
| 1965 - 1995 | Herman Suykerbuyk (CVP) |
| 1996 - 2006 | Frans Schrauwen (CVP / CD&V) |
| 2007 - heden | Gaston Van Tichelt (CD&V) |

Legislature 2001 - 2006

A coalition was formed between CVP and VLD. The mayor was Frans Schrauwen.

Legislature 2007 - 2012

The previous coalition was rejected by the voters. A coalition was made between CD&V and sp.a. The latter party made an explicit condition to end Schrauwen's mandate as mayor.

Legislature 2013 - 2018

The mayor is Gaston Van Tichelt (CD&V). He leads a coalition consisting of CD&V and sp.a. Together they form the majority with 14 out of 25 seats.

Legislature 2019 - 2024

In the municipal elections of October 2018, there were some changes regarding the emerging parties. Open VLD and Piratenpartij did not emerge anymore and some members of Vlaams Belang tore off from their party and these emerged under the name "Essen's Belang".

The cartel party N-VA/PLE became the largest party by two votes over CD&V and the cartel went up 4.7%. As a result, N-VA/PLE gained one more seat than in the previous election and obtained one more seat than CD&V, which lost one seat. CD&V and N-VA/PLE obtained the same percentage of votes, namely 34.7%. sp.a retained its four seats. Vlaams Belang obtained two seats, one more than in the previous election. Essen's Belang did not exceed the electoral threshold.

The previous Roman-red coalition CD&V-sp.a was continued with a majority of 13 to 25 seats and N-VA/PLE ended up in the opposition. Gaston Van Tichelt again became mayor.

=== Results of municipal elections since 1976 ===
| Party or cartel | 10-10-1976 | | 10-10-1982 | | 9-10-1988 | | 9-10-1994 | | 8-10-2000 | | 8-10-2006 | | 14-10-2012 | | 14-10-2018 | |
| Votes / Seats | % | 21 | % | 23 | % | 23 | % | 23 | % | 25 | % | 25 | % | 25 | % | 25 |
|---|---|---|---|---|---|---|---|---|---|---|---|---|---|---|---|---|
| CVP^{1} / CD&V^{2} / CD&V ESSEN^{3} | 80,01^{1} | **18** | 59,32^{1} | **16** | 58,6^{1} | **16** | 44,59^{1} | **12** | 34,66^{1} | **10** | 31,10^{2} | **9** | 34,91^{2} | **10** | 34,7^{3} | **9** |
| SP^{1} / sp.a^{2} / sp.a-JijmaaktEssen^{3} | 19,99^{1} | 3 | 17,81^{1} | 4 | 13,33^{1} | 3 | 18,61^{1} | 4 | 17,32^{1} | 4 | 17,62^{2} | **4** | 17,33^{2} | **4** | 17,8^{3} | **4** |
| PVV^{1} / VLD^{2} / Open Vld^{3} | - | | 6,87^{1} | 0 | 5,74^{1} | 0 | 16,65^{2} | 4 | 20,62^{2} | **6** | 12,64^{2} | 3 | 7,19^{3} | 1 | - | |
| VU^{1} / VU&ID^{2} / N-VA-PLE^{3} | - | | 16^{1} | 3 | 12,47^{1} | 2 | 12,13^{1} | 2 | 10,72^{2} | 2 | 18,28^{3} | 5 | 30,01^{3} | 9 | 34,7^{3} | 10 |
| Vlaams Blok^{1} / Vlaams Belang^{2} | - | | - | | - | | - | | 9,23^{1} | 2 | 12,21^{2} | 3 | 7,85^{2} | 1 | 9,6^{2} | 2 |
| Agalev^{1} / Groen!^{2} | - | | - | | 9,86^{1} | 2 | 6,71^{1} | 1 | 7,45^{1} | 1 | 6,02^{2} | 1 | - | | - | |
| Other ^{(*)} | - | | - | | - | | 1,31 | 0 | - | | 2,13 | 0 | 2,72 | 0 | 3,2 | 0 |
| Total Votes | 7304 | | 8157 | | 8848 | | 9262 | | 10207 | | 10568 | | 10740 | | 11226 | |
| Turnout % | | | | | 94,89 | | 93,94 | | 94,15 | | 94,70 | | 91,26 | | 91,6 | |
| Blank and Void % | 3,93 | | 4,39 | | 3,85 | | 5,72 | | 3,37 | | 2,72 | | 2,44 | | 3,5 | |

The red numbers next to the data indicate the name under which the parties appeared in each election.
The seats of the majority formed are in bold. The largest party is in color.
(*) 1994: PVDA / 2006: Vuurwerk !!! / 2012: Piratenpartij / 2018: Essen's Belang

== Culture ==
=== Music ===
- Kommil Foo

=== Events ===
- Carnival (the largest parade in the Noorderkempen)
- Hoekse Kermis, first weekend in July, with the traditional folk games on Monday.
- Pumpkin Festival with Pumpkin Procession (first Sunday in October)
- Wildert Fun Fair (October)
- Owl Fair (4 days in September, concluded with games)
- Craft Day (last Sunday of August)
- Christmas beer festival with international appeal (mid-December)
- Each youth movement in Essen also has its own annual event.

== Landmarks ==
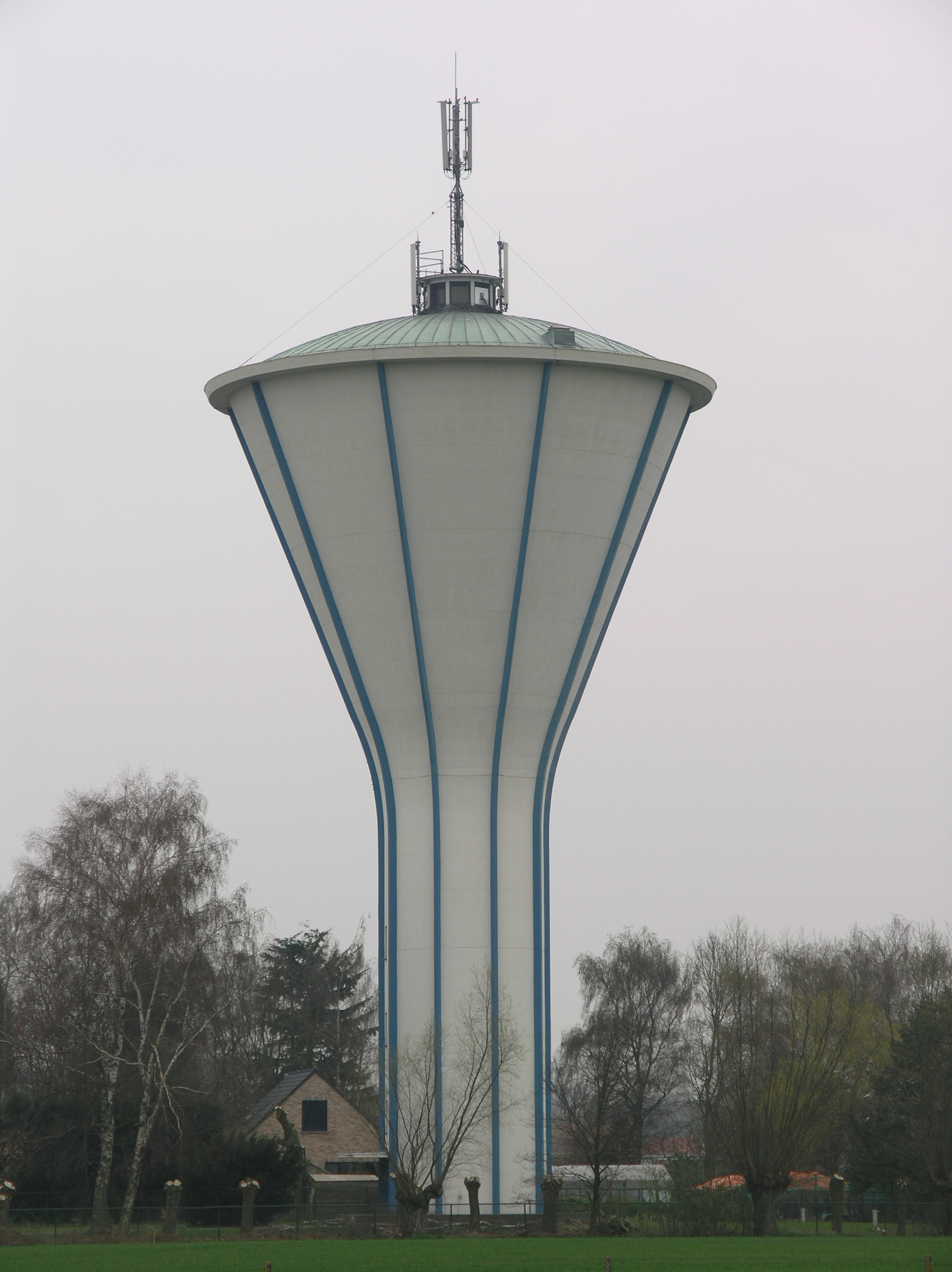
Watertower of Essen

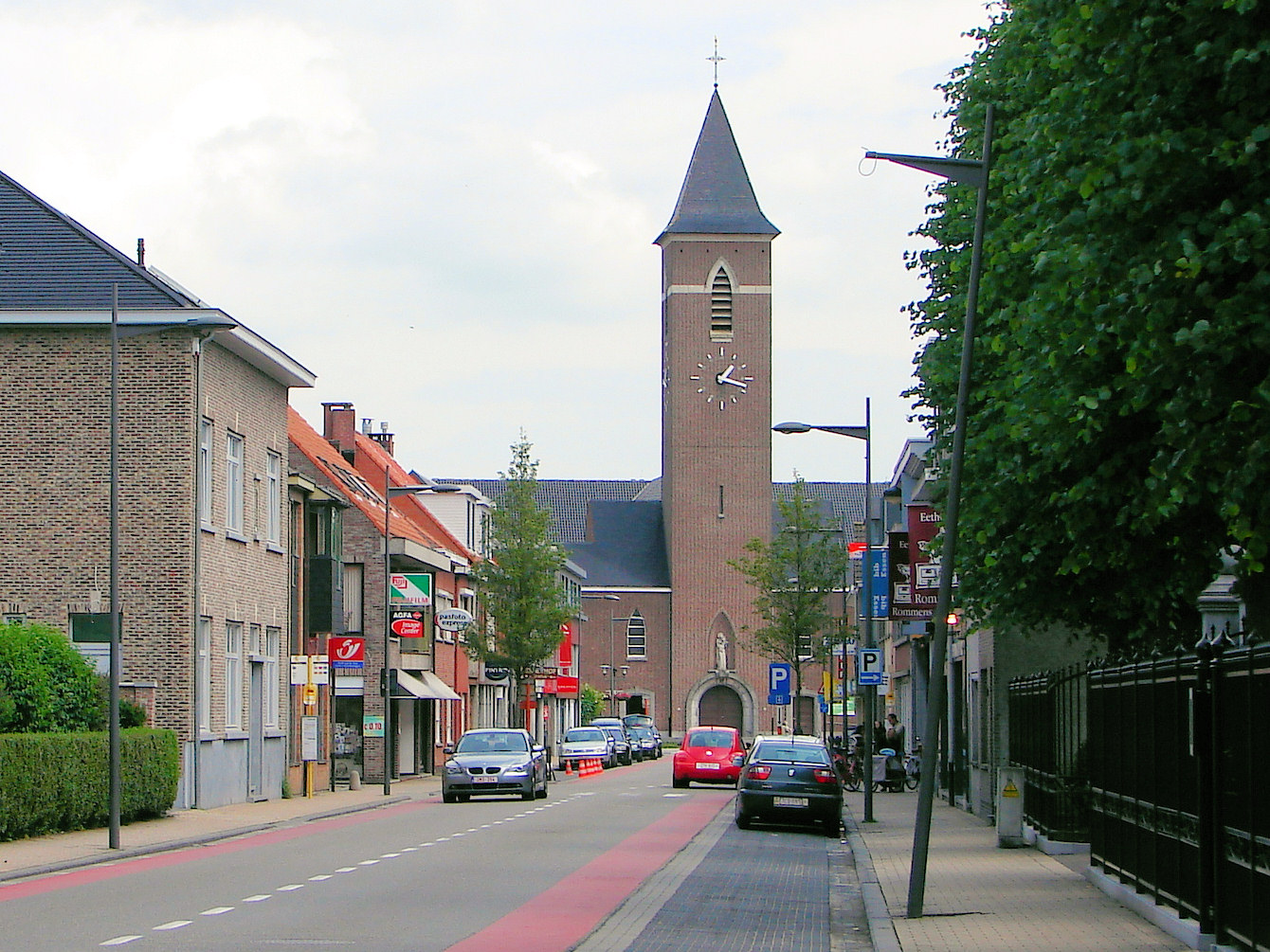
Village view with the Church of Our Lady of the Nativity

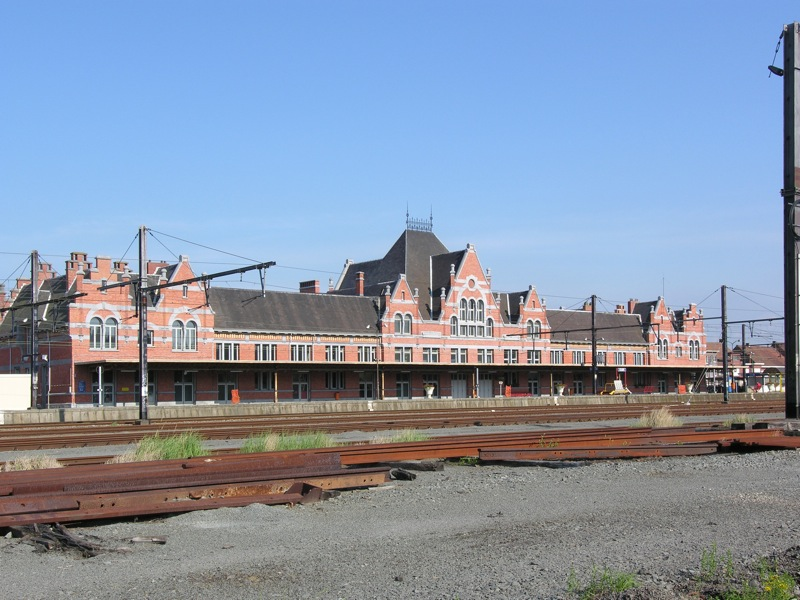
Essen Railway Station

- de Kiekenhoeve, an old farm from 1776 close to the Wheelbarrow museum in the Moerkantsebaan
- the Quarantine Stables where until the 1970s mainly cattle were placed in isolation via a special unloading quay to check the animals for contagious diseases, located in the Hemelrijk
- Essen railway station
- the old SNCB goods shed, close to Essen Railway station
- some mansions in the Nieuwstraat
- the old presbytery, which was the residence of the priests of Essen-Nispen for 500 years. The first mention of the Old Rectory dates back to 1362. It now serves as a cultural centre. Both in 1422 and in 1557 the pastor was murdered there. After its destruction in 1586, it was rebuilt under the leadership of Abbot Piera. His coat of arms was affixed above the door. What remains today is only a quarter of what it once was.
- The Eucharistic Heart Church of the College of the Eucharistic Heart and the school itself, right next to the Father's Garden or Park Fathers Redemptorists in the Rouwmoer. This Redemptorist monastery with church and school was built in 1908 on the site of a former abbey farm: the Rouwmoershoeve. A copper Sacred Heart statue measuring 4.5 m high is placed on top of the church. In the garden there is a Lourdes grotto. Some filming of the television series Salamander took place here.
- The Bakersmill from 1981 in the Sint-Jansstraat in Wildert. This mill is the youngest in Flanders.
- The Mill of Aerden, a windmill remnant
- The St. Anthony of Padua Church by architect Jules Bilmeyer at Sint-Antoniusplein
- The Church of Our Lady of Grace

=== Museums ===
- the Karrenmuseum on Moerkantsebaan
- The Gerard Meeusen museum in the attic of the town hall at Heuvelplein
- The steam museum in the Bakkersmolen in the Sint-Jansstraat
- Robotland, technological do-center next to the station
- 't Kniphof, paper cutting art in Essen-Horendonk

=== Natural areas ===
- The Forest Museum Wildert Dunes
- The Horendonk Woods or Essen Dunes
- The Redemptorist Fathers' Park or the Father's Garden

== Sports ==
In Essen, there are 4 football clubs: Excelsior FC Essen, KFC Olympic Essen, Horendonk FC and KSV Wildert play.

=== Events ===
- The Ronde van Essen, a running race (last full week of August, every day in a different Essen district)
- IKO cyclocross, a ride for the DVV insurance trophy organized at the Hemelrijk

== Transportation ==
=== Road traffic ===
Four national roads run through Essen: the N125, the N117, the N122 and the N133.

=== Public transport ===
The municipality of Essen has two railway stations. There is the border station on line 12 Antwerp - Roosendaal and is served by the L-train Roosendaal - Antwerp-Central and on weekdays also by the IC-train Essen - Brussels-South - Charleroi-South. The village of Wildert also has its own rail station.

From Essen there is a bus line of De Lijn with number 670 to Kapellen and a bus line with number 674 to Stabroek via Wildert.

== Notable people ==
Famous people who were born or lived in Essen:

- Bart Aernouts, cyclocross rider
- Pieter Andriessen, musicologist
- Pam Cornelissen, Dutch politician
- Sachli Gholamalizad, actress and theatre maker
- Jef van Gool (1935–2022), soccer player
- Jan Goossenaerts, from 2010 to 2012, he was the oldest man in Belgium and Europe.
- Rose Gronon, poet
- Ditte Jaspers, actress
- Hubert Lampo, writer
- Ludo Loos, cyclist
- Gustave Magnel, engineer and professor at the University of Ghent
- Tom Meeusen, cyclo-cross rider
- René Melis, journalist and writer
- Paul Pauli, painter and writer
- Michiel Rampaart, actor
- Zdeněk Štybar, cyclo-cross rider
- Herman Suykerbuyk, politician
- Dries van Noten, fashion designer
- Cara Van der Auwera, singer, actress, presenter
- Inga Verhaert, politician
- Mich and Raf Walschaerts, cabaret artist (Kommil Foo)
- Hannes Delcroix, footballer
- Frank Focketyn, actor
- Philip Braat, a Scottish Labour politician

== Partner cities ==
- Essen (Oldenburg) (Germany)
- Šilalė (Lithuania)
- Žilina (Slovakia)
- Hradištko (Czech Republic)
- Witzenberg (South Africa)
- Bolekhiv (Ukraine)
