= Aalstermolen =

Windmill in the Netherlands

- Aalster Mill
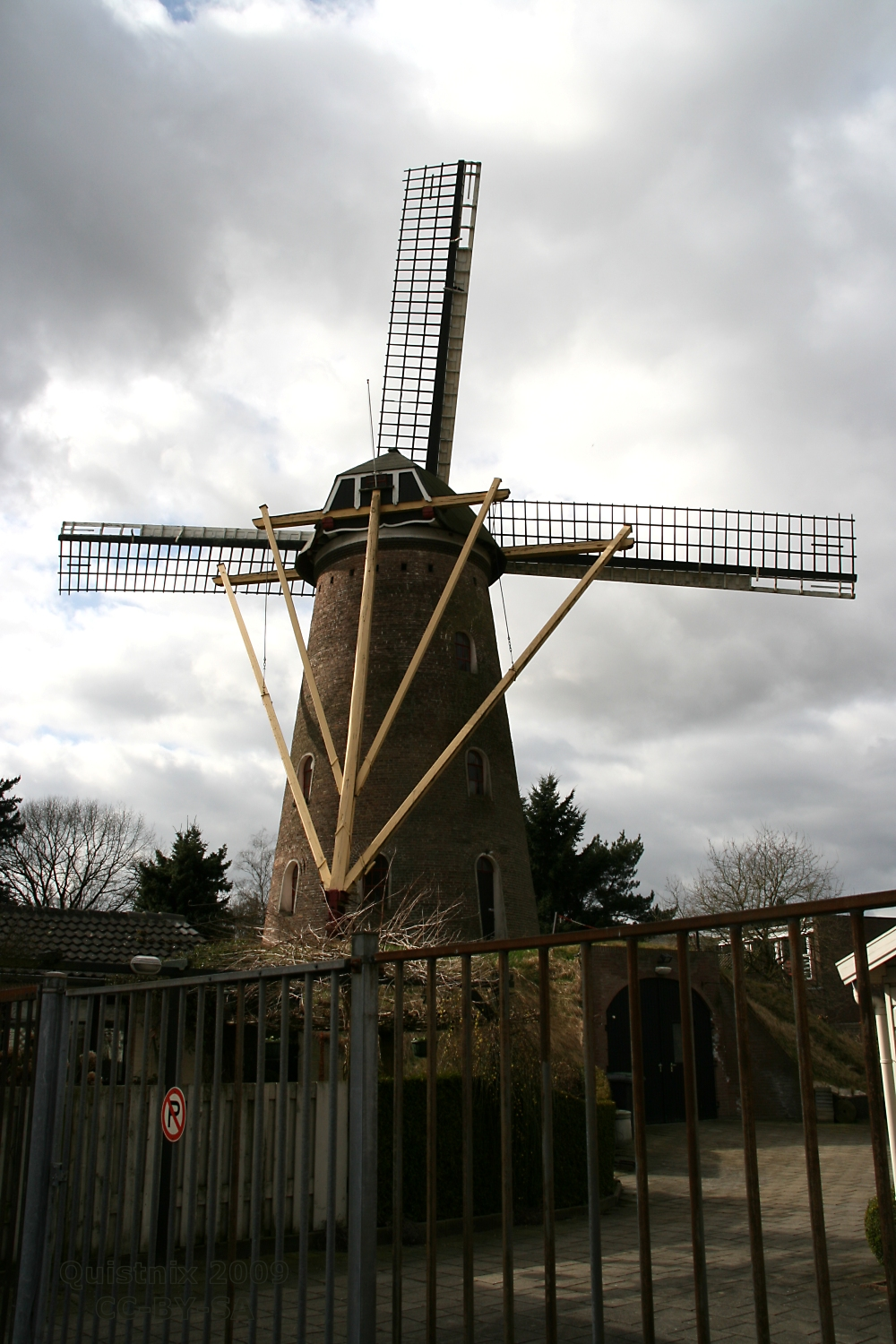
- Aalstermolen in 2009

General information
- Status: Rijksmonument (38186)
- Type: Windmill
- Address: Raadhuisstraat 28A; 5582 JD, Waalre
- Town or city: Waalre
- Country: Netherlands
- Coordinates: 51.396128°N 5.471814°E
- Completed: 1904, 1936
- Designations: Gristmill, currently voluntary

References
- Database of Mills; De Hollandsche Molen

The Aalstermolen (English: Aalster Mill) is a windmill located on the Raadhuisstraat 28A in Aalst, Waalre, in the province of North Brabant, Netherlands. Built in 1904 on an artificial hill, the windmill functioned as gristmill. The mill was built as a tower mill and its sails have a span of 25.70 meters. The mill has been a national monument (nr 38186) since 15 May 1968.

== History ==
Built in 1904, the mill was originally in private ownership until being sold to an investment company in 1934. The mill burned down in 1936 but was immediately rebuilt, using material from a neighbouring mill that was being demolished. In 1955 it was bought by the Van Stekelenburg family. Shortly after it went out of use as a gristmill and the mill came into disrepair. In 1986 the mill was restored, until in 2001 it was once again put out of service.

== Gallery of images ==
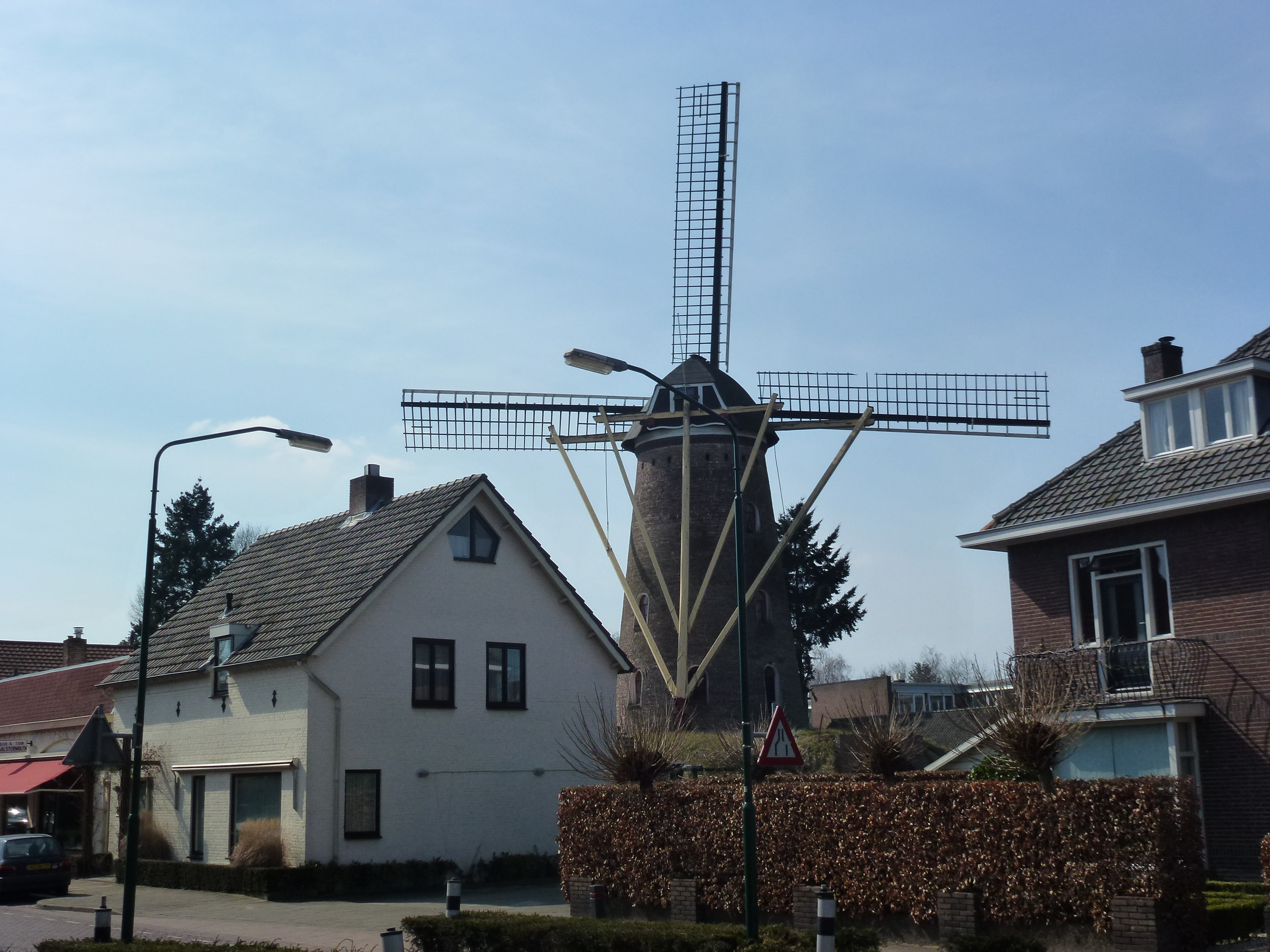
The mill and its surrounding buildings

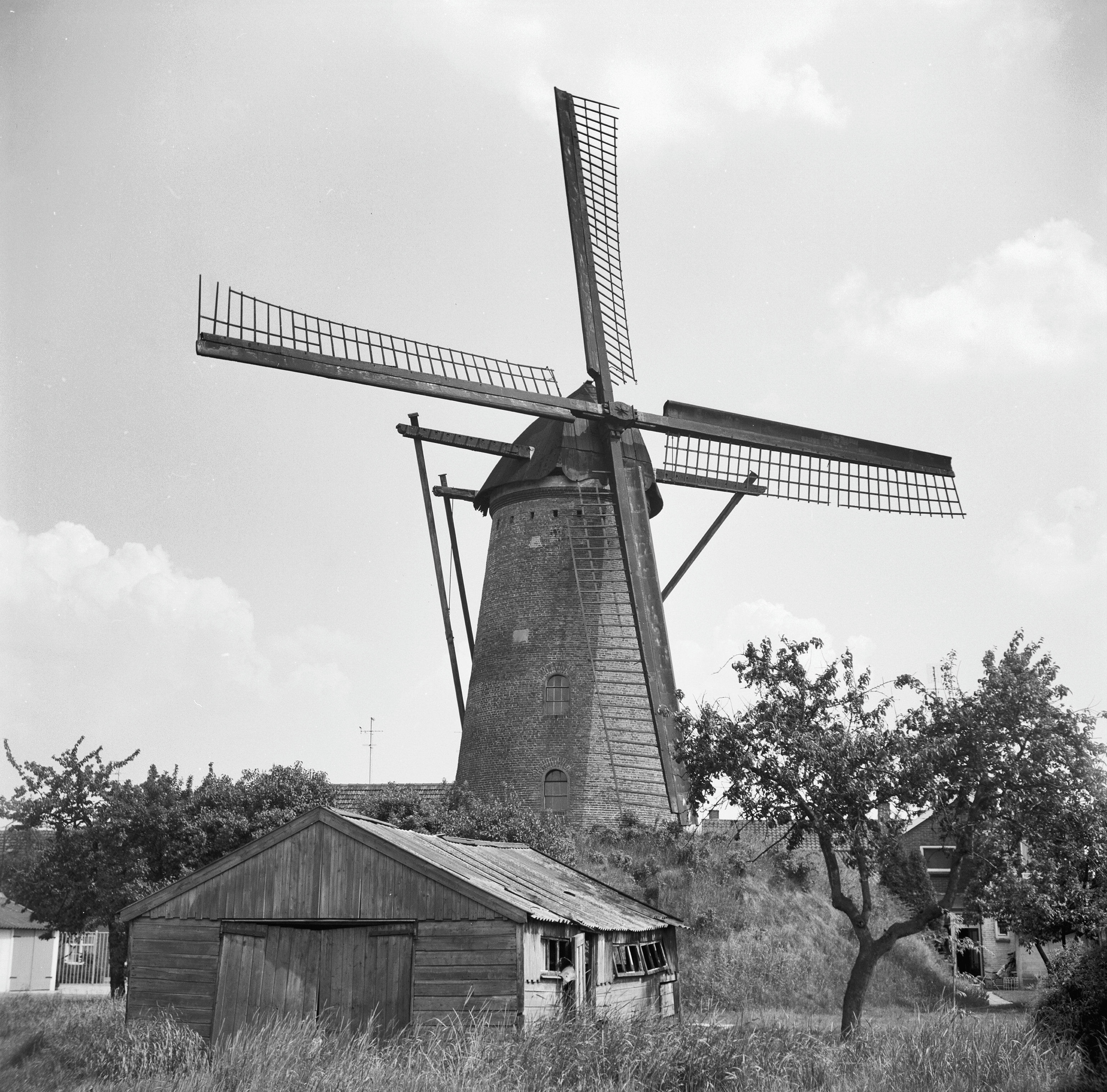
The mill is built on an artificial hill

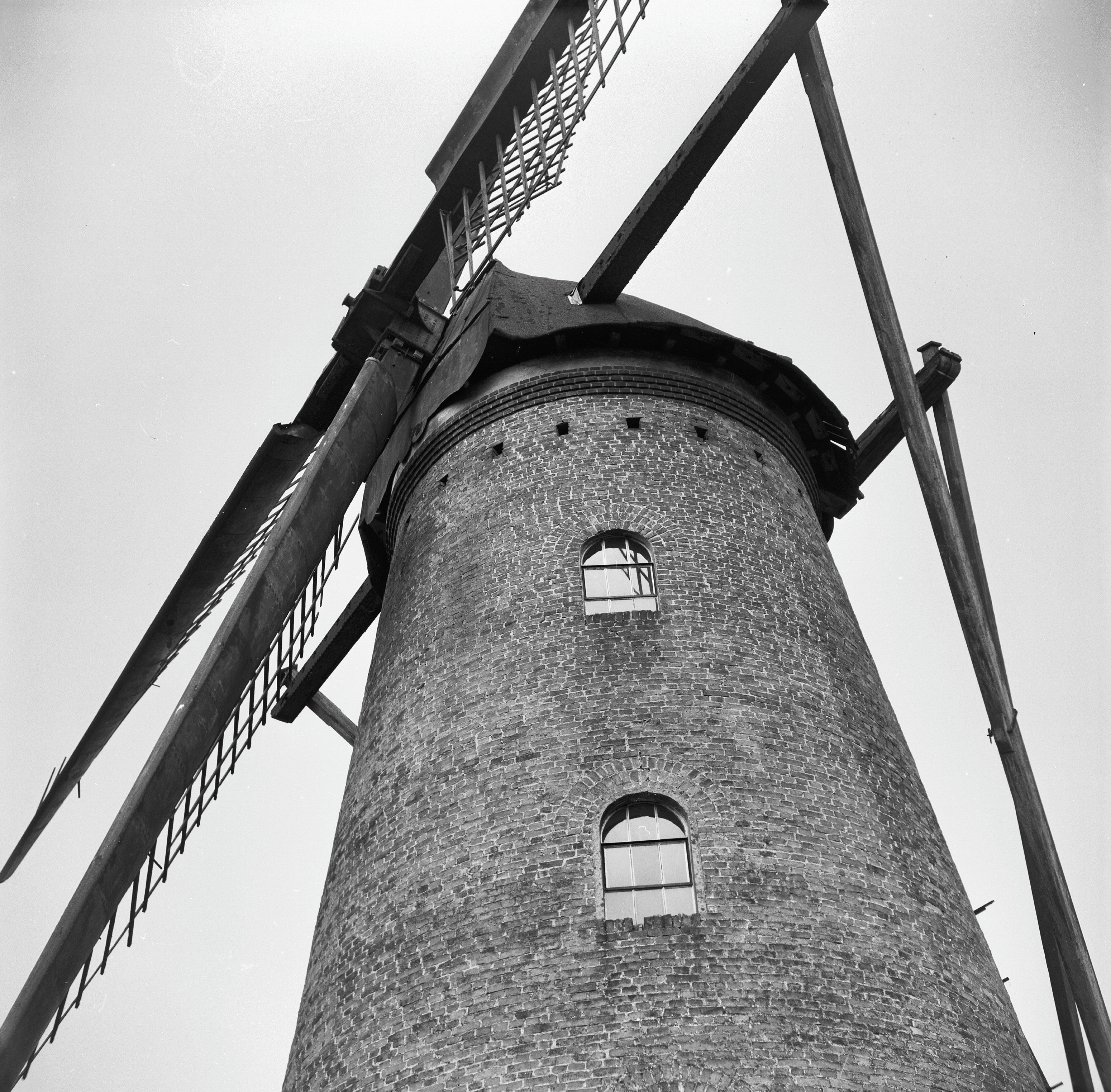
Close-up of the top halve of the mill

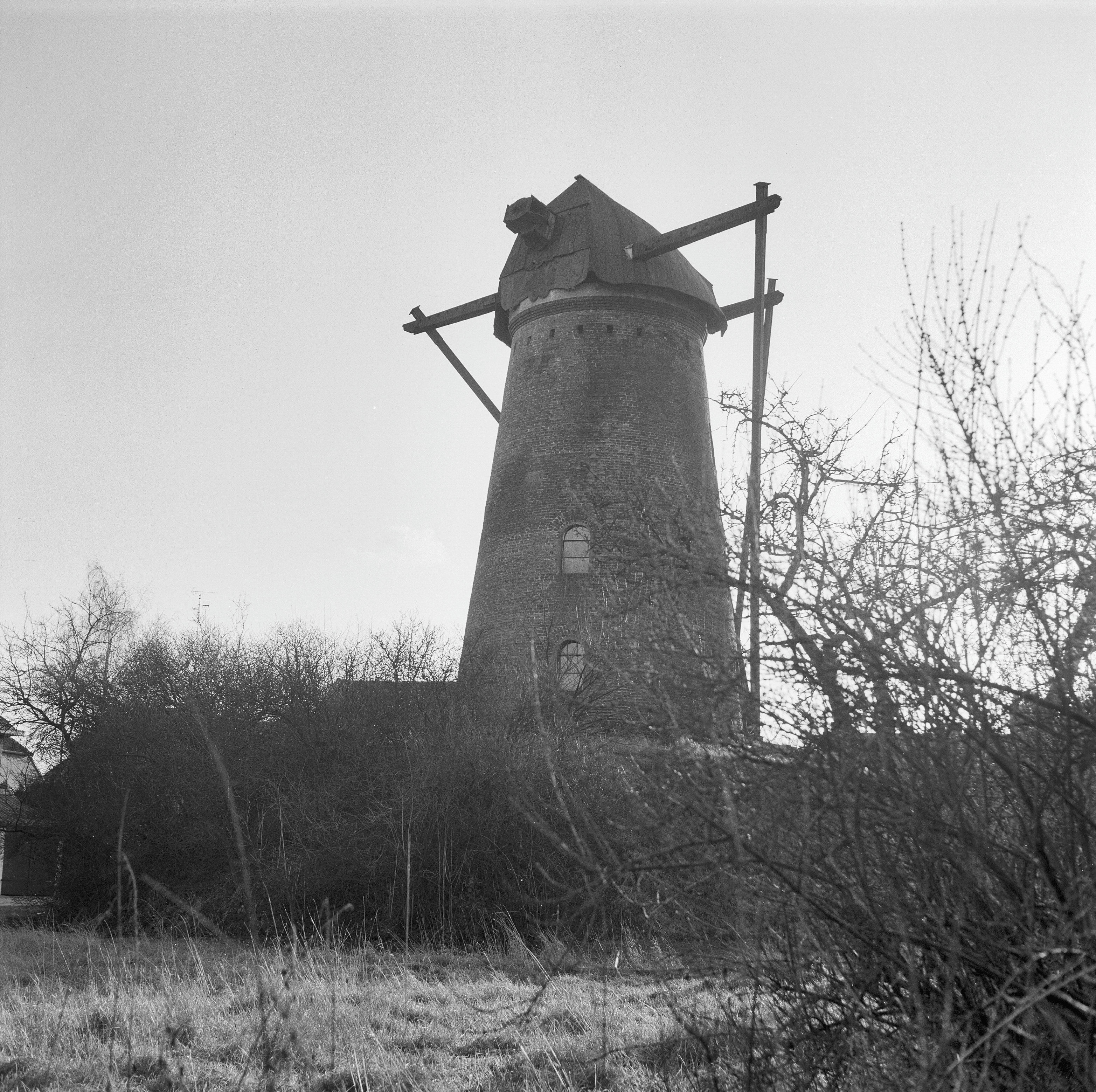
Mill without its sails

== See also ==
Other mills in North Brabant:

- Molen van Aerden, in Nispen, Roosendaal
- Watermill at Opwetten, in Nuenen, Gerwen en Nederwetten
