= Karrenmuseum =

Historical museum in Essen, Belgium

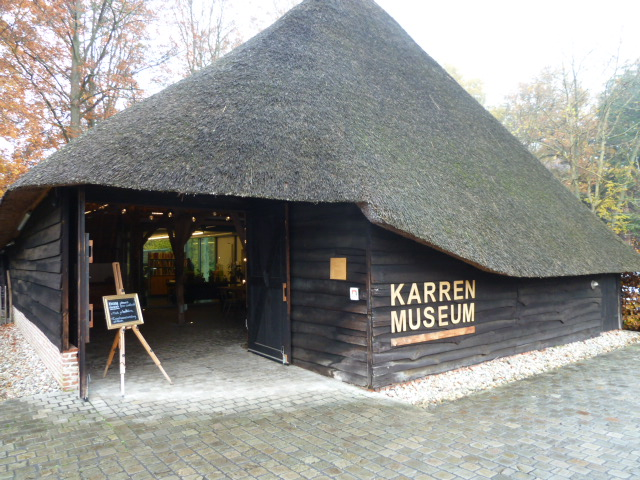
- Entrance of the museum
- Established: 1971
- Location: Moerkantsebaan 52; Essen, Belgium
- Type: Historical Museum
- Website: Karrenmuseum

The Karrenmuseum is an historical museum about carts, wagons, carriages and the making thereof, located in Essen, Belgium.

== History ==
In 1950 Alfons Tireliren, a teacher with a passion for history, started collecting carts, wagons and carriages. He bought a plot of land in Wildert and built a shed to house his collection. Tireliren was chairman of the heritage association of Essen.

Tirelin and the association moved the collection in 1971 to a new location in Essen and started the Karrenmuseum. An 18th-century barn was added in 1976, followed by a smithy and a wheelwright shop in 1979.

The museum was officially recognized in 2006. In 2016 it became a regional museum. The Karrenmuseum celebrated its 50th anniversary in 2021 with the reopening of the carriage house.

== Description ==
The Karrenmuseum is located at the Moerkantsebaan 52 in Essen, Belgium. Its collection of over 300 carts, wagons and carriages is exhibited in open and half-open sheds and in the carriage house. There is a wheelwright shop, a wood shop, a rope shop and a smithy. The museum has its own library, functions as a center of expertise and digitizes its collection.

The museum owns several exceptional pieces such as a traction engine and a horse drawn firefighting apparatus relying on steam for water pressure. The carriage house shelters carriages on loan from the Museum aan de Stroom and IVA Historische Huizen Gent, among others.

== Restoration ==
The museums collection is maintained and restored by volunteers. They train in the various crafts necessary to maintain the collection. Since 2020 some collection pieces are being treated against woodworm biologically and ecologically, using parasitoid wasp. The volunteers also maintain and restore pieces from outside the collection.

== Gallery ==
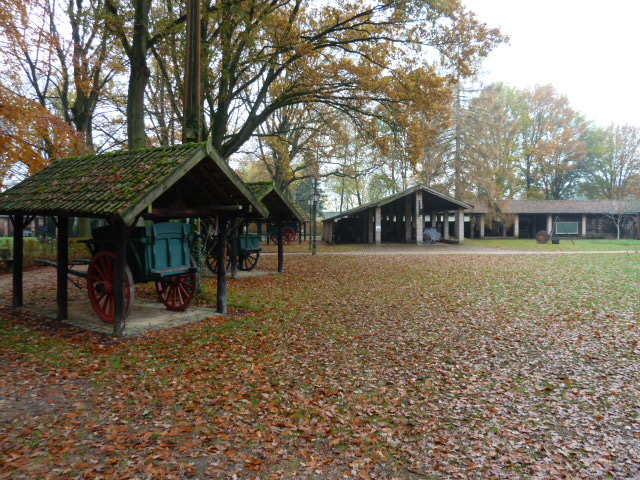
cart

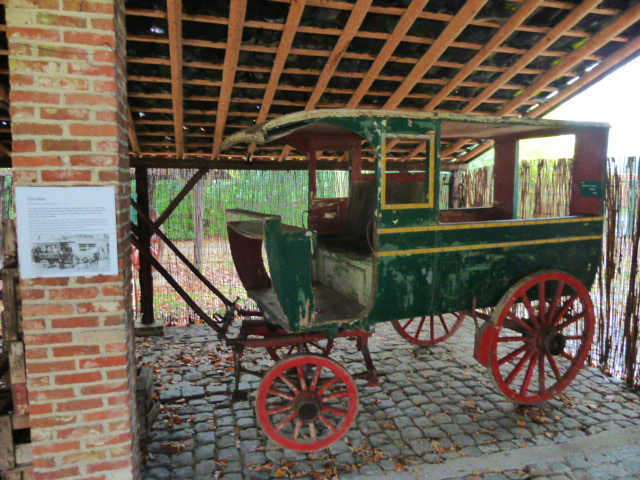
omnibus

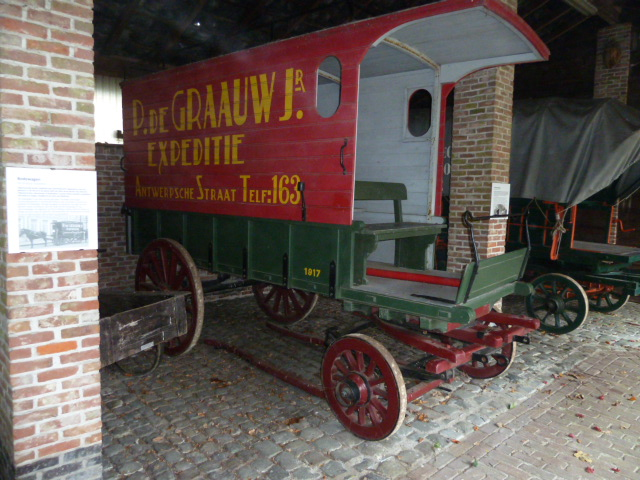
wagon

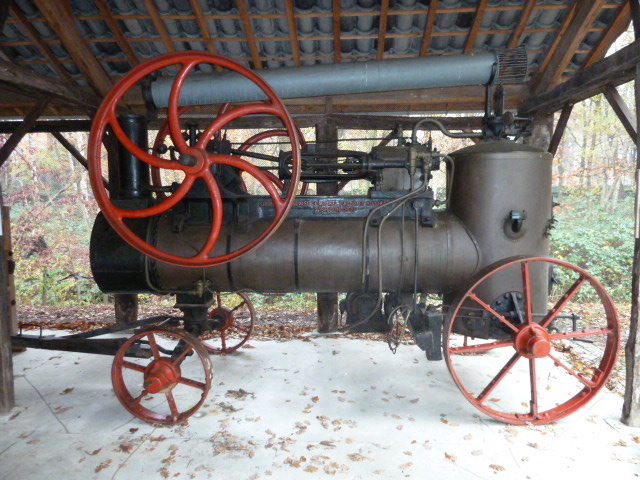
traction engine

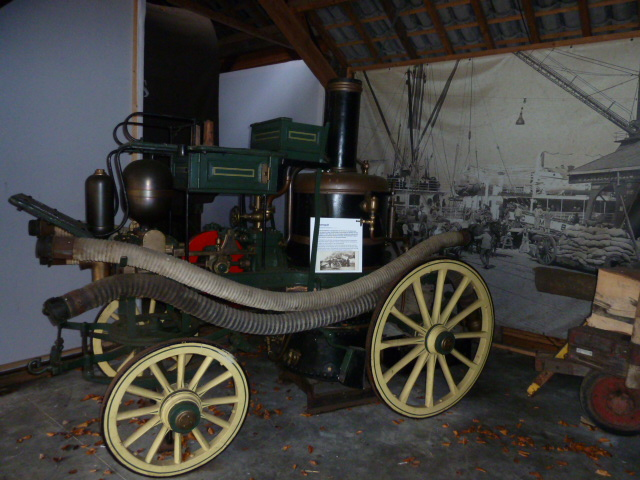
firefighting apparatus

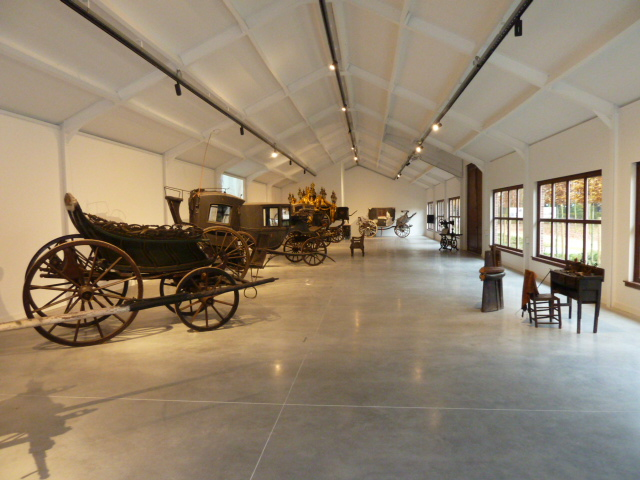
carriage house

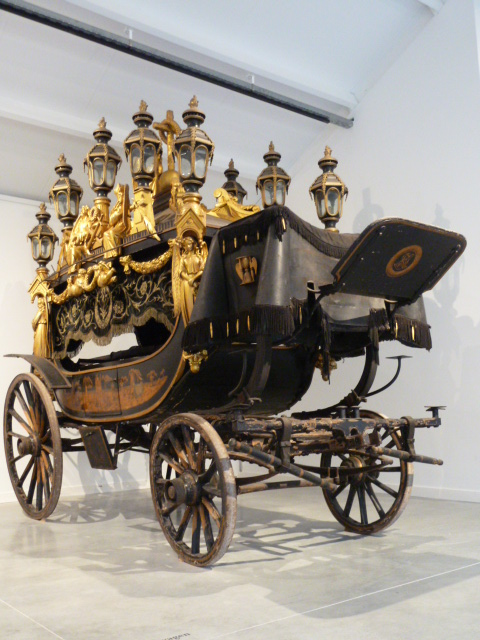
hearse

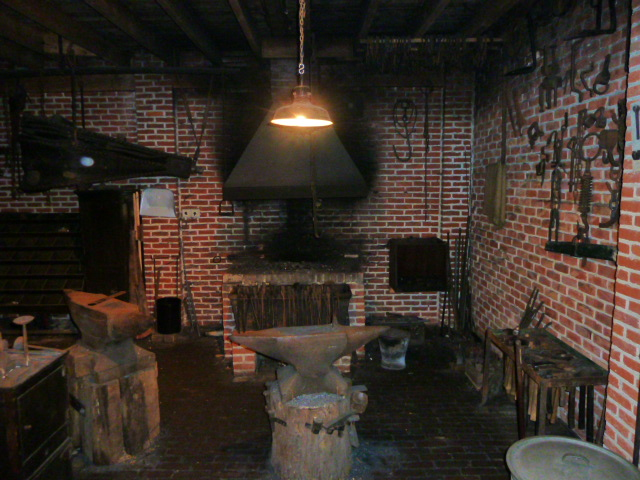
smithy

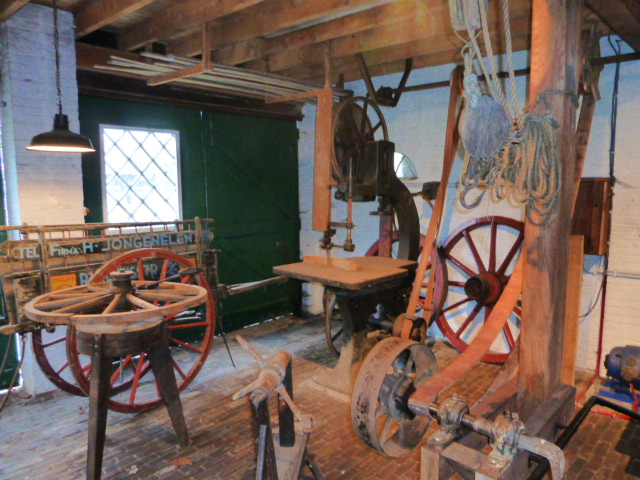
wheelwright shop

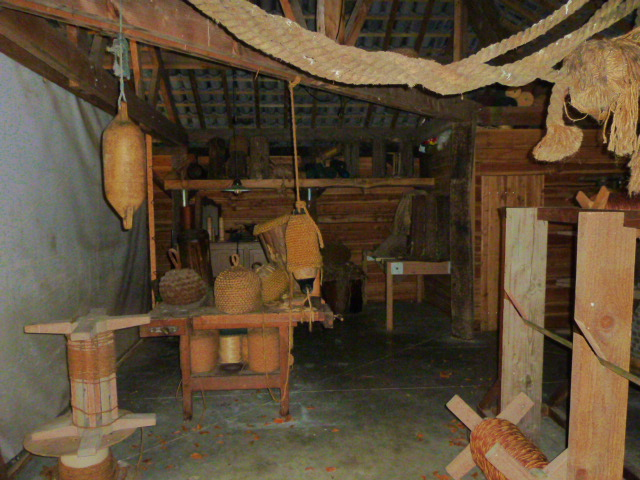
rope shop

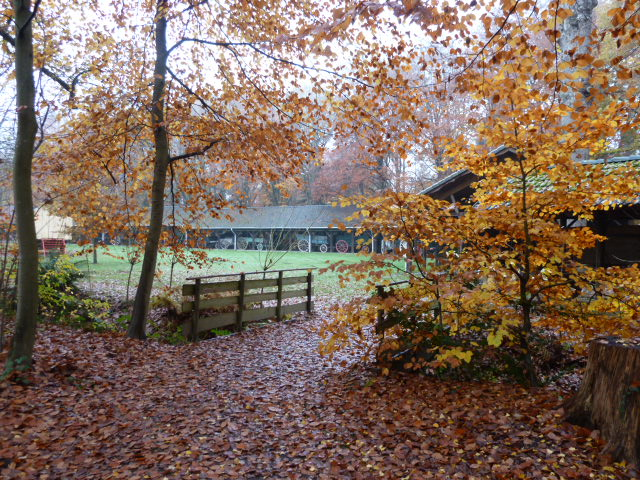

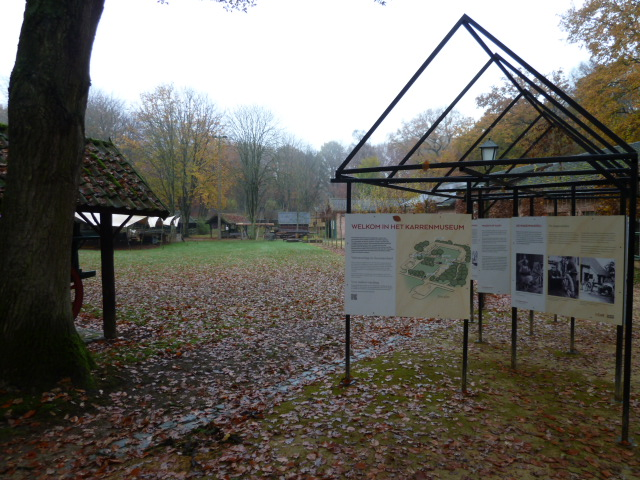

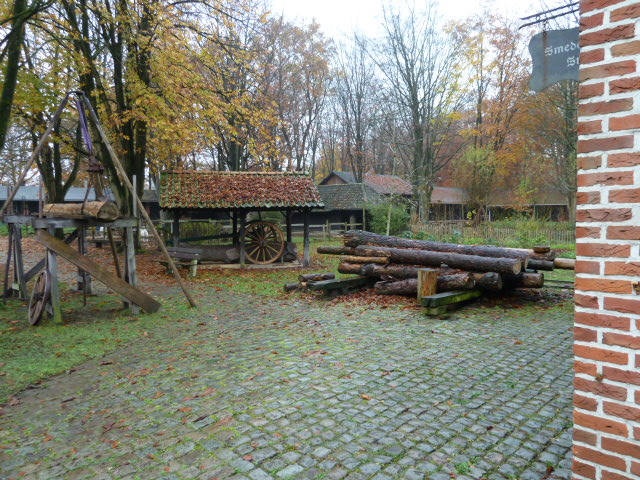

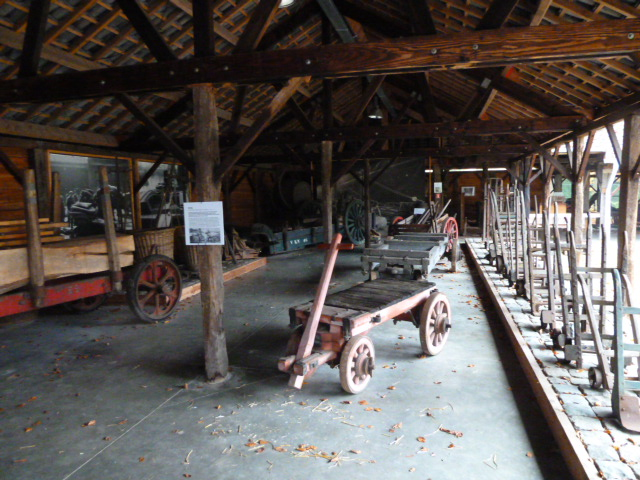
