= Nispen =

- Town
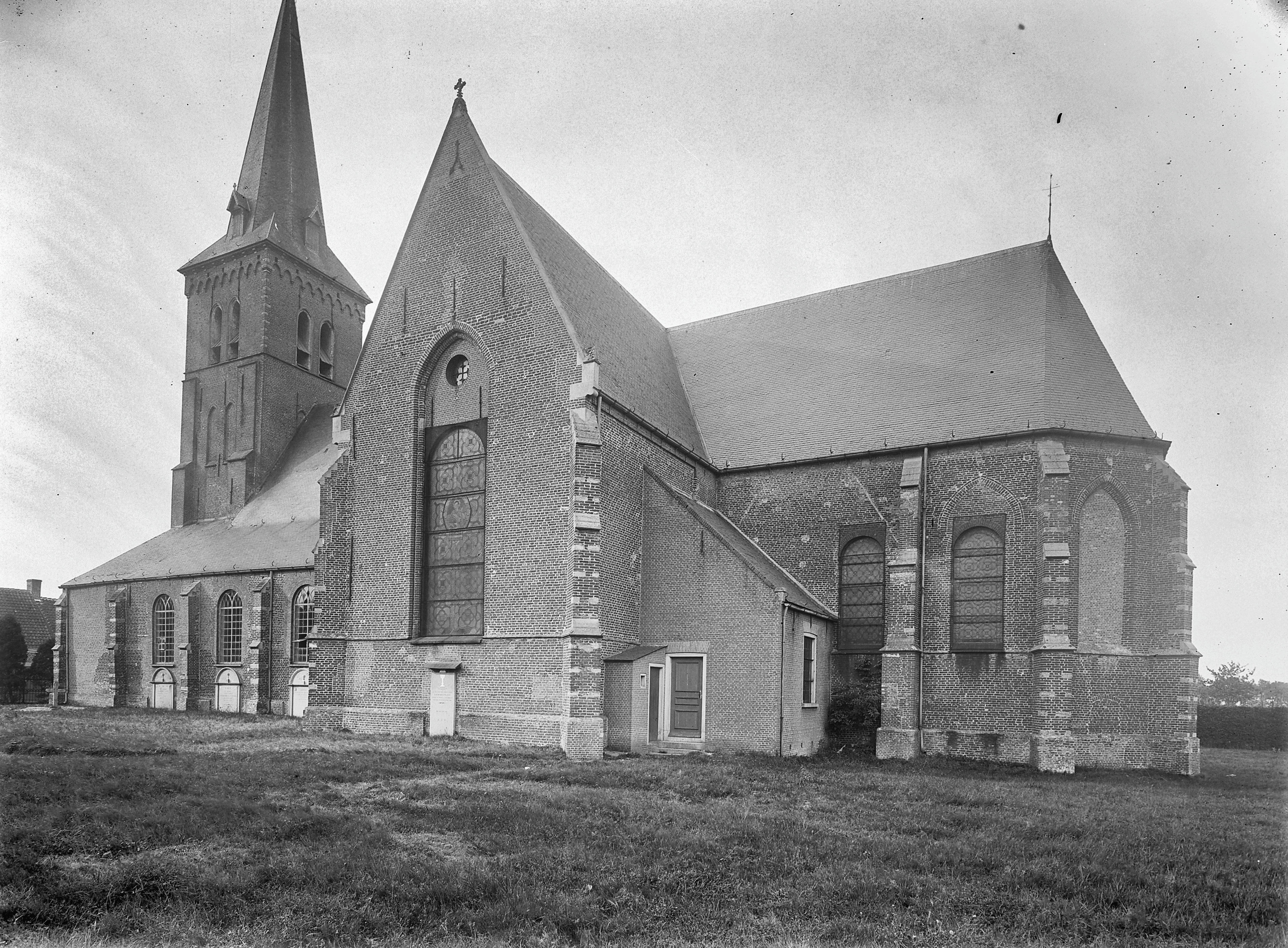
- Former church Maria Hemelvaartkerk

- Coat of arms

- Municipality of Roosendaal in North Brabant

- Location within the Netherlands Location within Europe
- Coordinates: 51°29′2″N 4°27′32″E
- Country: Netherlands
- Province: North Brabant
- Municipality: Roosendaal

Area
  - Total: 1.66 km^{2} (0.64 sq mi)
- Elevation: 10 m (33 ft)

Population (2021)
  - Total: 1,740
  - Density: 1,050/km^{2} (2,710/sq mi)
- Time zone: UTC+1 (CET)
  - Summer (DST): UTC+2 (CEST)
- Postal code: 4709
- Dialing code: 0165

Nispen (Brabantian dialect: Nipse) is a town in the Dutch province of North Brabant. It is part of the municipality of Roosendaal, formerly the municipality of Roosendaal en Nispen.

Nispen is located in the valley of the river Kleine Aa. First mentioned in 1157, the village was the centre of a large parish. Surrounding villages separated over time, and Nispen soon was overshadowed by its neighbouring village of Roosendaal, becoming an administrative part of Roosendaal in the early 14th century. Gaining some wealth by the trade in turf, the village was destroyed during the Eighty Years' War. Following the Peace of Münster Nispen has been on both the national and religious borders between Protestant Netherlands and Catholic Belgium. The stream Bansloot between Nispen and the Belgian village of Essen forming the border.

== Etymology ==
Nispen is derived from the name Nisipa. It was first the name of the Kleine Aa river, and would later become the name of the village. It is assumed that apa is of German or Celtic origin, meaning water or river. And nes meaning watery land.

== History ==
=== Earliest human activity, first settlements ===
Earliest human activity around Nispen, as shown by a stone tool, dates from around 7,000 BCE. At Essenseweg-Rozenakker traces were found of a farm dating from around 700-12 BCE. At Rozenakker remains are located of a Roman farm dated around the year 150 CE. It was a large farm of around 30 by 7 meters. Other Roman remains were found in the church garden. There is evidence of a town existing on the location of Nispen since at least around the year 800–1000.

=== Middle Ages and Eighty Years War ===
The first mention of the name Nisipa dates from a certificate from 1157 in which Henry II of Leez, prince-bishops of Liège, confirmed gifts made by Arnulf and his son Arnulf II to Tongerlo Abbey which had the right of patronage of the parish of Nispen. Until 1287 Nispen was part of the eninge van Wouw, a college of schepenen. In 1287 Nispen became part of the Baronie van Breda. From the early 14th century Nispen had 2 schepen in the college of Roosendaal. Between 1525 and 1610 a channel was dug from Essen to Roosendaal to facilitate the trade in turf. A castle existed in Nispen called Castle Moerendaal, which was destroyed in the early 17th century. Around 1650 Nispen was described as a church, school and 28 houses.

=== French occupation, United Netherlands, Belgian revolt ===
In 1794 invading French troops burned and damaged the school building. In 1797 the Catholics were once again allowed to use part of the church in Nispen, sharing the church with the small group of Dutch Reformed Protestants. In 1802 the neighbouring Essen became its own parish. Priests were provided by the Tongerlo Abbey until 1822. In 1823 Nispen was described as a church, church parish building, school and 34 houses. In 1828 the entire church building once again became Catholic. Following the French annexation of the Kingdom of Holland in 1810 Nispen and Essen once again belonged to the same country, which they remained under the United Kingdom of the Netherlands. After the Belgian Revolution the stream Bansloot between Nispen and the Belgian village of Essen formed the border.

=== 19th century ===
In 1809 and 1850 requests were made to become independent of Roosendaal, though to no avail. In 1850 the windmill Molen van Aerden was built, which exists to this day. On 26 June 1854 a railroad was opened between Antwerp and Roosendaal. Even though Nispen was located on the border, no station was ever built.

=== 20th century ===
After World War I Franciscan sisters from Roosendaal started the Saint Antonius monastery in Nispen with an attached girls school. A catholic boys school followed called the saint Donatusschool. In 1930 the road between Roosendaal and Essen was changed from bricks to concrete. that same year the church was demolished and rebuild, following a design by Jos Cuypers, keeping the old church tower.

During World War II Nispen suffered German bombardments as it was located near a railroad. 3 villagers died during May 1940. During the war the Church bells were melted down by the Germans and the church tower was blown up during the German retreat. Canadian and English forces liberated the village in October 1944. Most houses were damaged during the liberation. In memory of the 22 villagers who died during the war the Peace Chapel (Dutch: Vredeskapel) was built in 1946. In 1957 the village celebrated 1000 years Nispen.

=== 21st century ===
In 2001 the H. Maria Hemelvaart parish ceased being an independent parish.

== Natural reserve ==
Between Roosendaal and Nispen lies the natural reserve of Molenbeek Valley (Dutch: Dal van de Molenbeek), which is owned by Staatsbosbeheer.

== Gallery ==
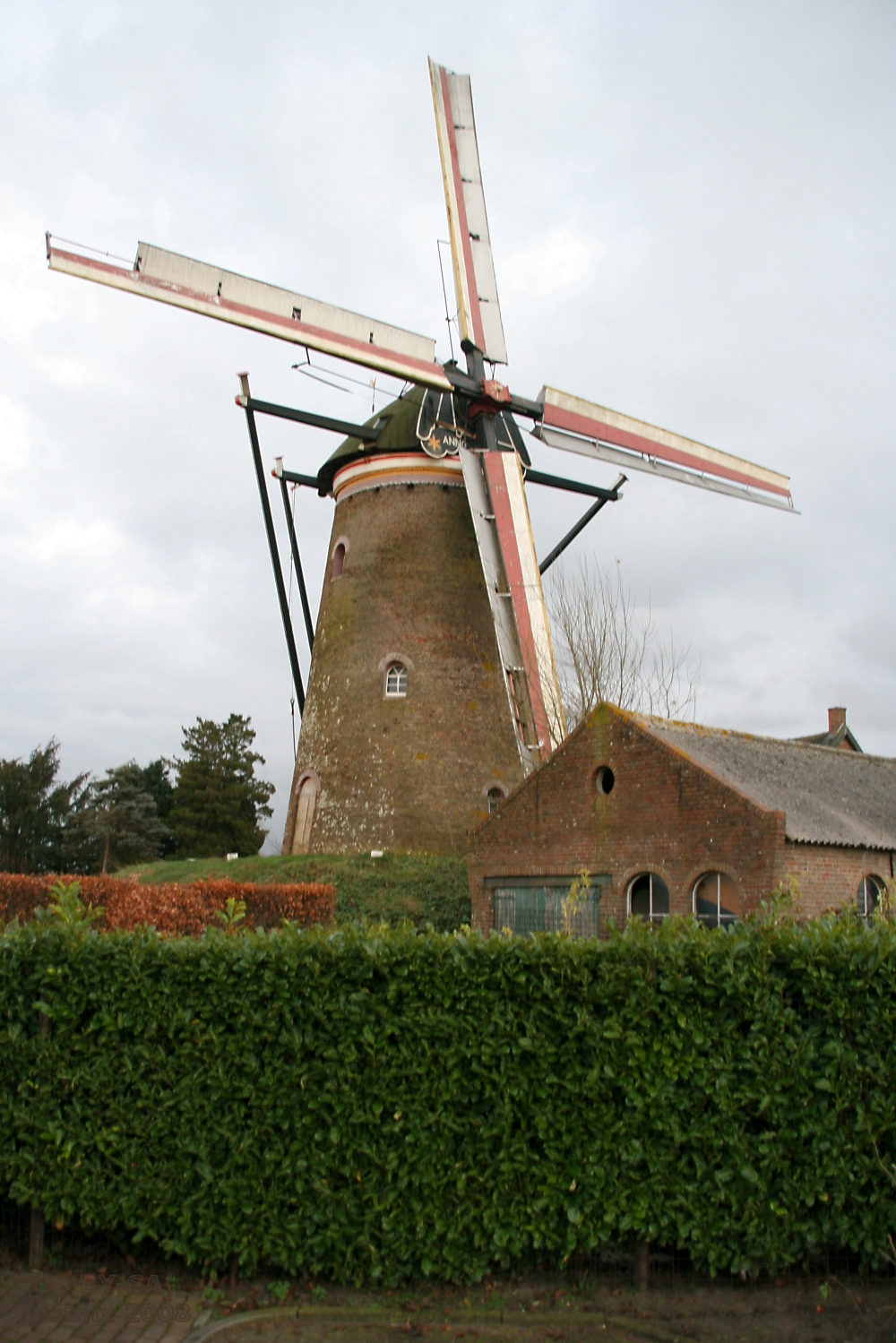
Monumental windmill built in 1850

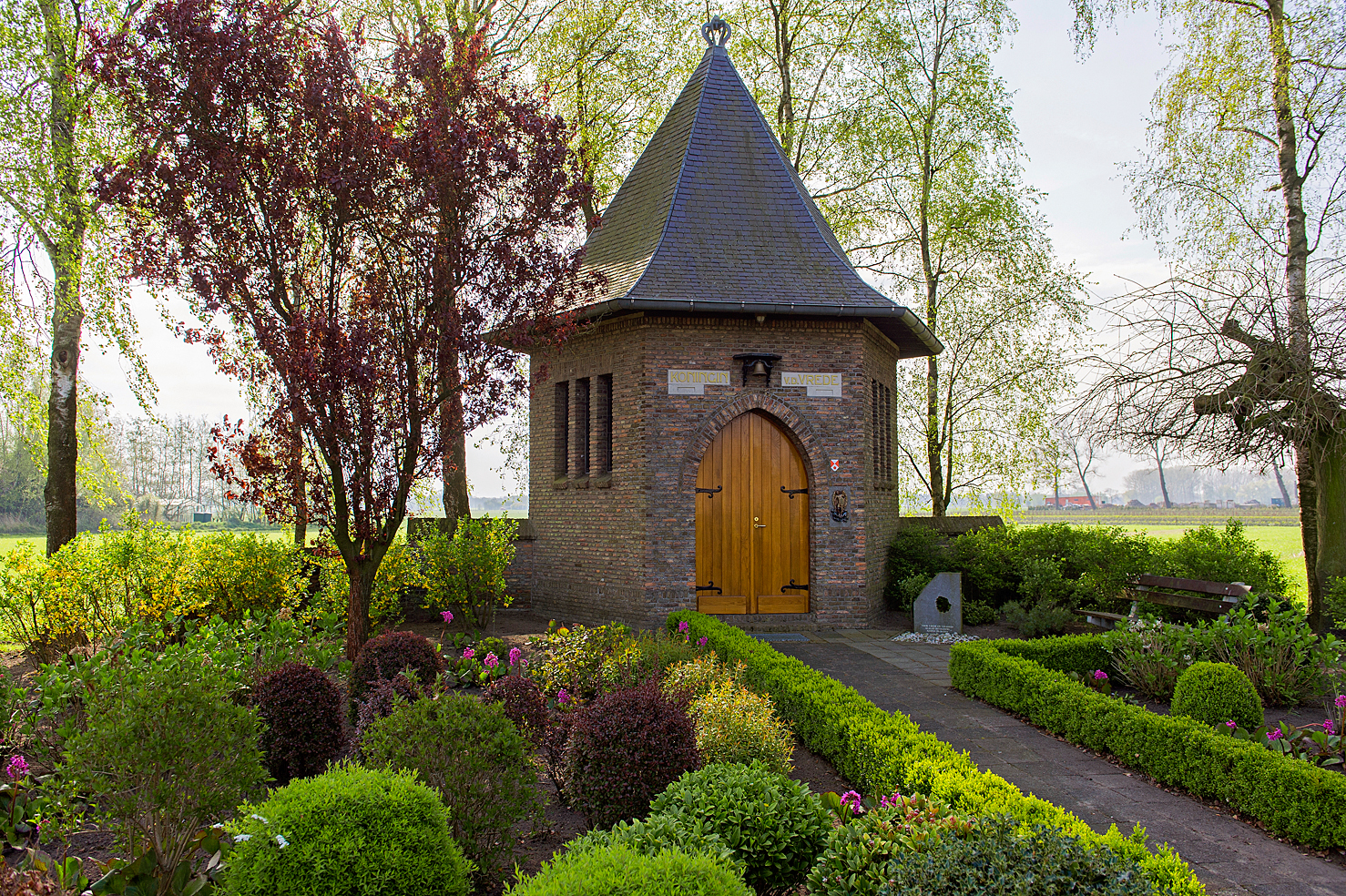
Peace Chapel built in 1946

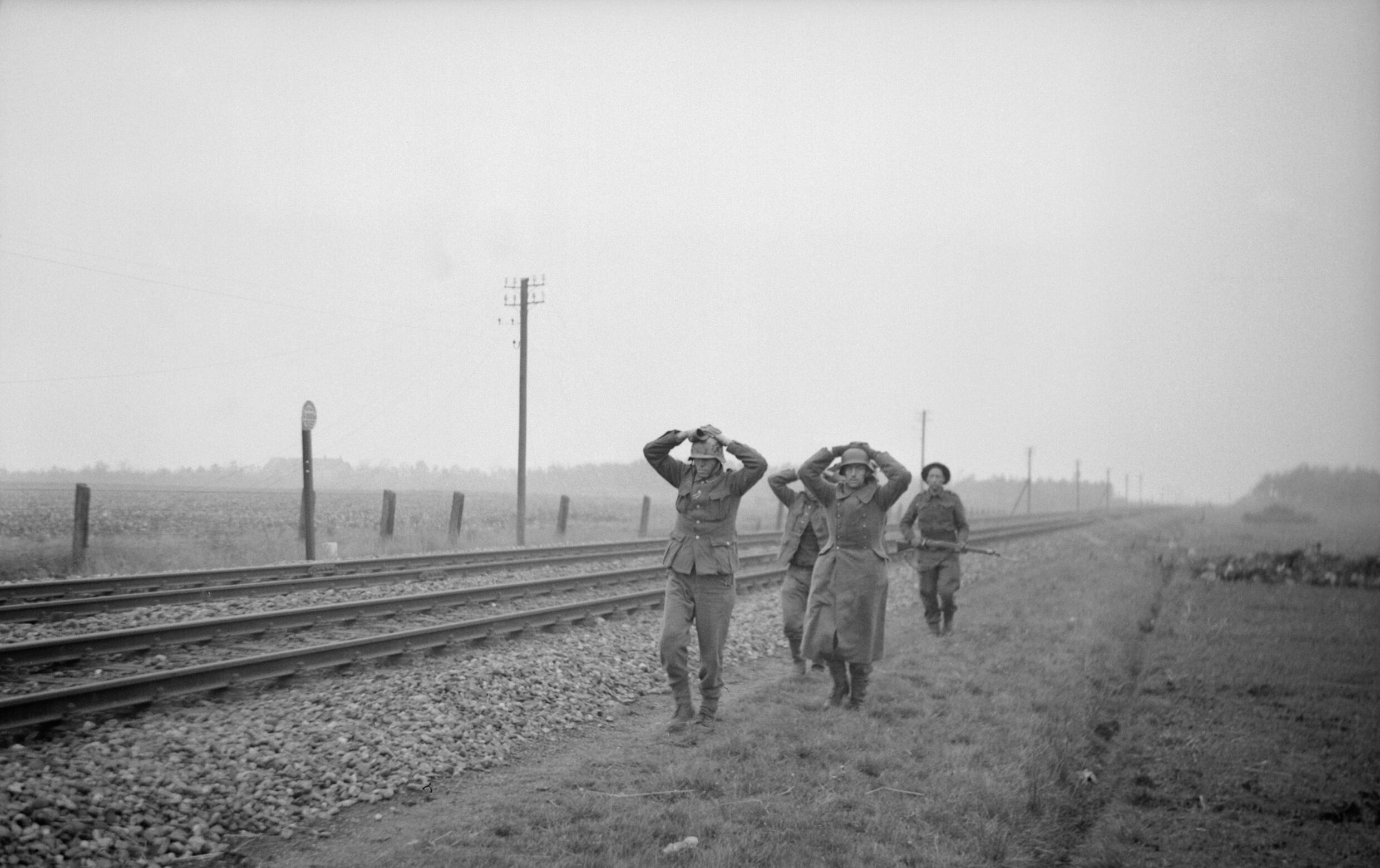
German prisoners in 1944

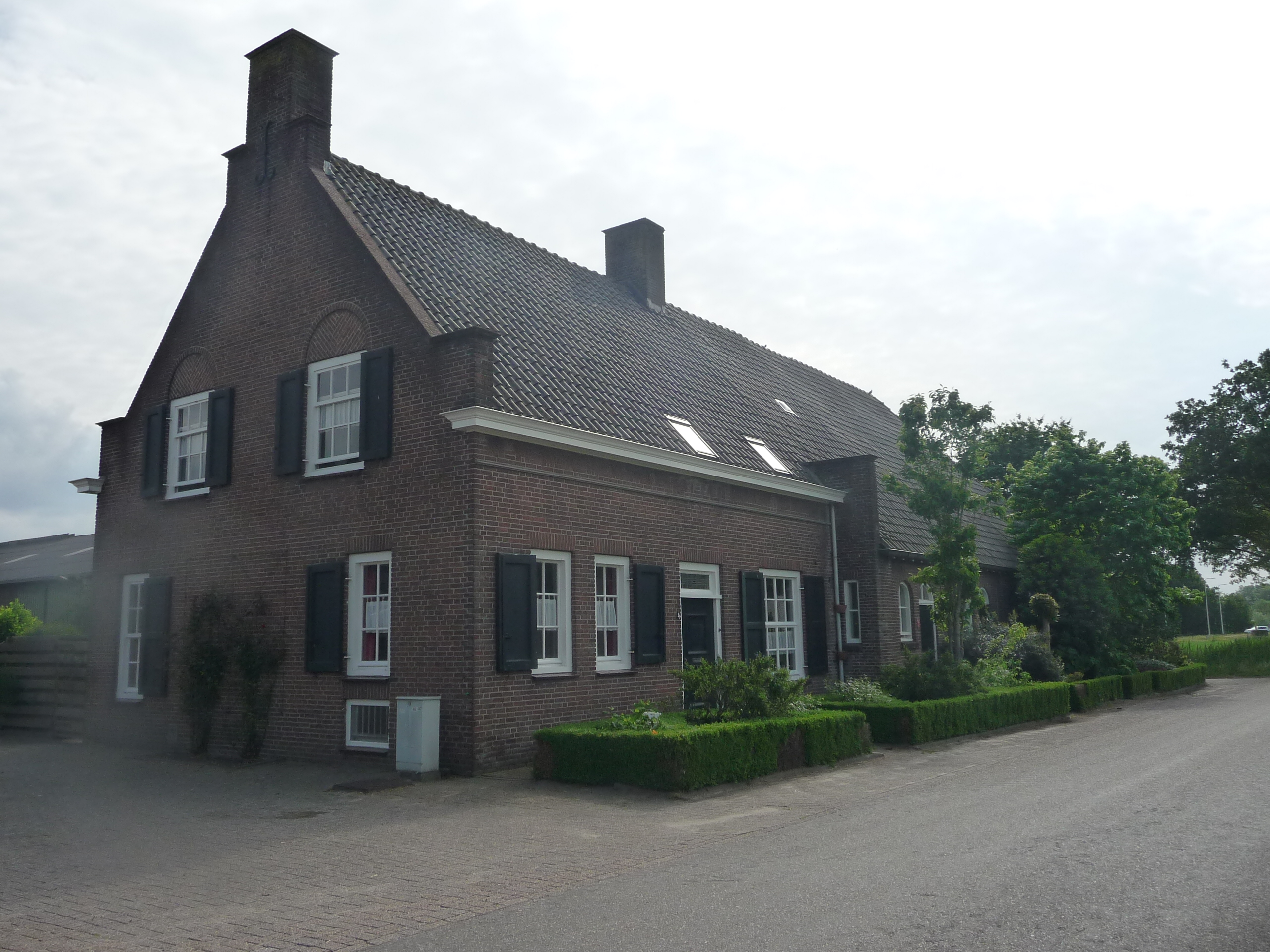
Monumental farm at Zonnelandstraat 4

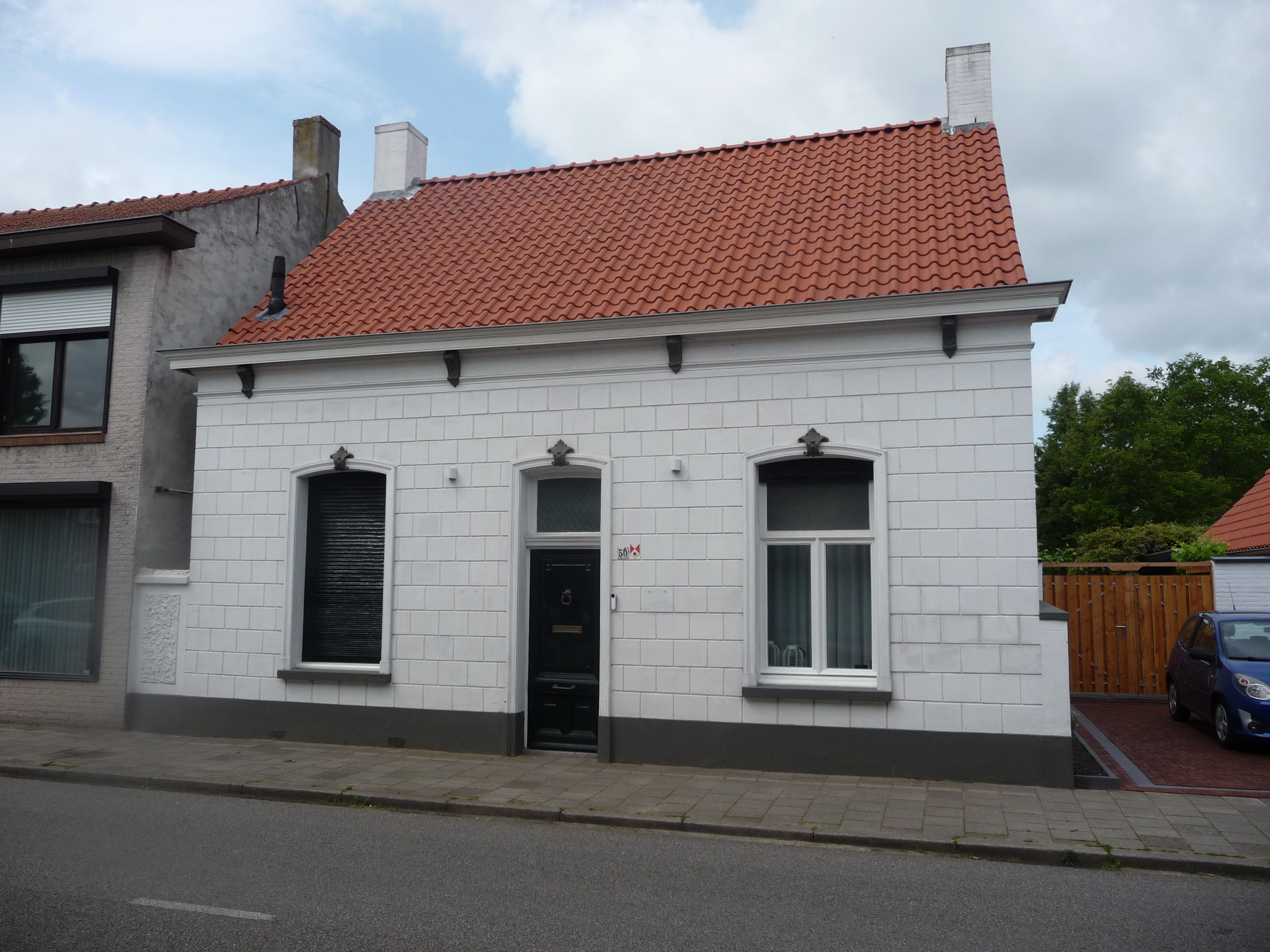
Monumental house at Dorpsstraat 50

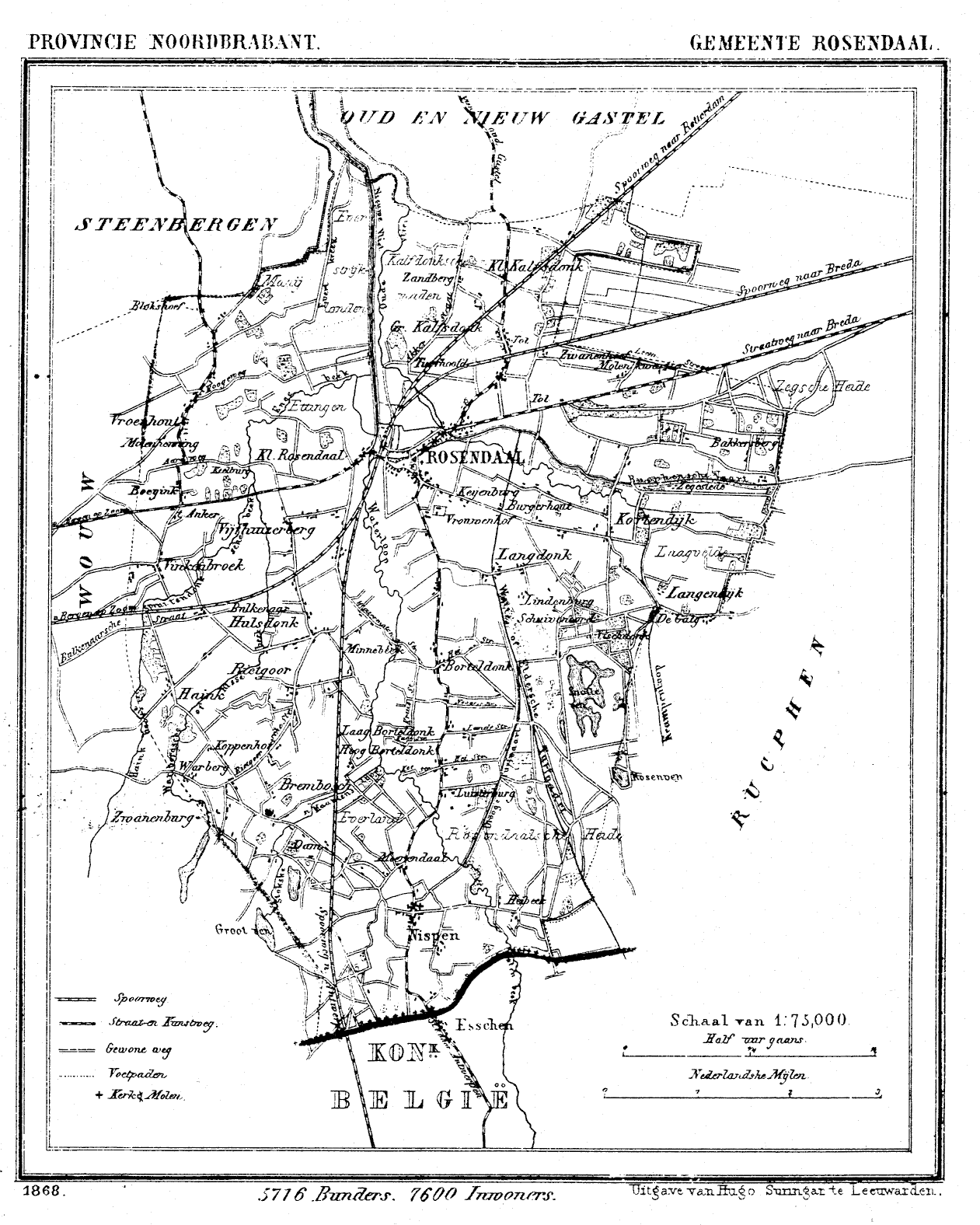
Roosendaal and Nispen in 1868

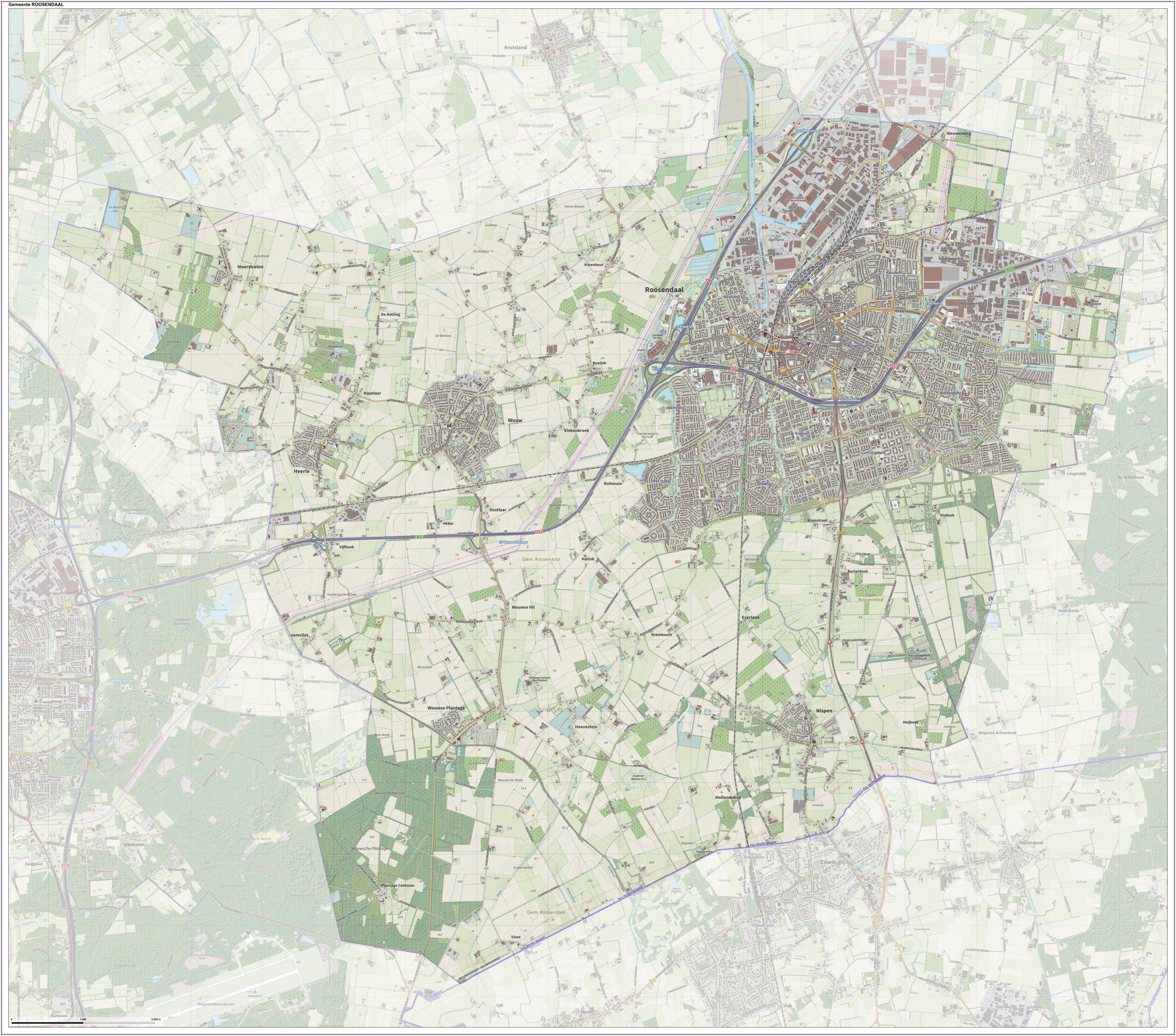
The municipality of Roosendaal, Nispen bottom right

== People born in Nispen ==
- Jeroen van Koningsbrugge, actor and comedian
- Niek van der Velden, snowboarder
- Luc Suykerbuyk, road cyclist
