= Molen van Aerden =

Windmill in the Netherlands

- Aerden's Mill
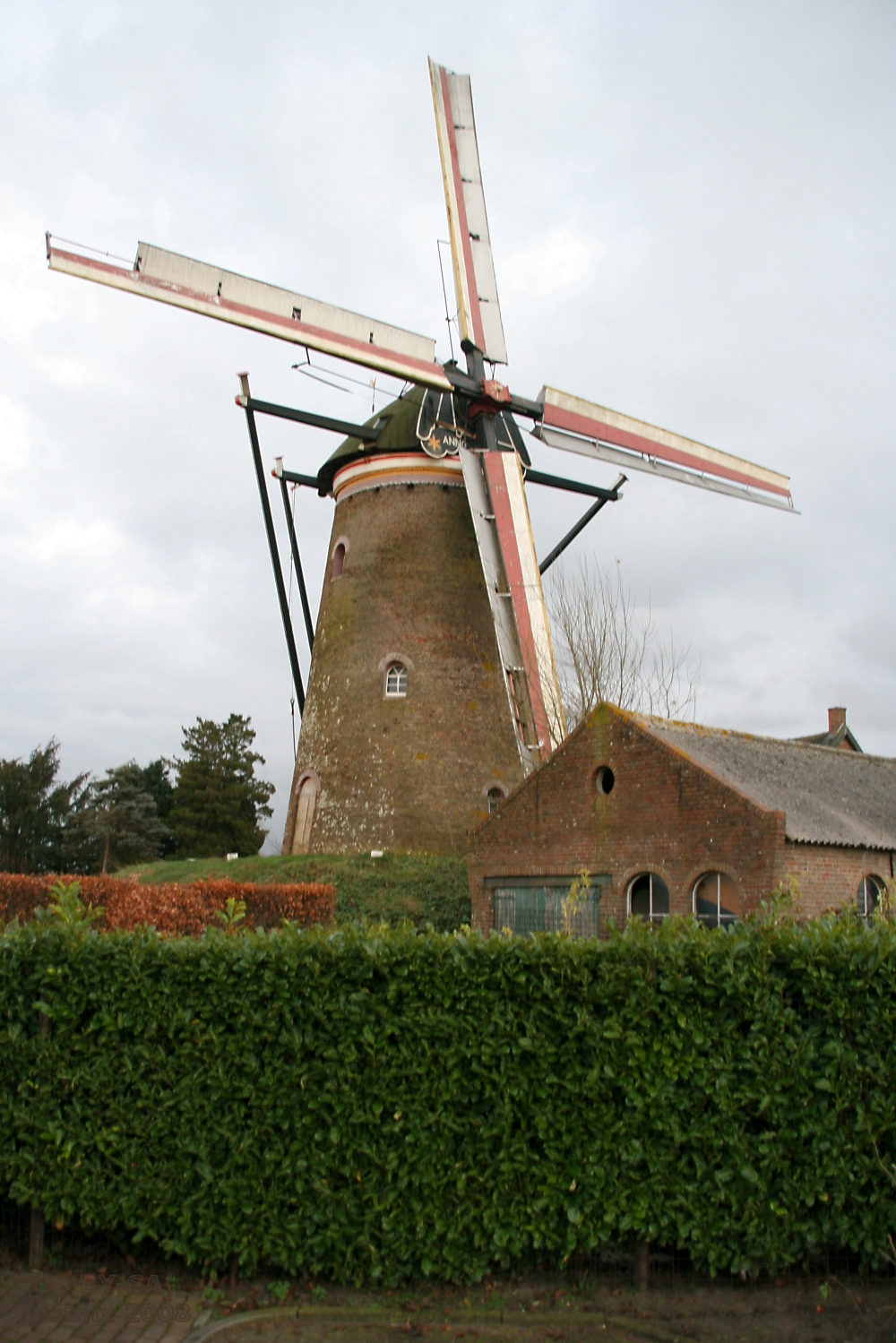
- Molen van Aerden in 2008

General information
- Status: Rijksmonument (32716)
- Type: Windmill
- Address: Dorpsstraat 26; 4709 AC, Roosendaal
- Town or city: Roosendaal
- Country: Netherlands
- Coordinates: 51.485506°N 4.460008°E
- Completed: 1850
- Designations: Gristmill, currently voluntary

References
- Database of Mills; De Hollandsche Molen

The Molen van Aerden (English: Aerden's Mill) is a windmill located on the Raadhuisstraat 28A in Nispen, Roosendaal, in the province of North Brabant, Netherlands. Built in 1850 on an artificial hill, the windmill functioned as gristmill. It was built as a tower mill and its sails have a span of 23.80 metres (78.1 ft). The mill is a national monument (nr 32716) since 19 May 1971. The Molen van Aerden can be visited by appointment.

== History ==
The mill was built in 1850 and was used as a gristmill. It was built by order of Johannes van de Wijgert, who sold it four years later to Johannes Aerden from Wouw. To be less dependent on the wind, a steam engine was placed in 1883 and a petroleum engine in 1903. In 1918 the mill was connected to the electric net. However the wind was still used until 1951. In 1936, miller M. van Riet installed his system that ensured that the mill automatically adjusted its direction to the wind. In 1975 the municipality of Roosendaal en Nispen bought the mill and had it restored. In 1998 the mill was once again in working order. To maintain the mill it would have to function regularly; however this was not done enough. Therefore, it had to be restored again in 2011.

== Gallery of images ==
Exterior

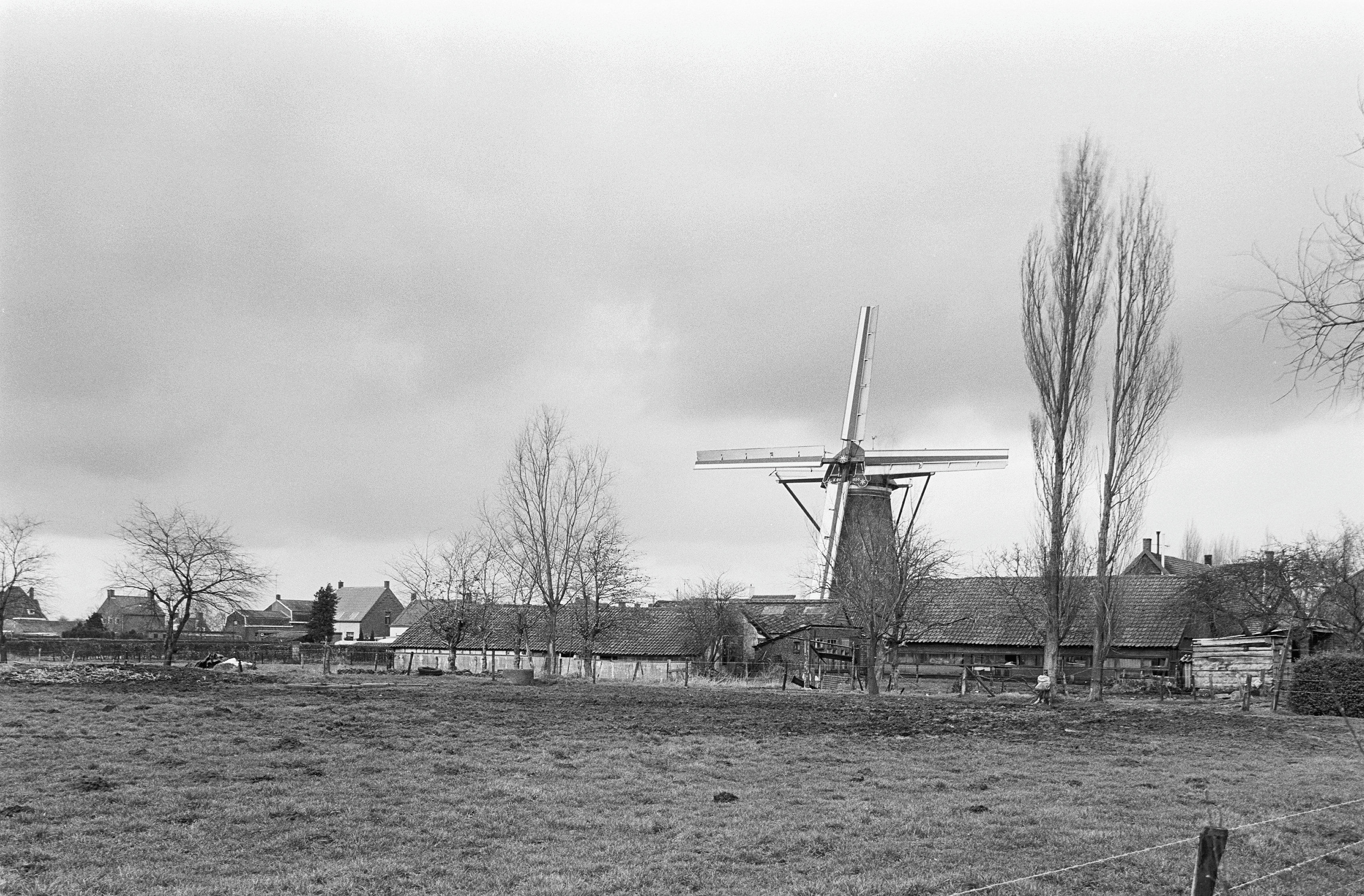
The mill and its surrounding buildings in 1981

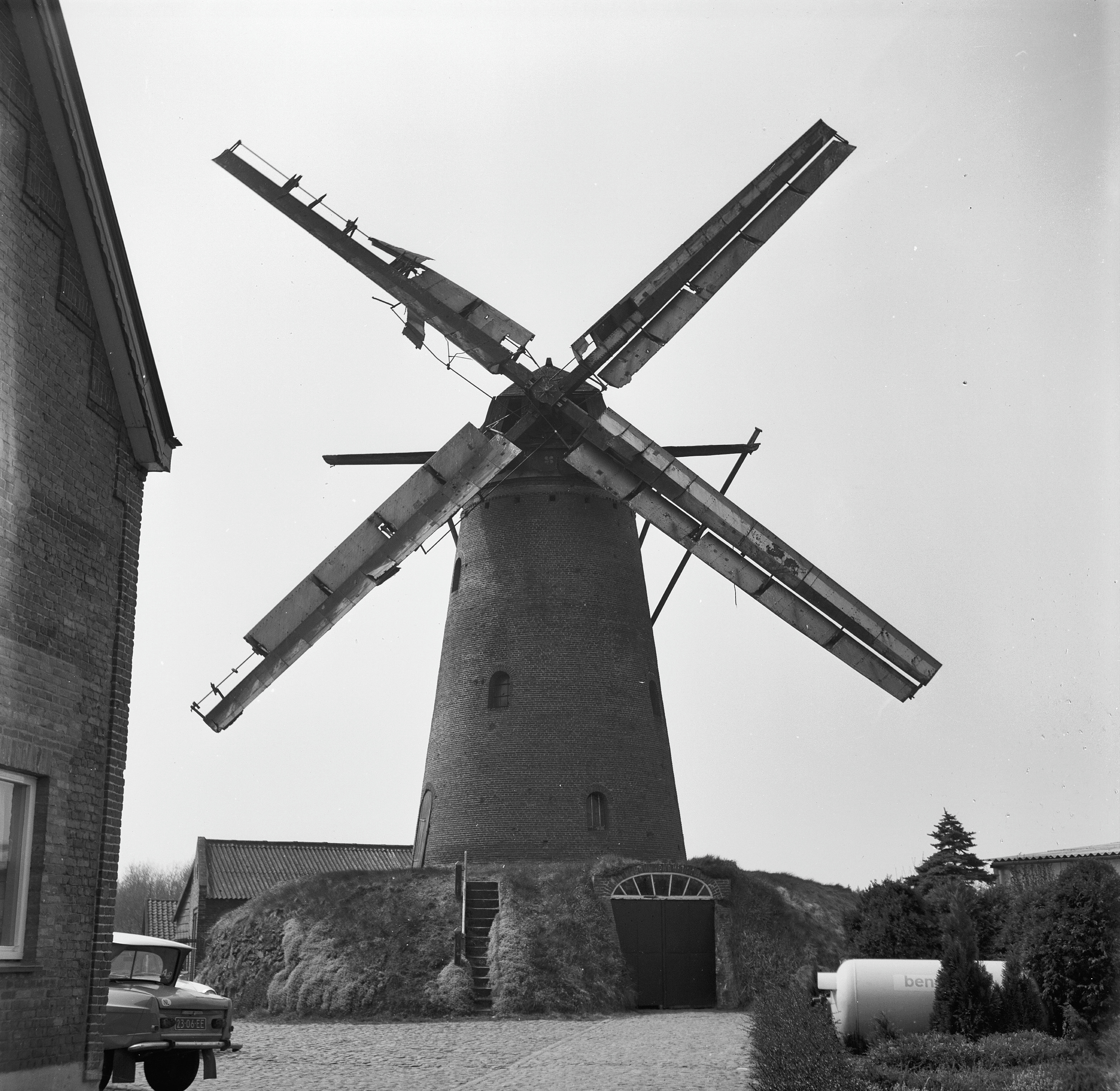
The mill is built on an artificial hill

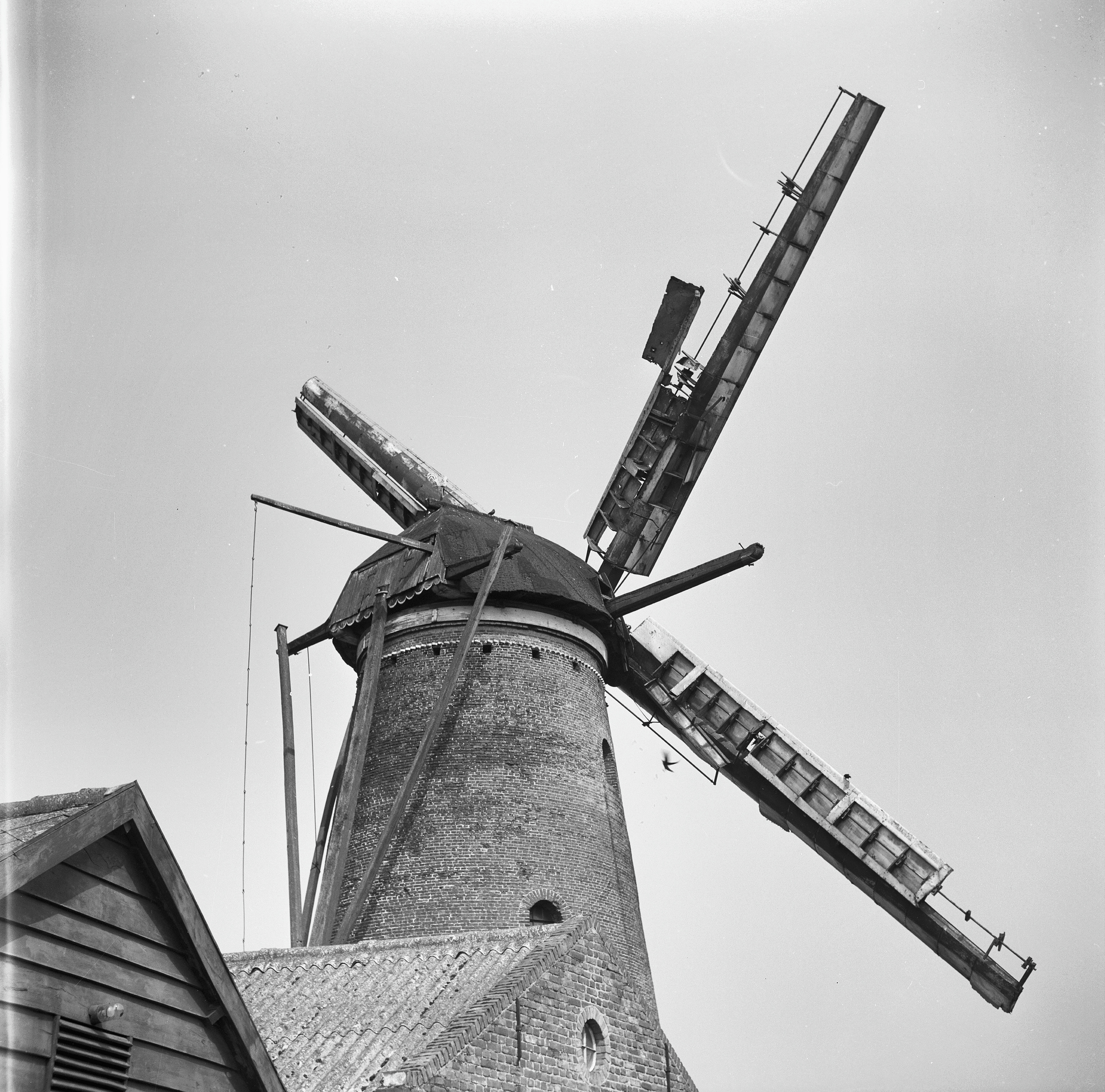
Close-up of the top half of the mill

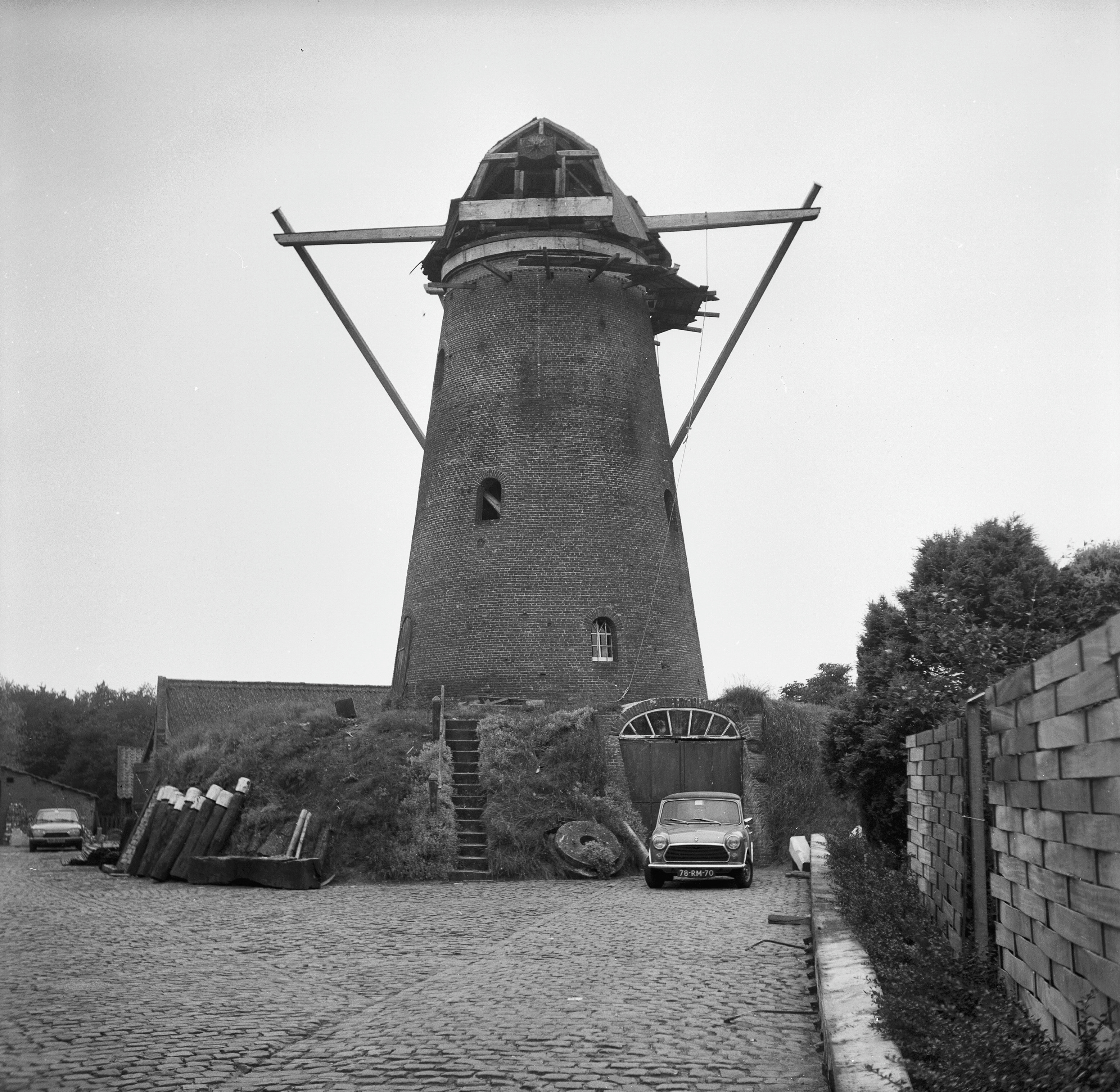
Mill without its sails
Interior

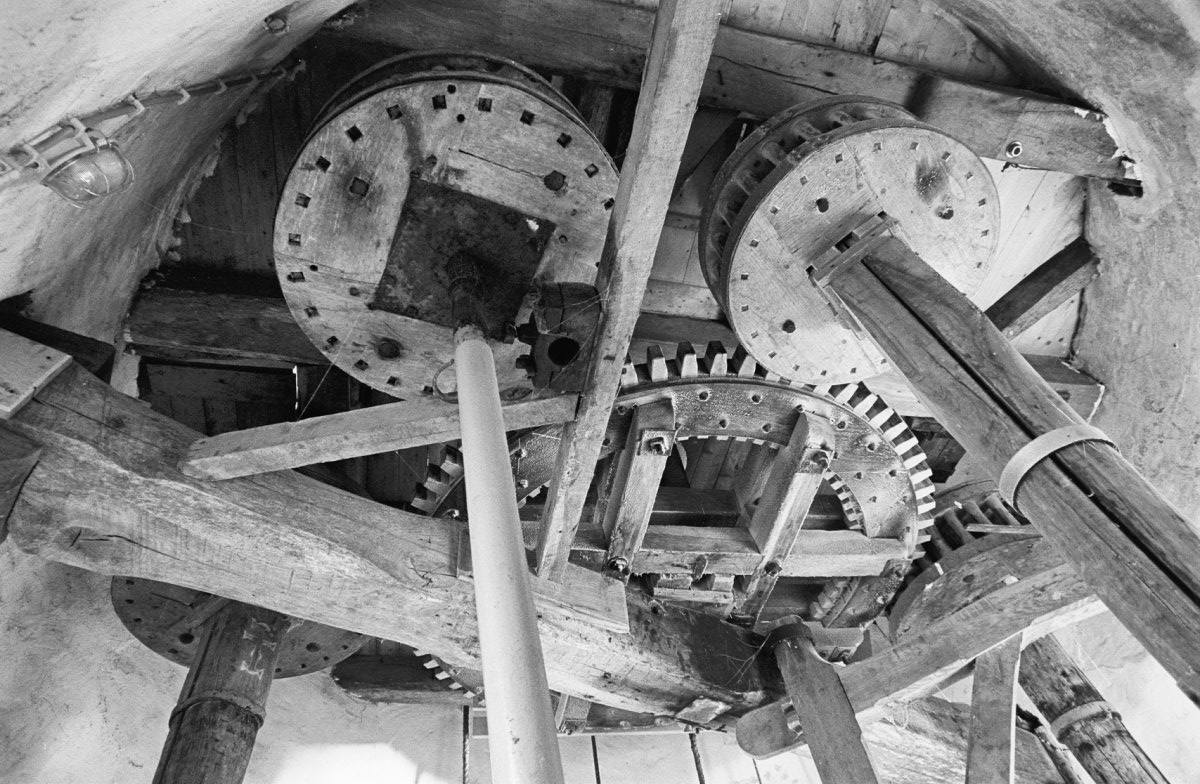

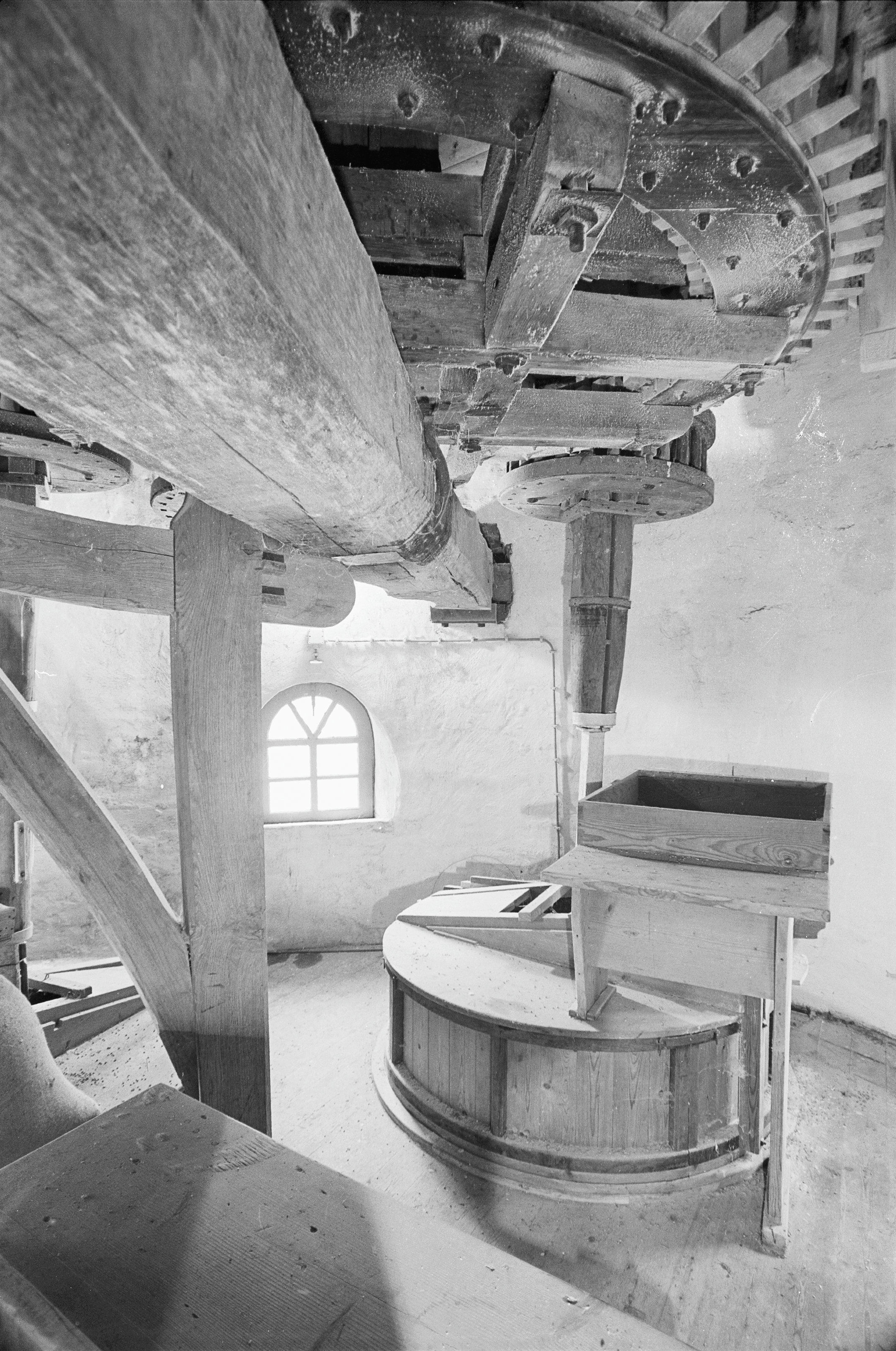

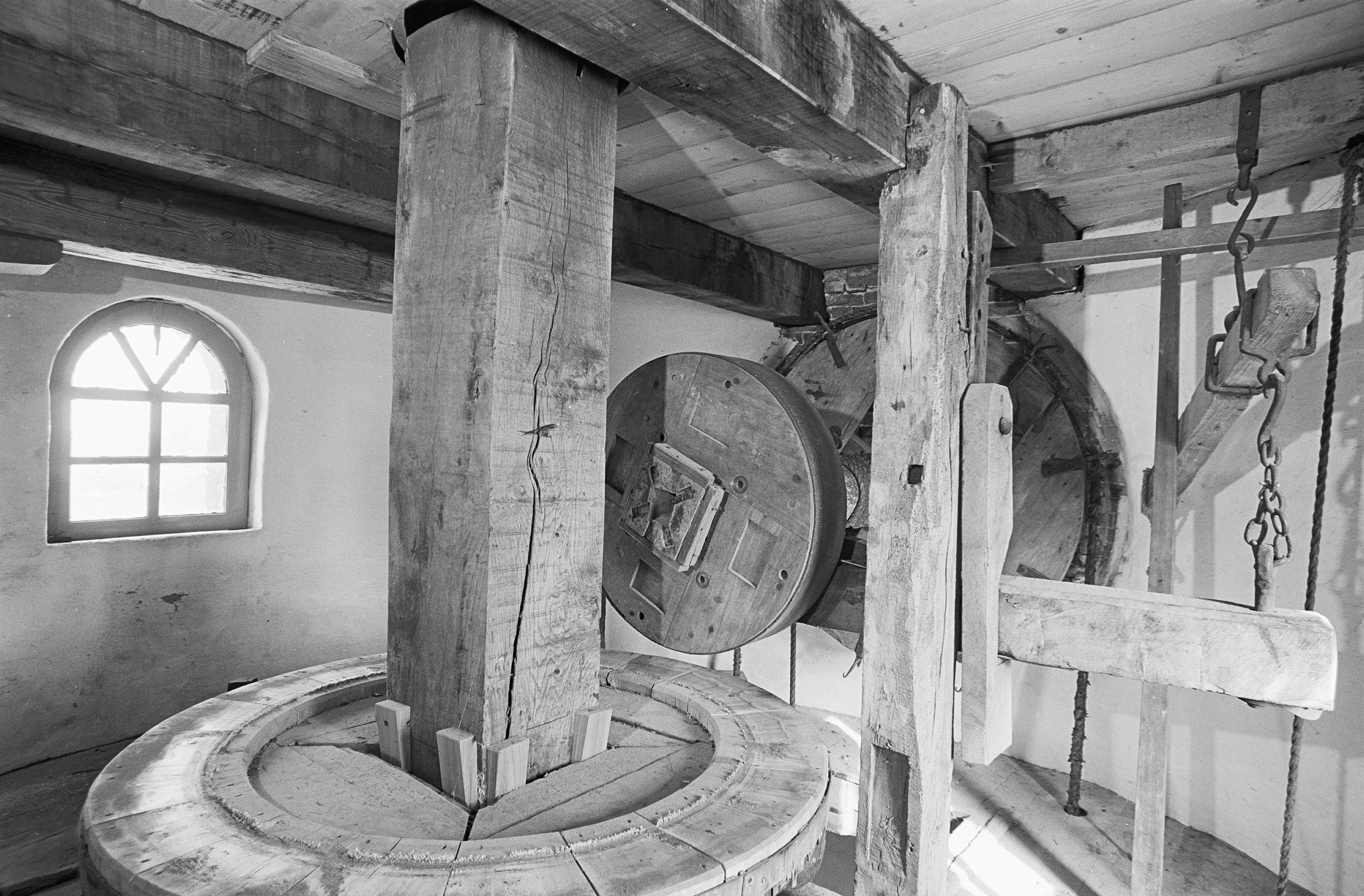

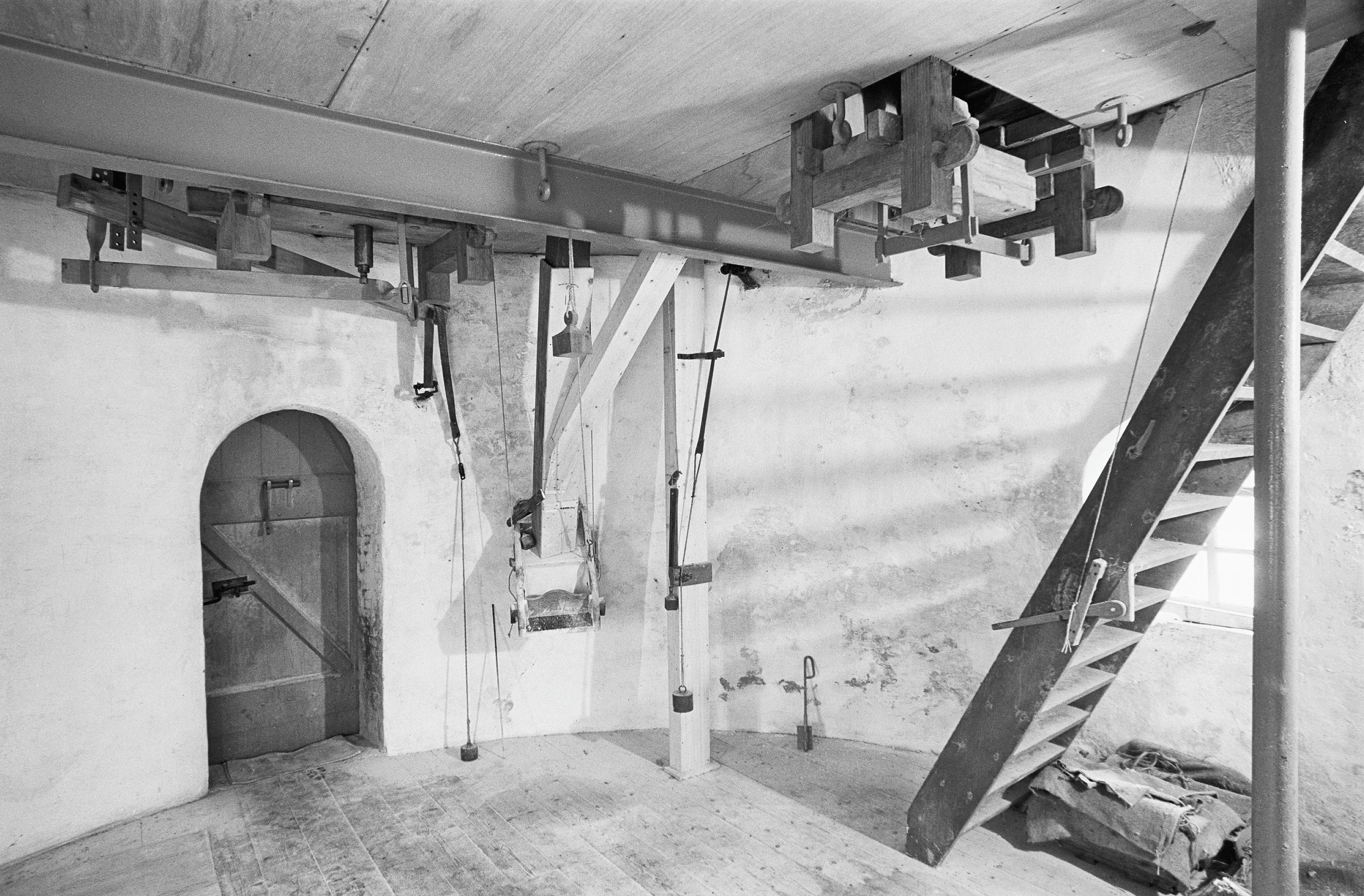

== See also ==
Other mills in North Brabant:

- Aalstermolen, in Aalst, Waalre
- Watermill at Opwetten, in Nuenen, Gerwen en Nederwetten
