= Still life paintings by Vincent van Gogh (Netherlands) =

Painting series by Vincent van Gogh

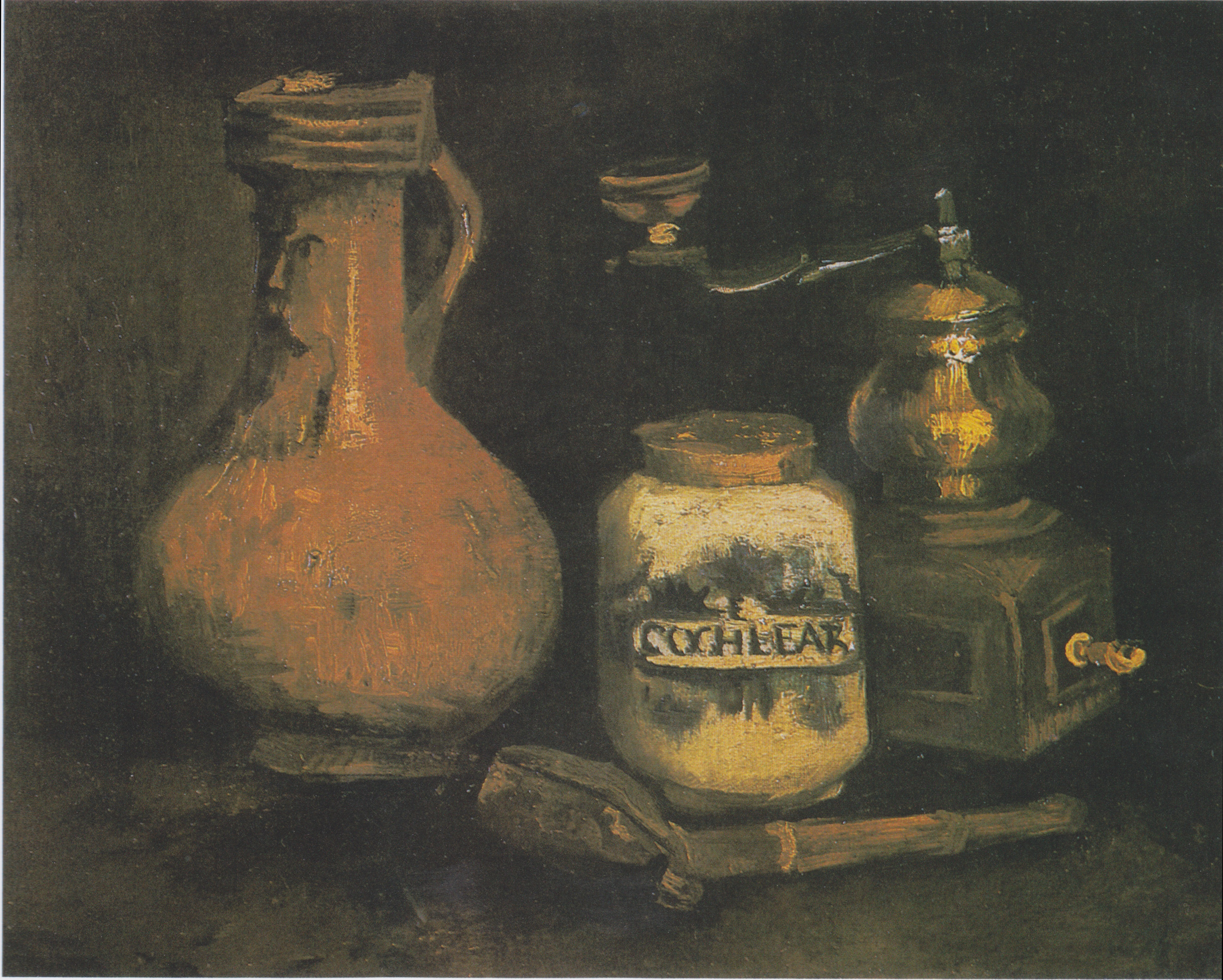
Still Life with Coffee Mill, Pipe Case and Jug also Still Life with a Bearded-Man Jar, 1884, Kröller-Müller Museum, Otterlo (F52)

Still life paintings by Vincent van Gogh (Netherlands) is the subject of many drawings, sketches and paintings made during Vincent van Gogh's early artistic career. Most still lifes made in the Netherlands are dated from 1884 to 1885, when he lived in Nuenen. His works were often in somber colors. Van Gogh experimented with the use of light falling across objects.

The next two years (1886–1887), transformed the subjects, color and techniques that van Gogh used in creating still life paintings. In Paris he painted many still life paintings of flowers, experimenting with color, light and techniques he learned from modern artists.

== Background ==
Van Gogh moved to Nuenen in 1884 where he lived for two years. Upon van Gogh's arrival, a studio was made for him from a laundry room at the back of his parents' home. Vincent's father, Reverend van Gogh wrote to his son Theo: "We do not think it’s really suitable, but we have had a proper stove installed... I wanted to put in a large window as well, but he prefers not to have one." During that time he completed numerous drawings and watercolors and nearly 200 oil paintings.

In November 1884, van Gogh taught some friends from Eindhoven, a large town near Nuenen, to paint inanimate objects in oil. Van Gogh, in his enthusiasm, created a series of still life paintings of bottles, bowls and pots and other objects. When van Gogh created still life paintings he was able to explore light and its effect on colors. A close-up of the bottle in Still Life with Straw Hat reveals that way in which van Gogh used varying shades of the same color to depict how light would fall, or be shaded, in the everyday items he painted from home or the garden.

His palette consisted mainly of dark earth tones, particularly dark brown, and he showed no sign of developing the vivid coloration that distinguishes his later, best known work. When van Gogh complained to his brother Theo van Gogh (art dealer) that he was not making enough effort to sell his paintings in Paris, Theo replied that they were too dark and not in line with the current style of bright Impressionist paintings.

=== Students ===
Van Gogh found three students who took painting classes from him. Anton Kerssemakers, a tanner of about 40 years of age, who had money and time to pursue painting, promised to make 30 paintings over the winter. He met Kerssemakers on a trip to Gennep that resulted in van Gogh's three paintings of the Water Mill at Gennep. There was also two people he called "the Hermanns" who took lessons, but weren't as intensely interested as Anton. Van Gogh said in a letter to his brother Theo that he was not looking to receive payment in money, rather he'd prefer to be rewarded by providing him tubes of paint.

=== Rumored affair ===
Van Gogh did not live at the parsonage the entire time he was in Nuenen. For a time he lived with a priest and was rumored to have become involved with the priest's servant that resulted in a pregnancy. The priest condemned van Gogh for the rumored activity and many people within the village felt he was guilty.

Van Gogh wrote in September 1885, "That affair with the priest has not given me any more trouble. But of course there will always be God-fearing natives in the village who will persist in suspecting me, for one thing is sure, namely that the priest would only too gladly throw the whole blame of that affair on me. However, as I am quite innocent, the gossip from that quarter leaves me perfectly indifferent; as long as they don't bother me in my painting. I don't take any notice of it whatever. With the peasants to whom the accident happened, where I often used to paint, I have remained on good terms, and I am as welcome in their home as I used to be."

=== Dark color ===
Van Gogh and his brother Theo exchanged letters about Vincent's propensity to use dark colors and the amount of black in his paintings. Theo was unable to sell any of his work and encouraged Vincent to explore creating work that is lighter in mood and shade.

In mid-October 1885, Vincent responded that the use of dark colors were more realistic and mature, "I am writing you rather a long letter – though perhaps you may not believe what I say about the colours, and though you may find me pessimistic when I say that much of what is called delicate grey is a very ugly grey; though you may find me pessimistic or worse when I also disapprove of the smooth polishing of faces, hands and eyes, because the great masters all worked in quite a different way, perhaps by and by your own study of art, which I am glad you took up again thoroughly, will change you too."

== Pottery, bottles and other vessels ==
=== Pottery and bottles ===
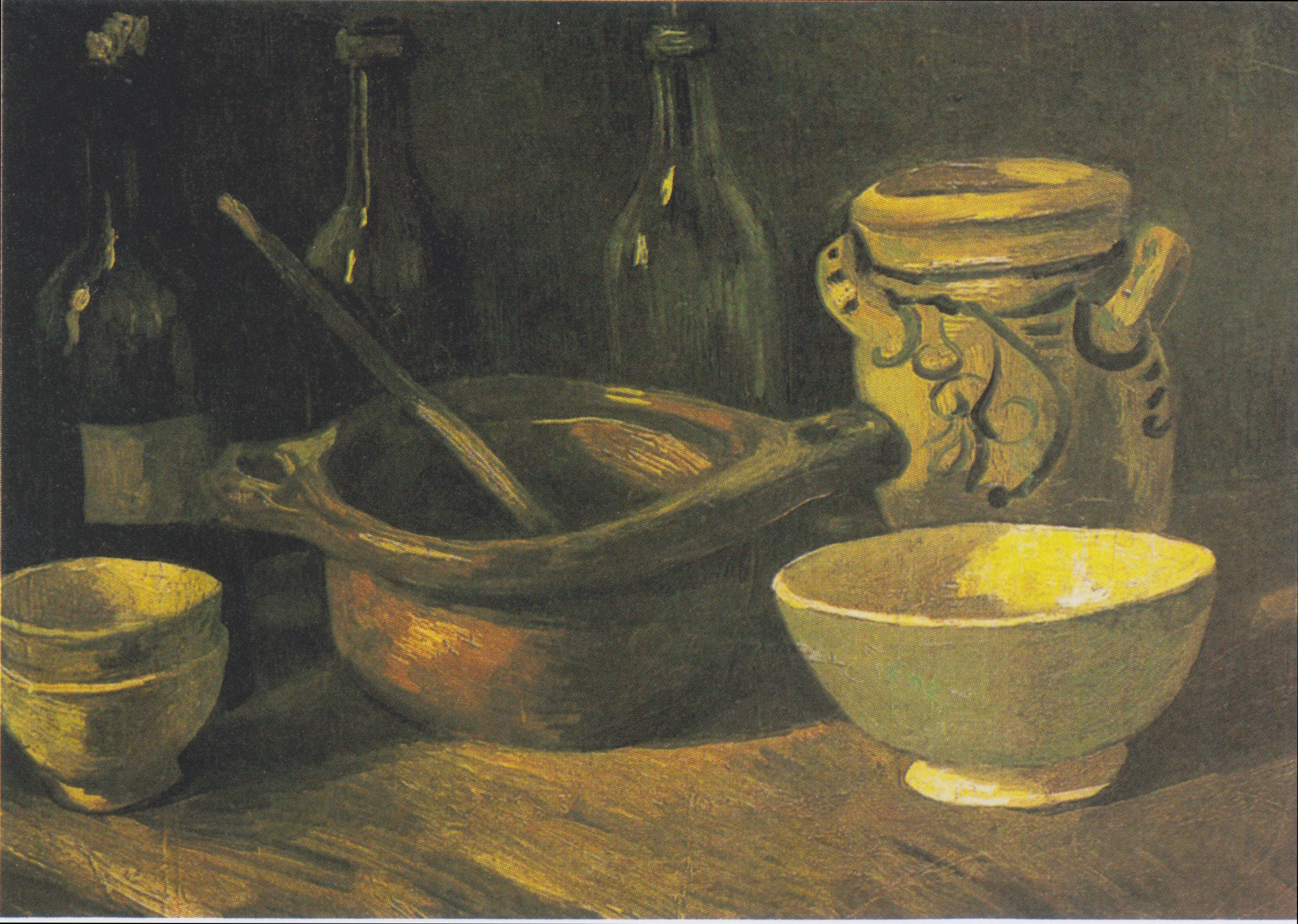
Still Life with Earthenware and Bottles, 1884, Van Gogh Museum, Amsterdam (F53). See Van Gogh Museum image for better color quality.

Still Life with Earthenware and Bottles (F53) was one of several still life paintings that van Gogh made while exploring the still life genre. In 1884, van Gogh taught painting to a small group of people in nearby Eindhoven. Van Gogh experimented with the use of contrasting colors to intensify the impact of his paintings. In this case he paired the green of the bottles against a reddish-brown earthenware pot. The painting is set against a dark background with the effect of making the inside of the bowl made in muted colors appear white.

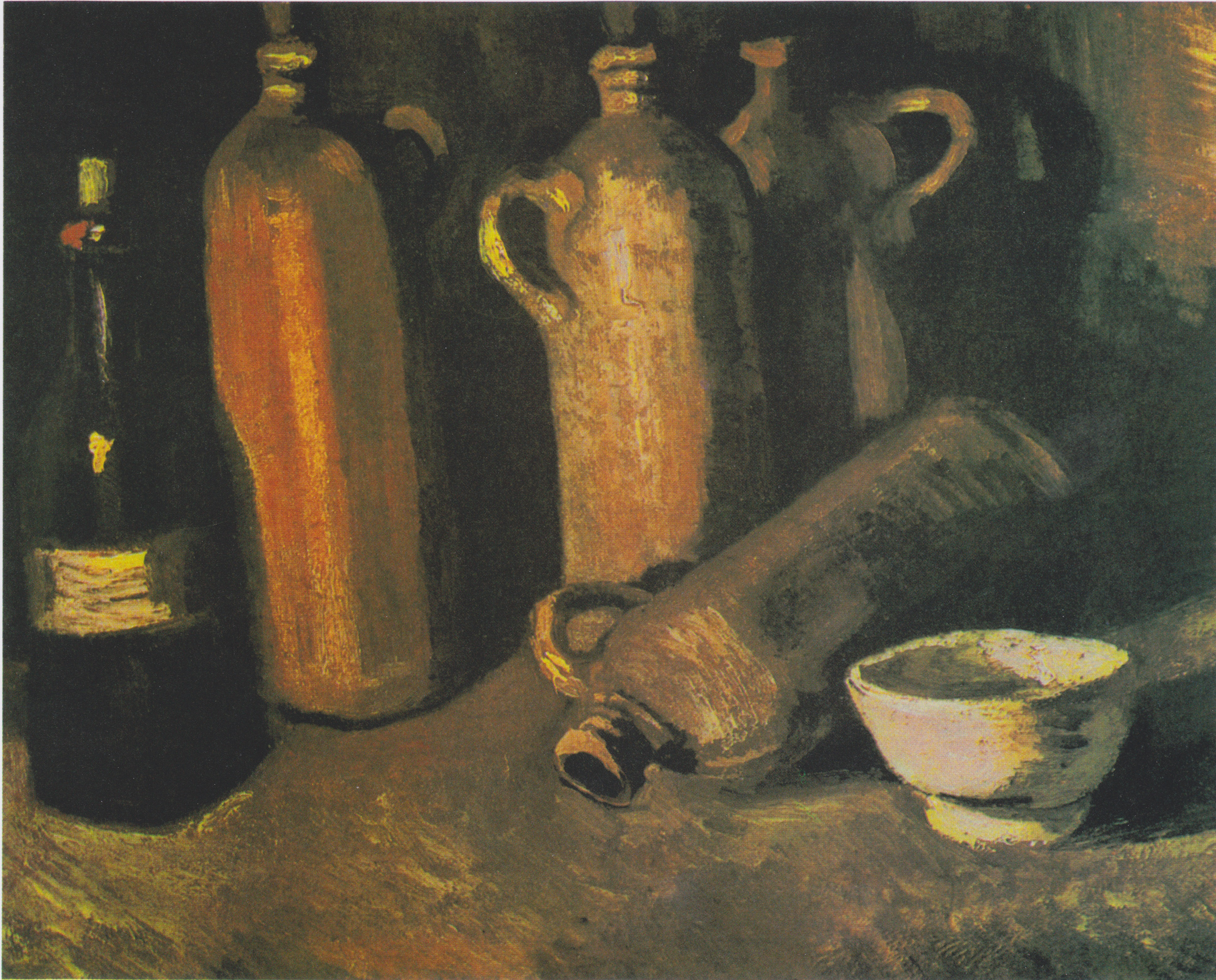
Still Life with Four Stone Bottles, Flask and White Cup, 1884, Kröller-Müller Museum, Otterlo (F50)

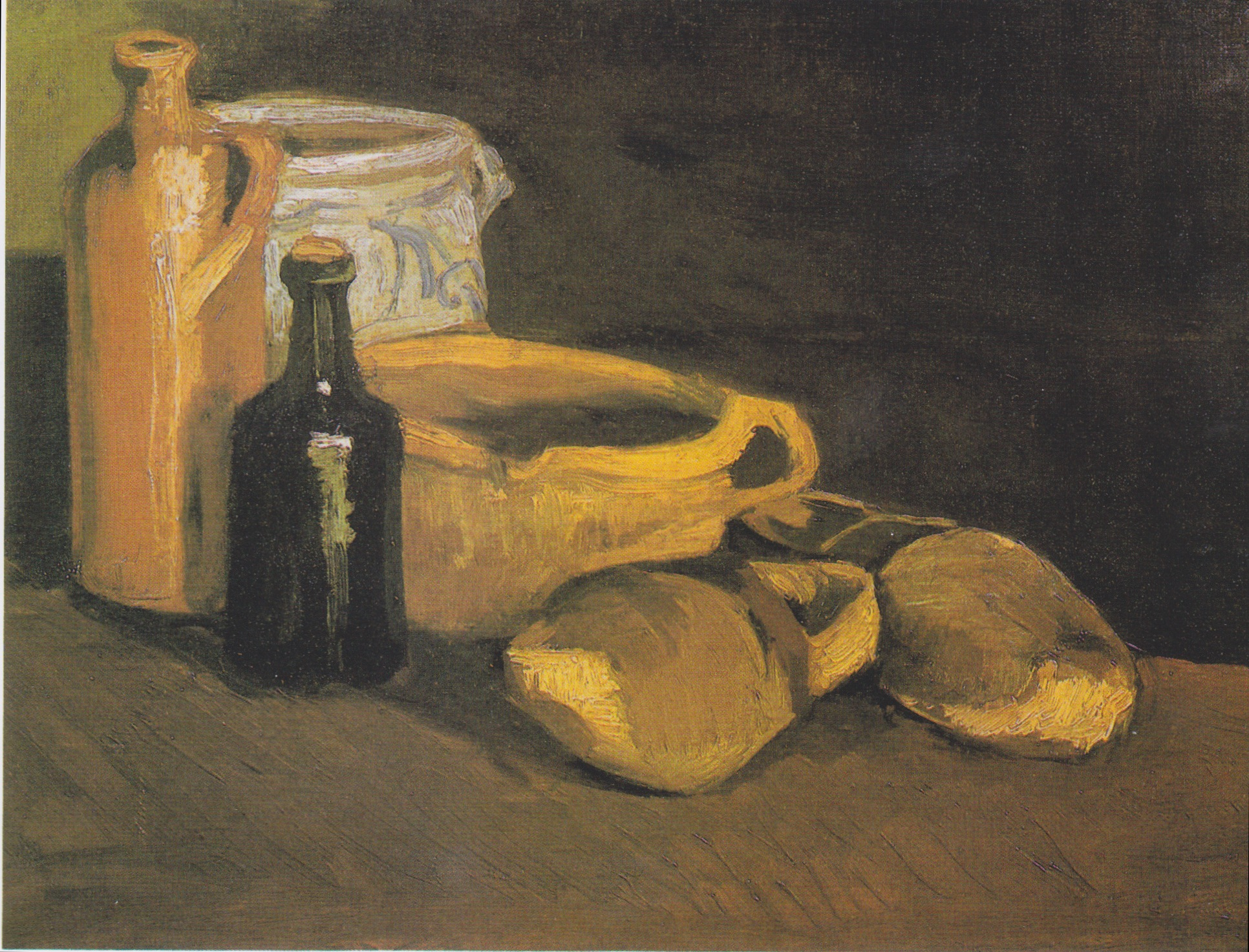
Still Life with Earthen Pots and Clogs, 1884, Centraal Museum, Utrecht, Netherlands (on loan) (F54)

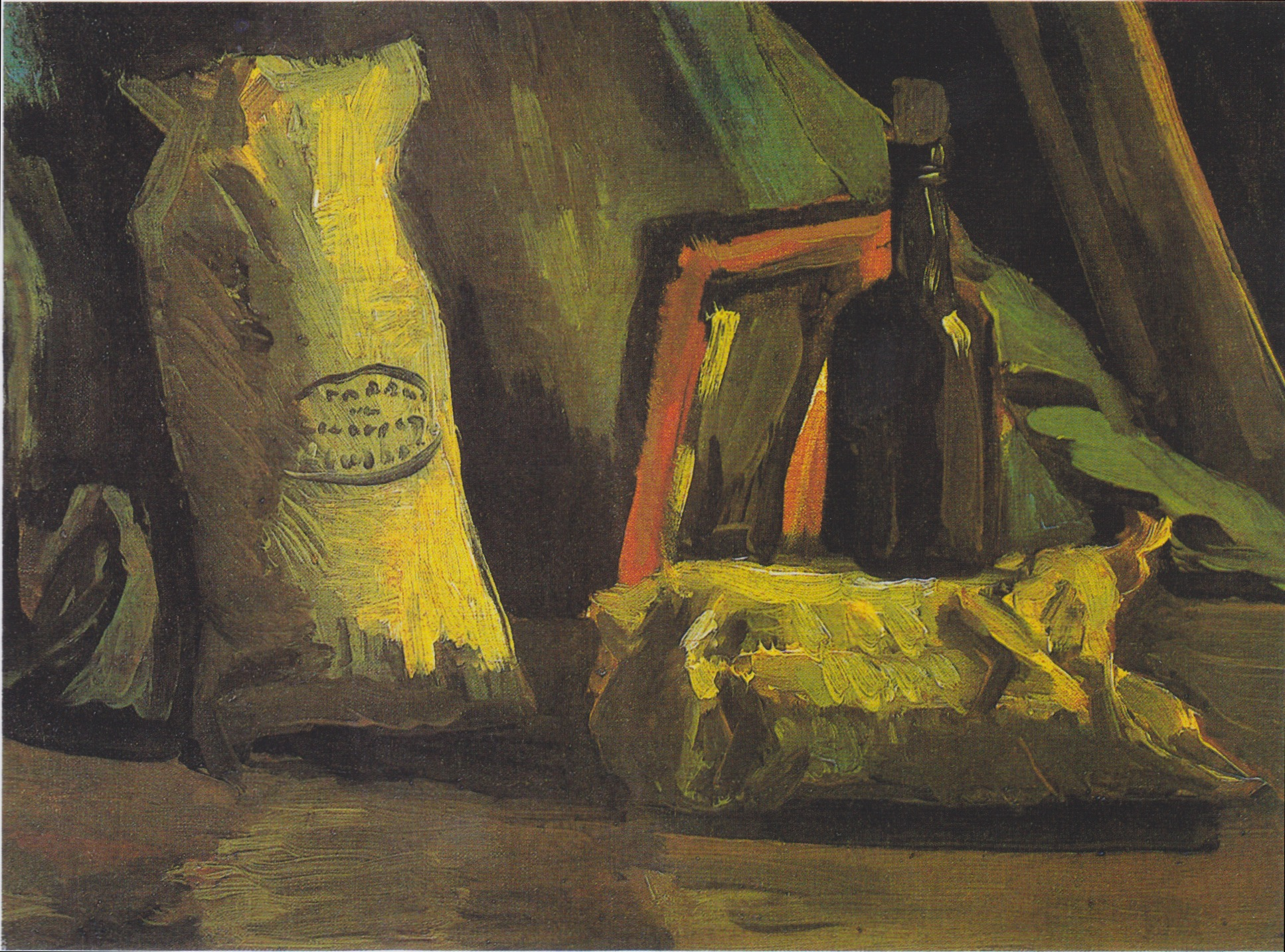
Still Life with Two Sacks and a Bottle, 1884, Private collection (F55)

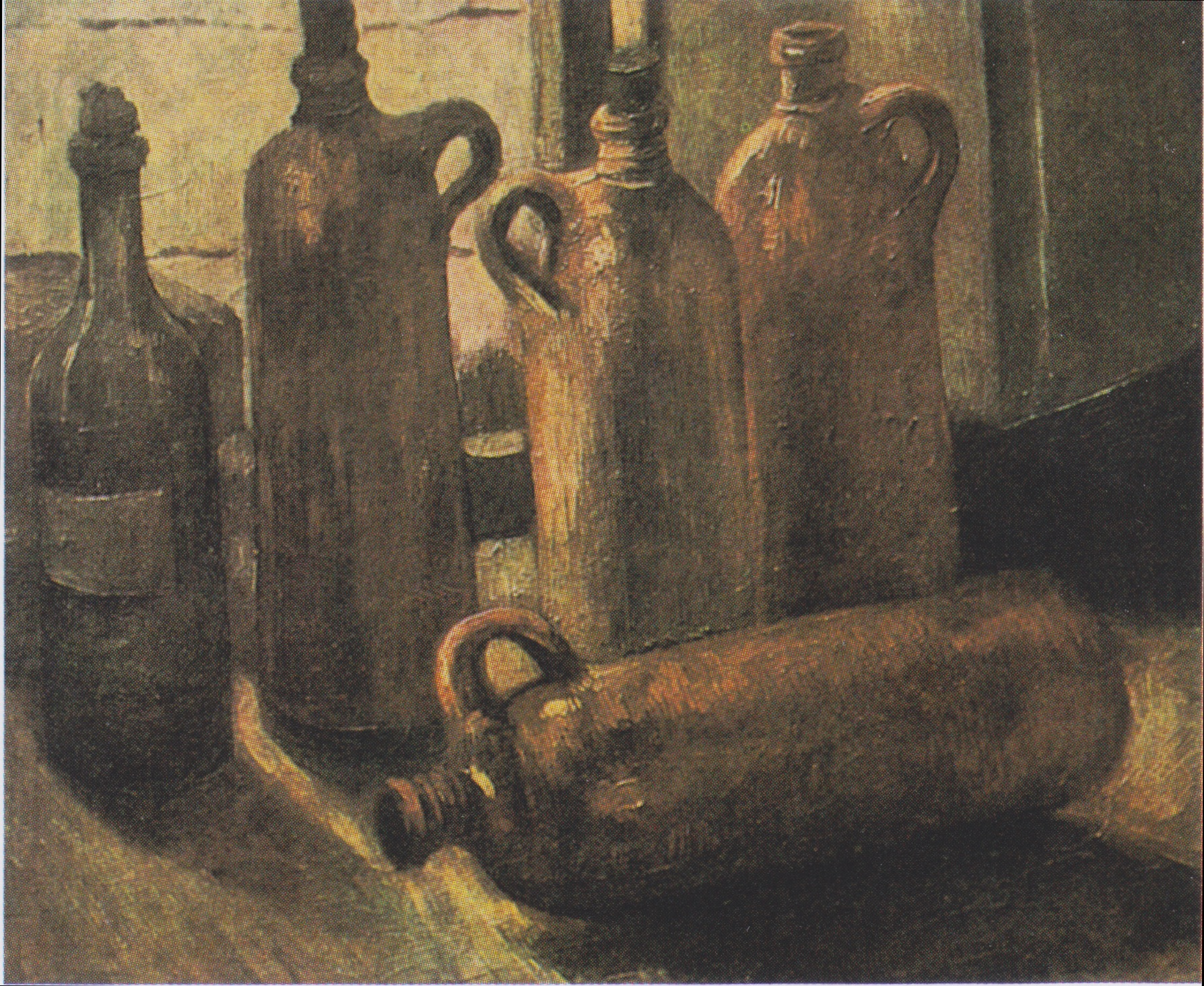
Still Life with Five Bottles, 1884, Österreichische Galerie Belvedere, Vienna (F56)

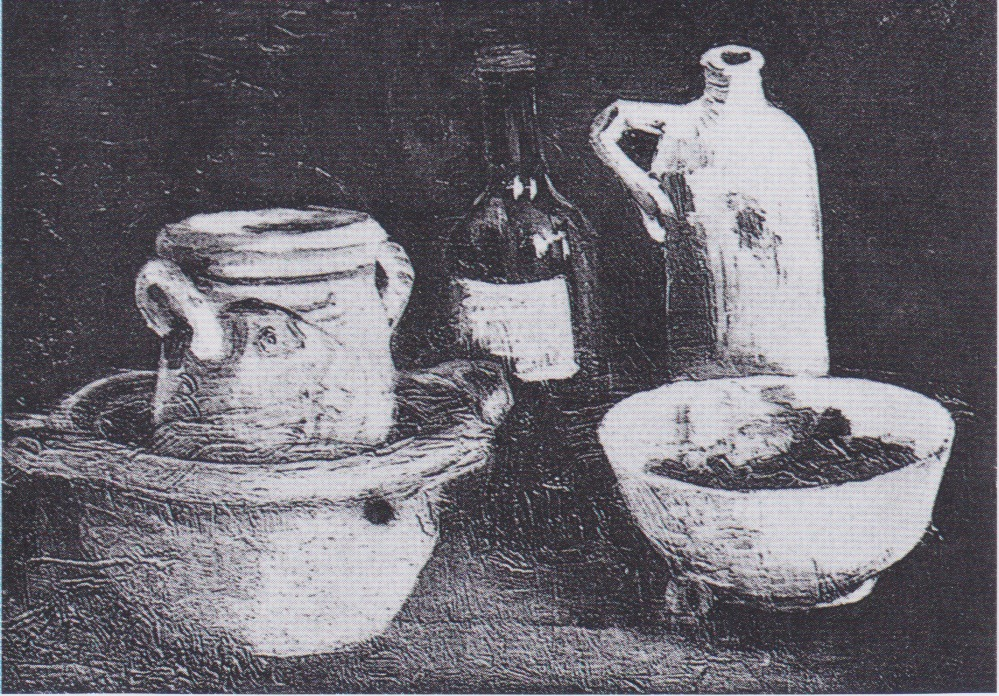
Still Life with Pottery and Two Bottles(b/w copy), 1884, Norton Simon Museum, Pasadena, California (F57)

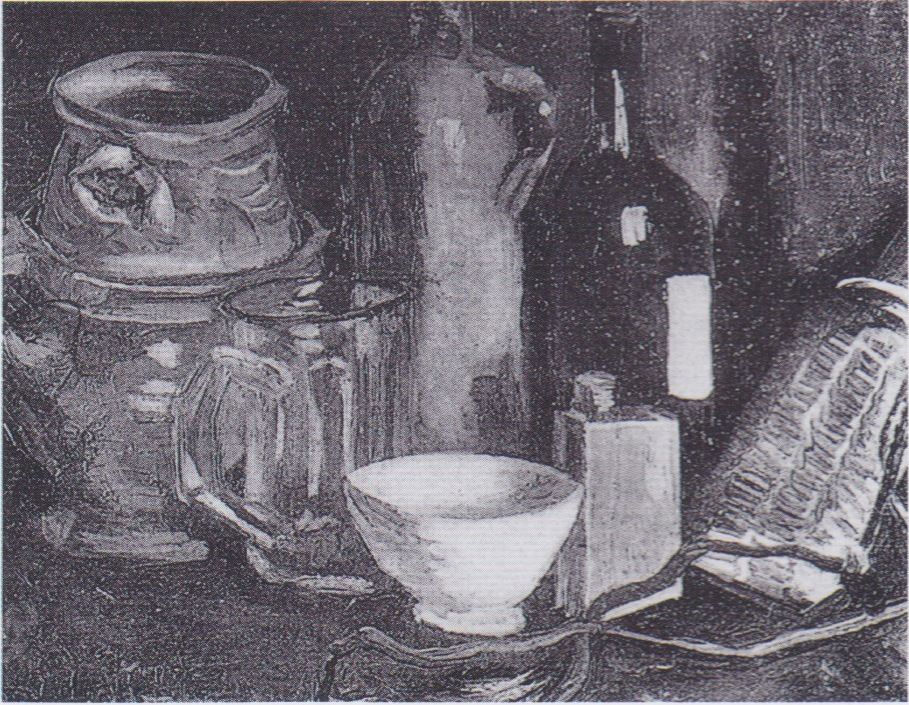
Still Life with Pottery, Beer Glass and a Bottle, 1884, Private Collection (F58)

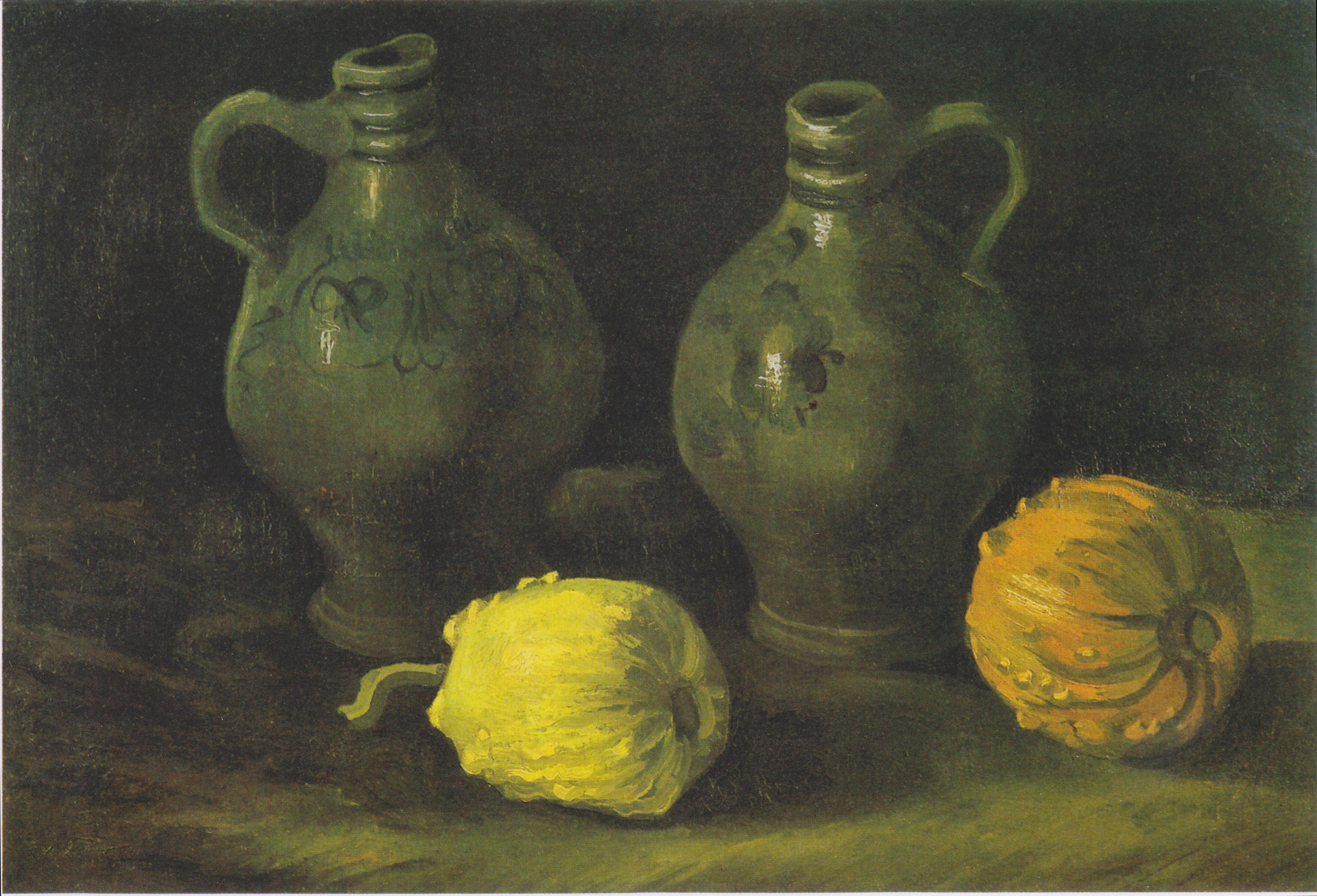
Still Life with Two Jars and Two Pumpkins, 1885, Private collection (F59)

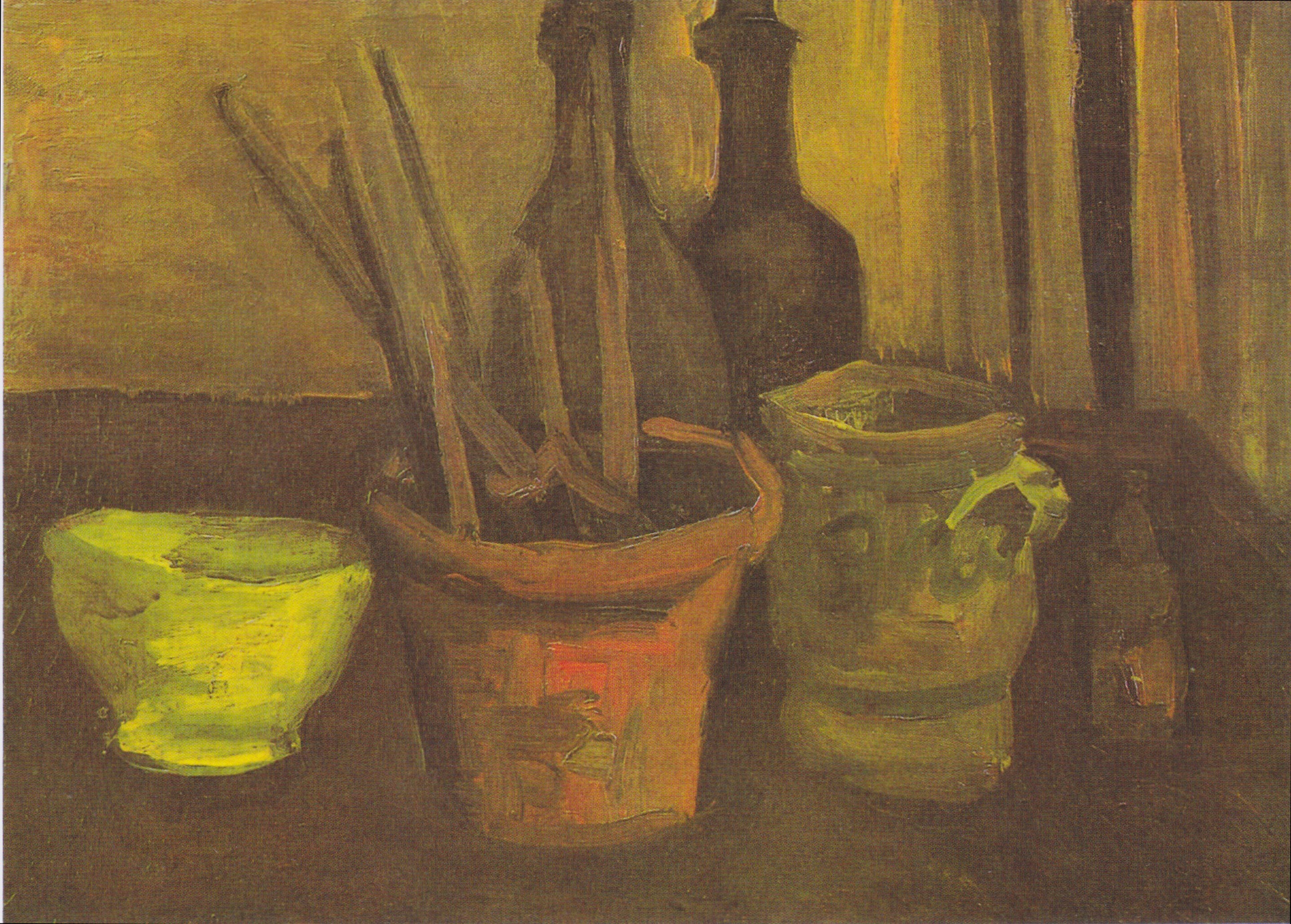
Still Life with Paintbrushes in a Pot, 1884, Private collection (F60)

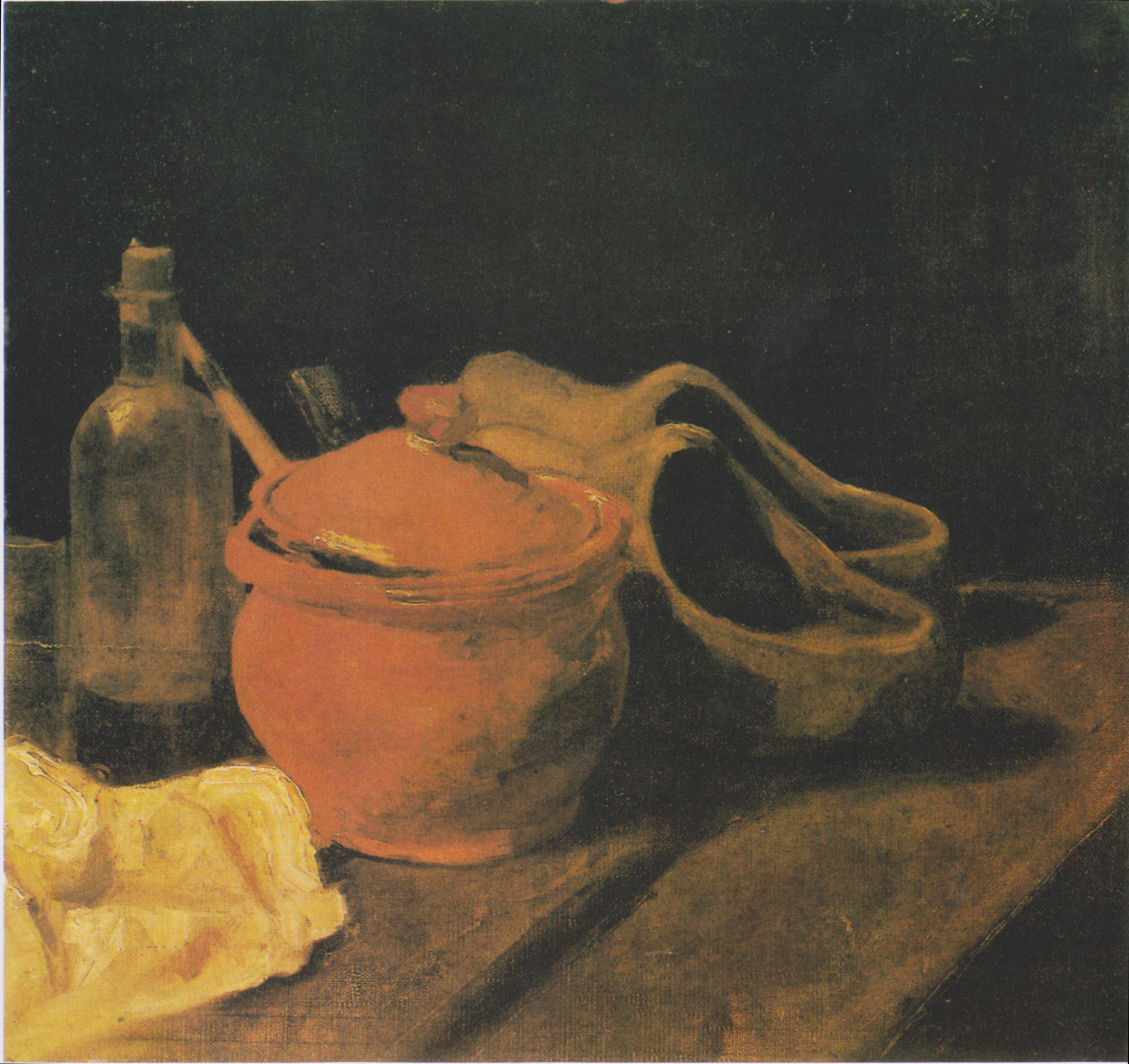
Still Life with Earthenware, Bottle and Clogs, 1885, Kröller-Müller Museum, Otterlo, Netherlands (F63)

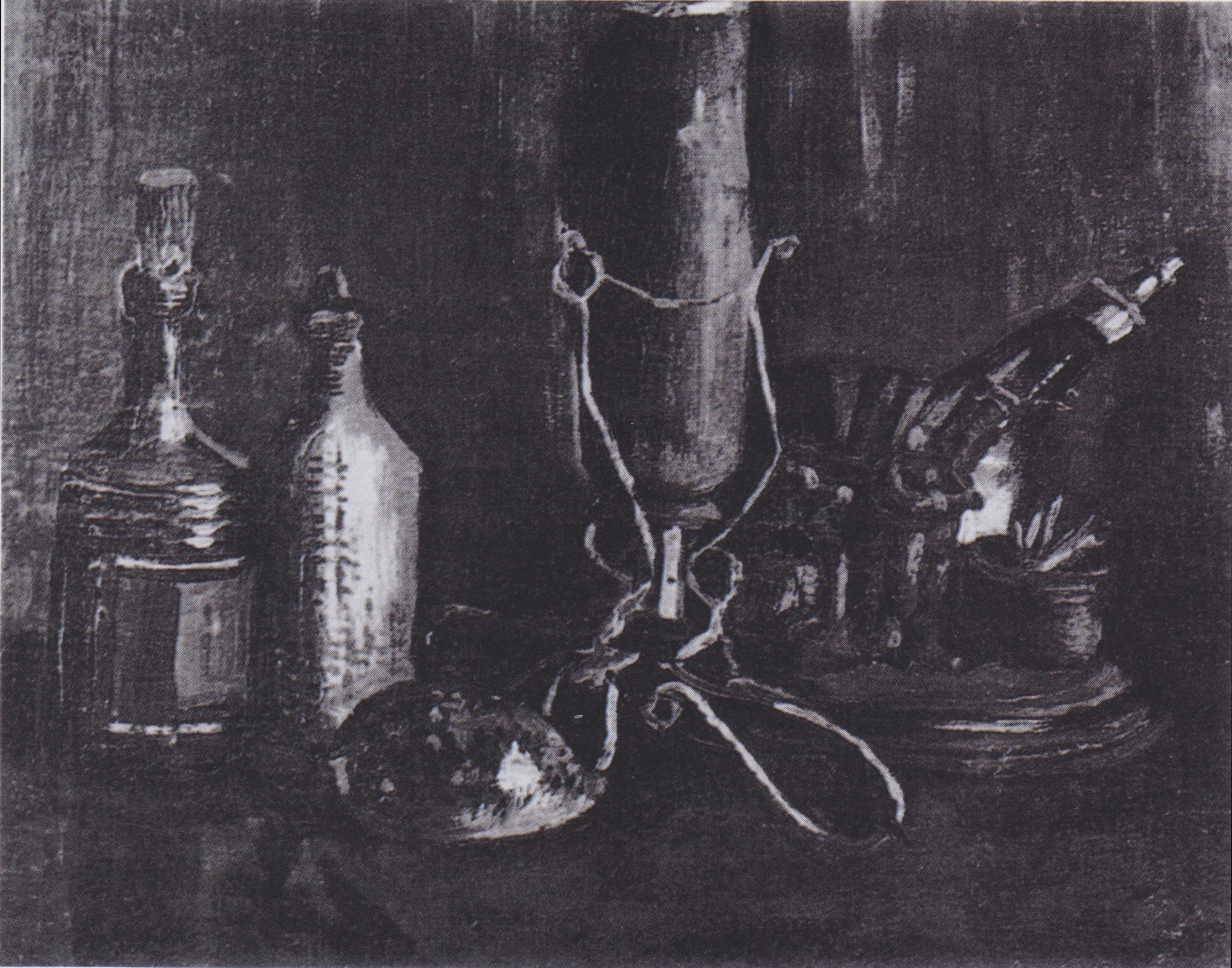
Still Life with Bottles and a Cowrie Shell, 1884, Private collection (F64)

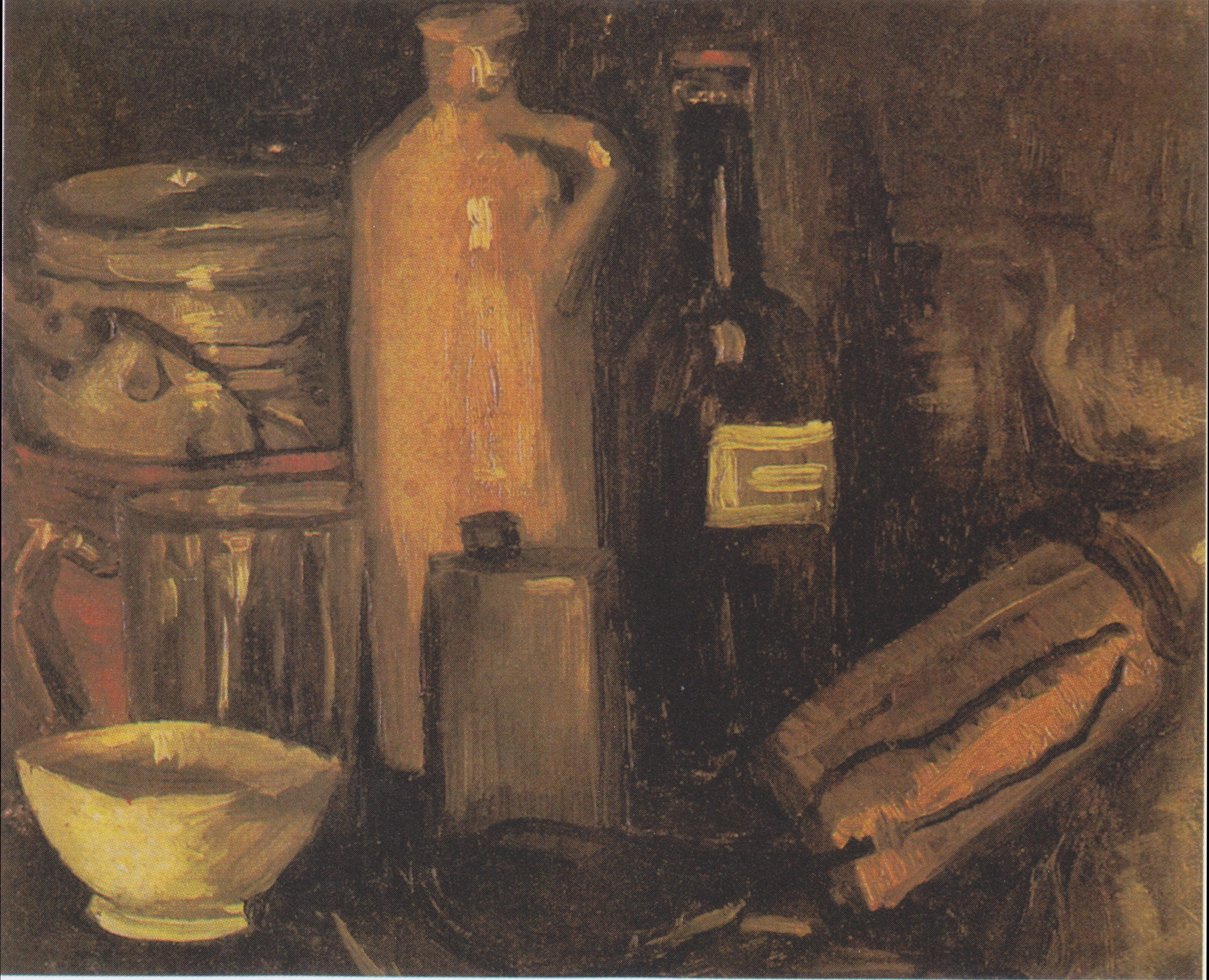
Still Life with Pots, Jar and Bottles, 1884, Gemeentemuseum Den Haag, The Hague (F178r)

=== Ginger jar ===
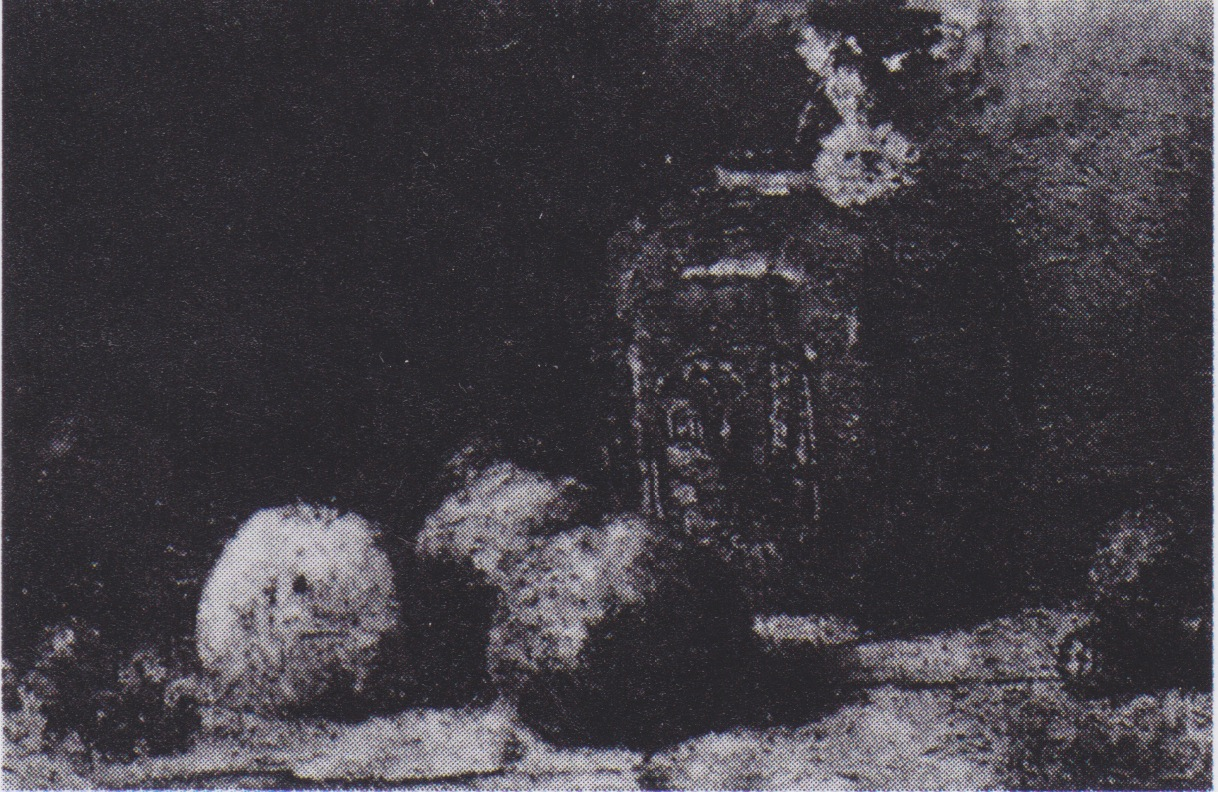
Still Life with Ginger Jar and Apples (b/w copy of painting), 1885, Private collection (F104)

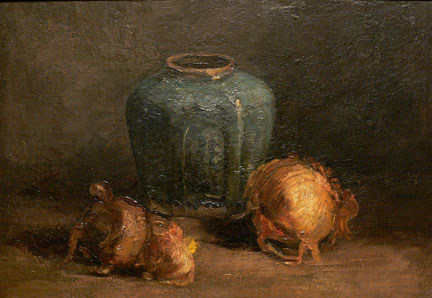
Still Life with Ginger Jar and Onions, 1885, The McMaster Art Gallery, Hamilton, Ontario (F104a)

=== Brass and copper ===
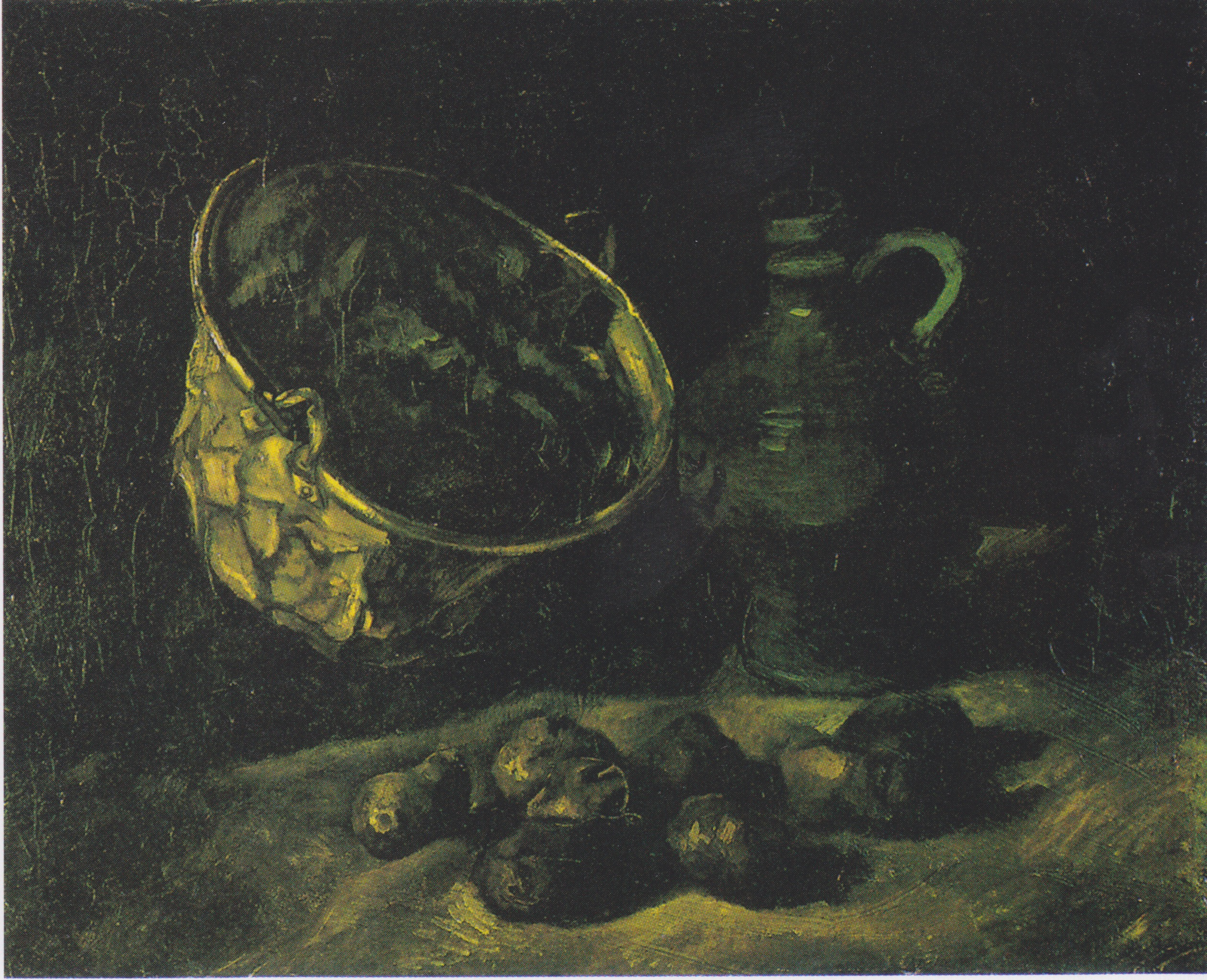
Still Life with Brass Cauldron and Jug, 1885, Van Gogh Museum, Amsterdam (F51)

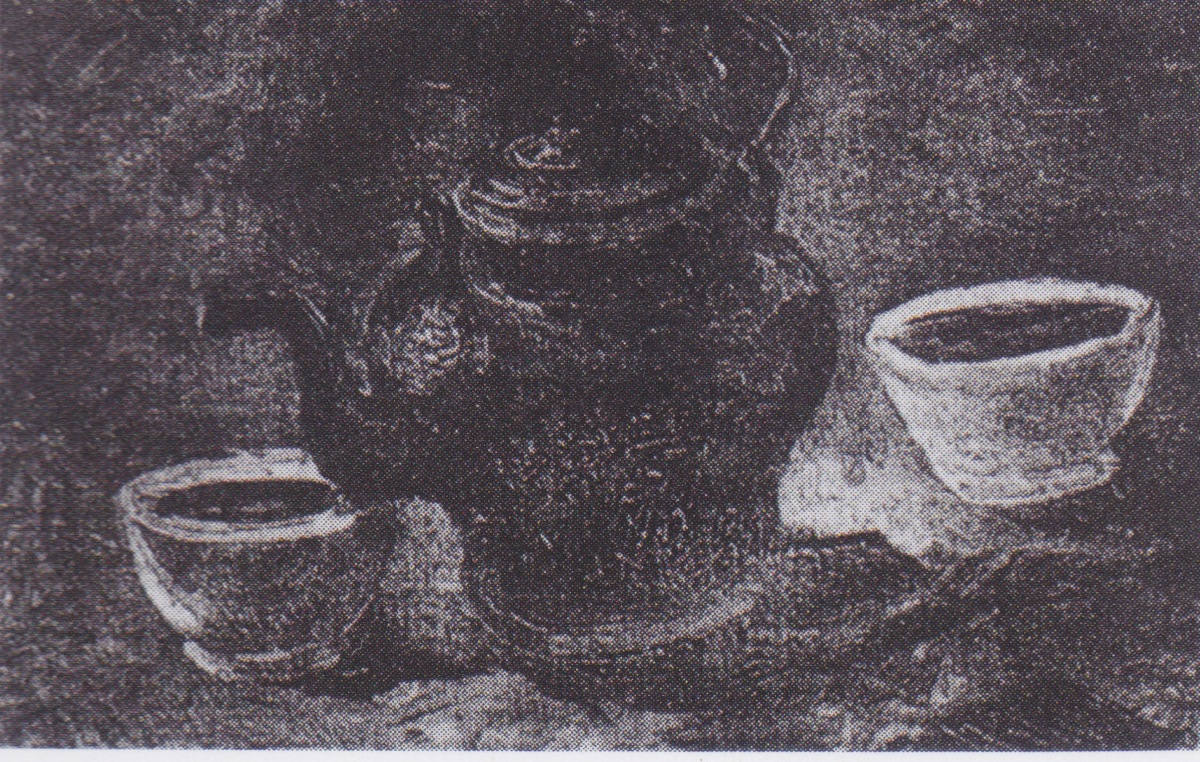
Still Life with Copper Coffeepot and Two White Bowls (b/w copy of painting), 1885, Private collection (F202)

=== Beer tankards ===
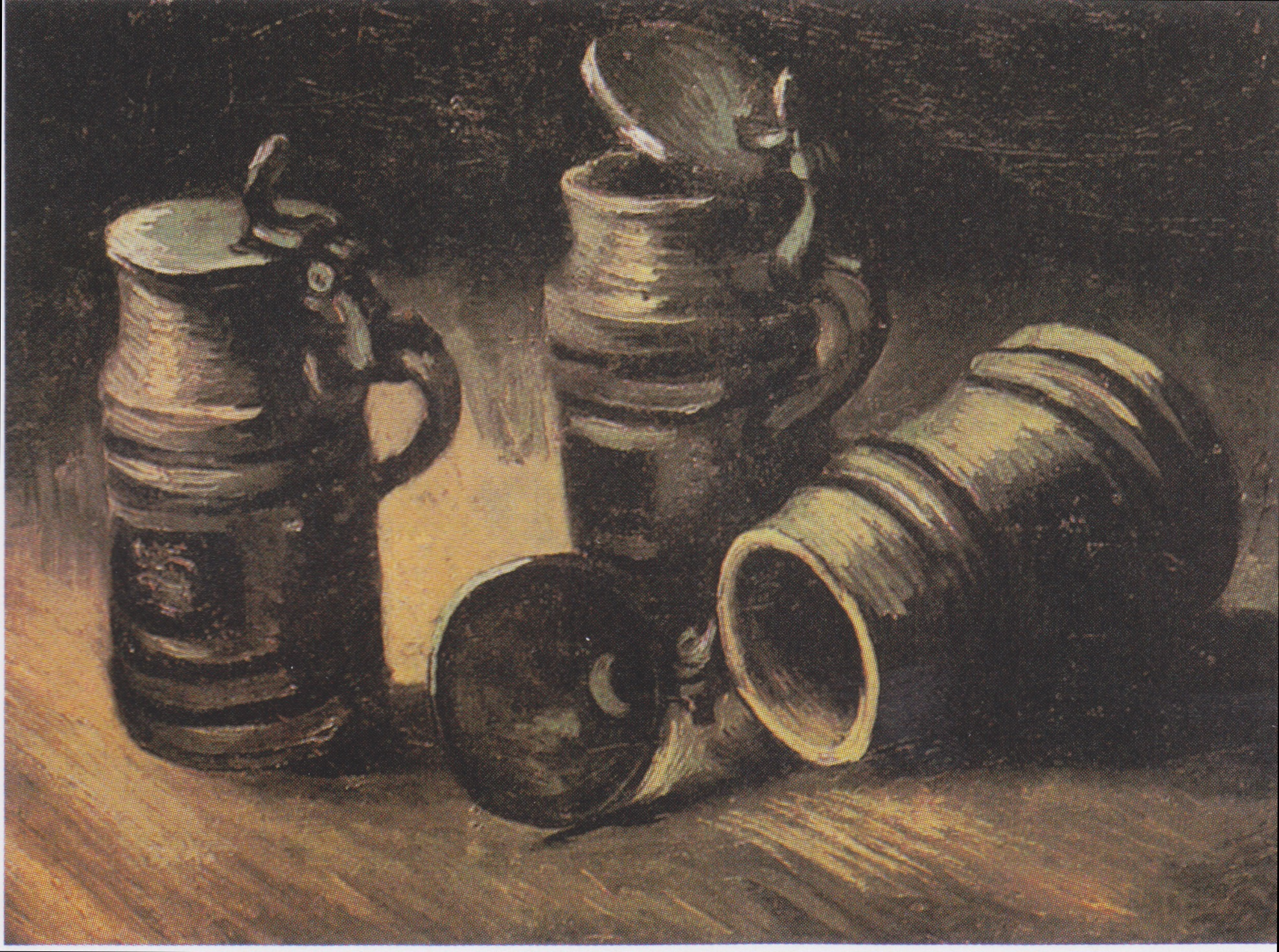
Beer Tankards, 1885, Van Gogh Museum, Amsterdam (F49)

== Bowl and baskets of fruit and vegetables ==
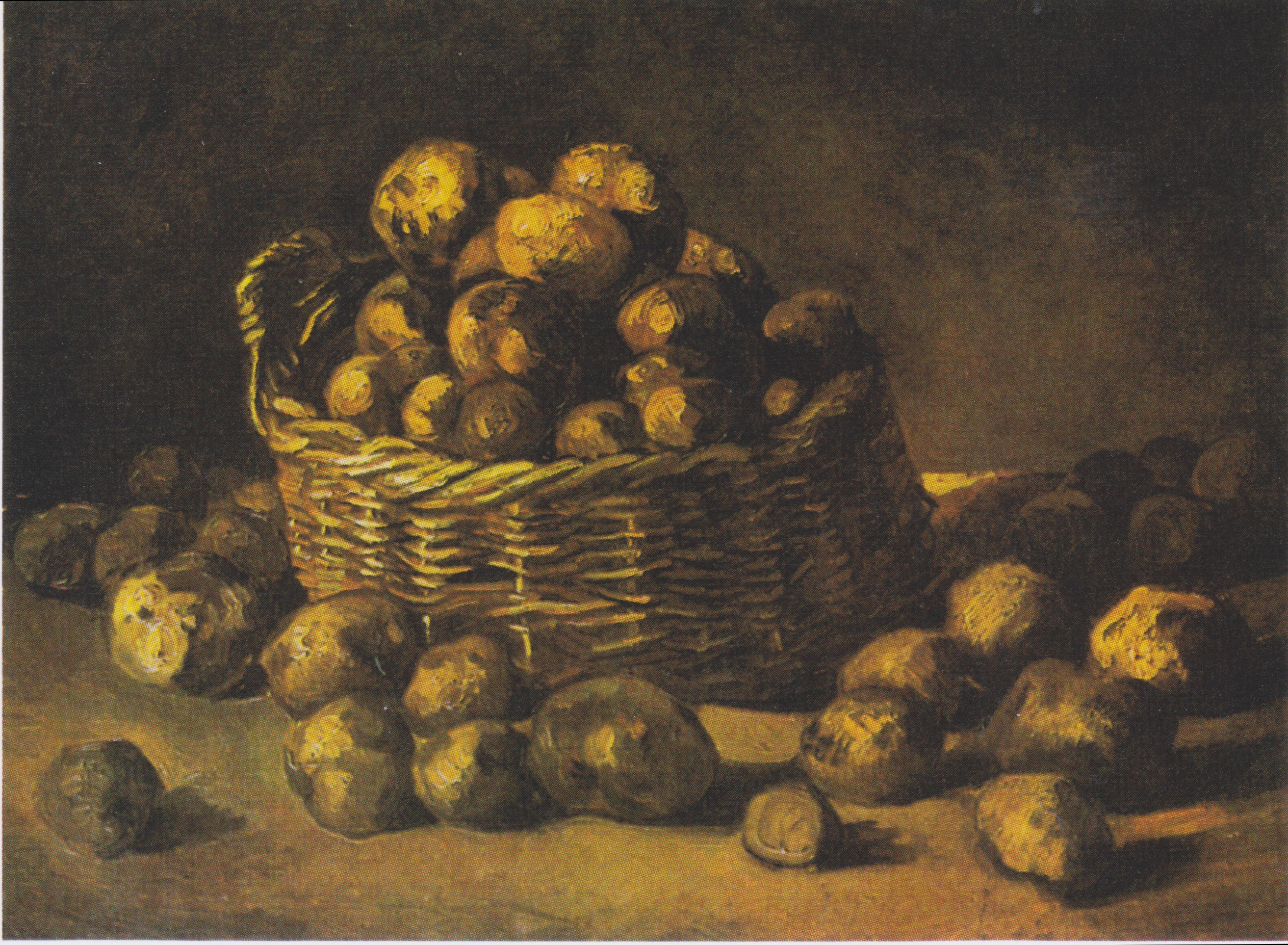
Baskets of Potatoes, 1885, Van Gogh Museum, Amsterdam (F100)

Van Gogh lived with his parents in Nuenen in 1884 and 1885 when the still life paintings were made. Behind the vicarage was a large enclosed yard with vegetable plots and a small orchard. Van Gogh made many paintings of the resulting produce, such as potatoes, cabbages, and apples.

The Van Gogh Museum describes van Gogh's Baskets of Potatoes (F100) as follows: a "dark still life is a tonal exercise; that is, a study of the effects which can be achieved using varying shades of a limited number of colors." Van Gogh's intention was to create a realistic portrayal of the basket of potatoes. In a letter to his brother Theo, van Gogh wrote: "You will receive a big still life of potatoes, in which I tried to get corps, I mean, to express the material in such a way that they become heavy, solid lumps – which would hurt you if they were thrown at you, for instance."

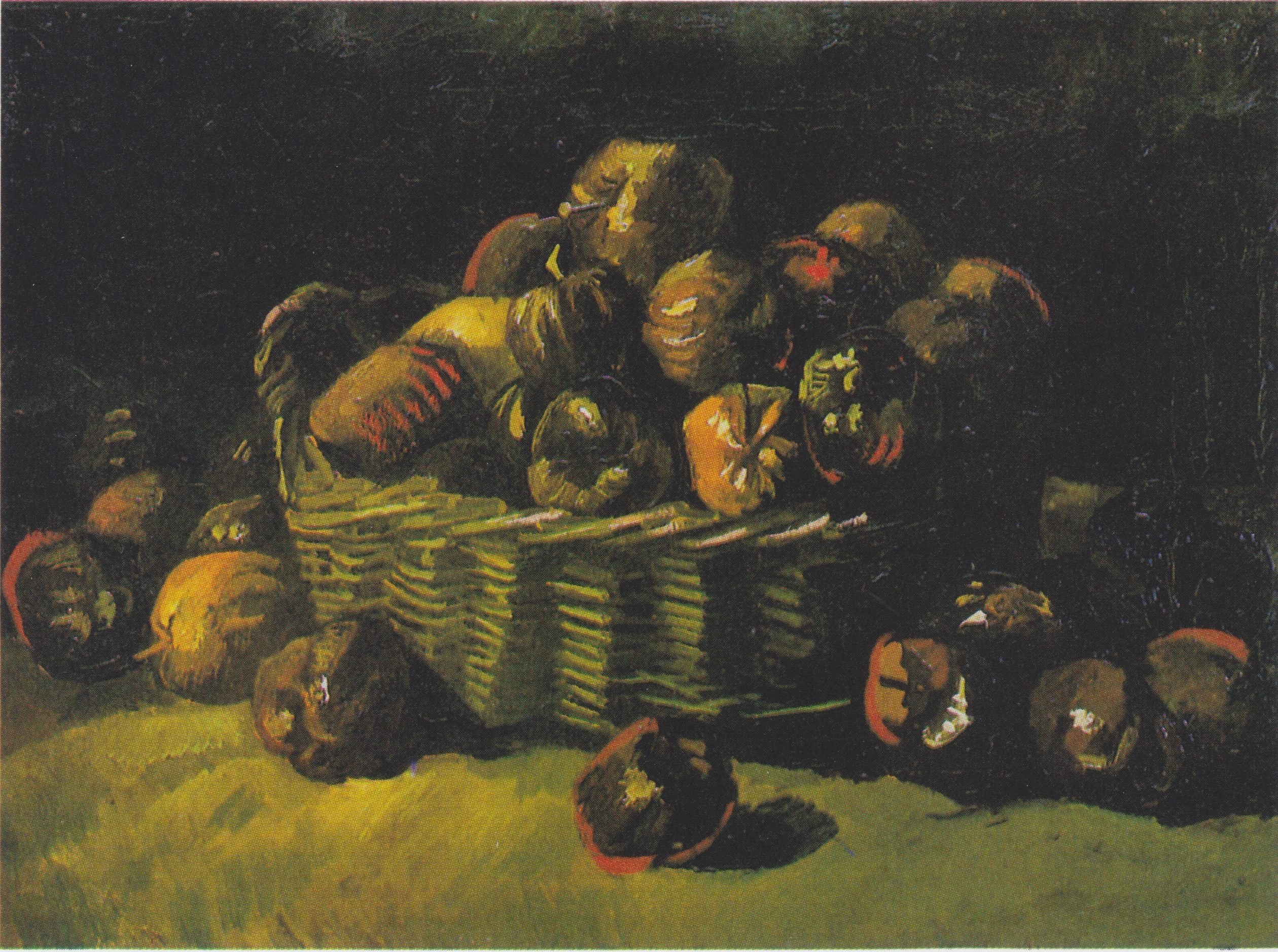
Basket of Apples, 1885, Van Gogh Museum, Amsterdam (F99)

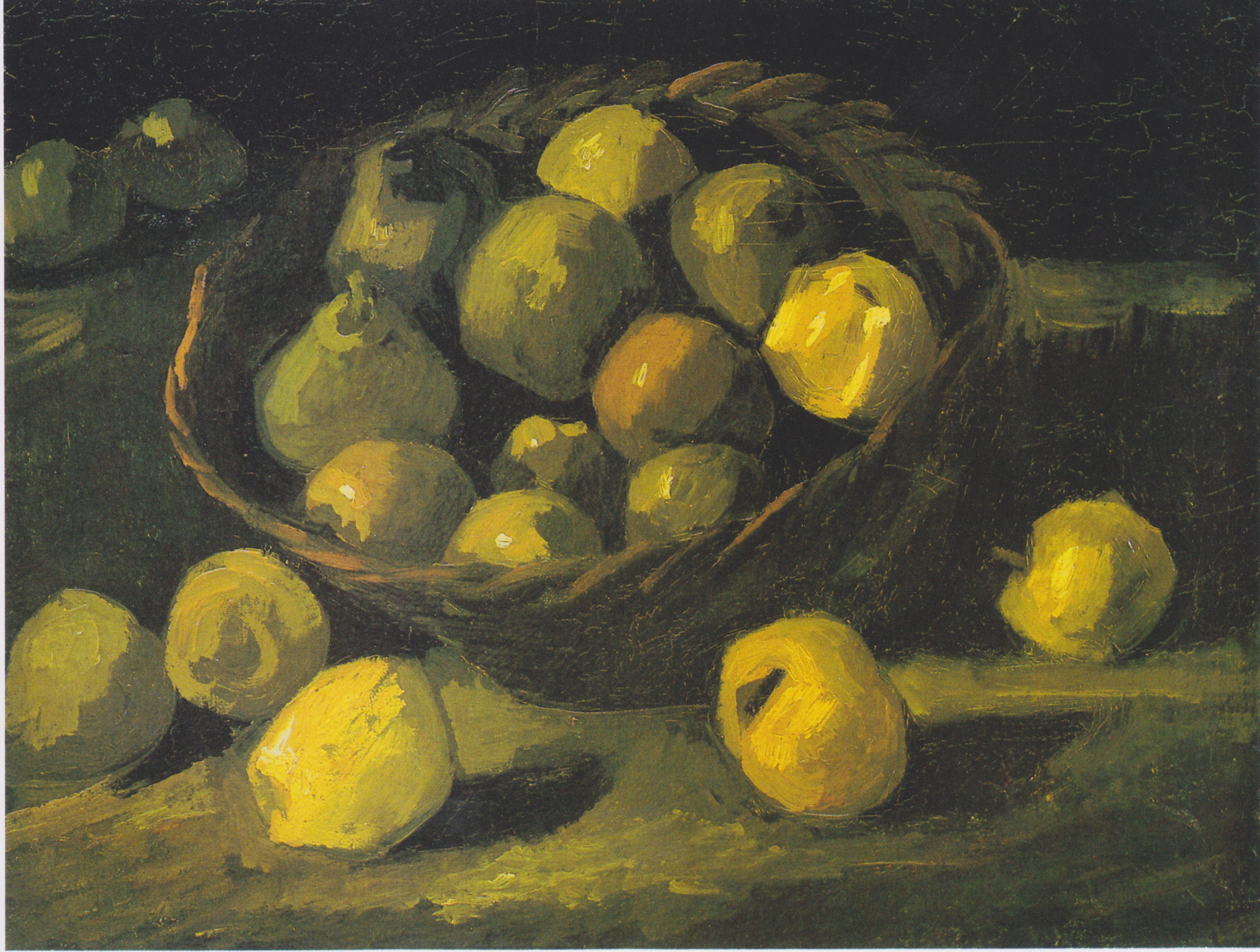
Basket of Apples, 1885, Van Gogh Museum, Amsterdam (F101)

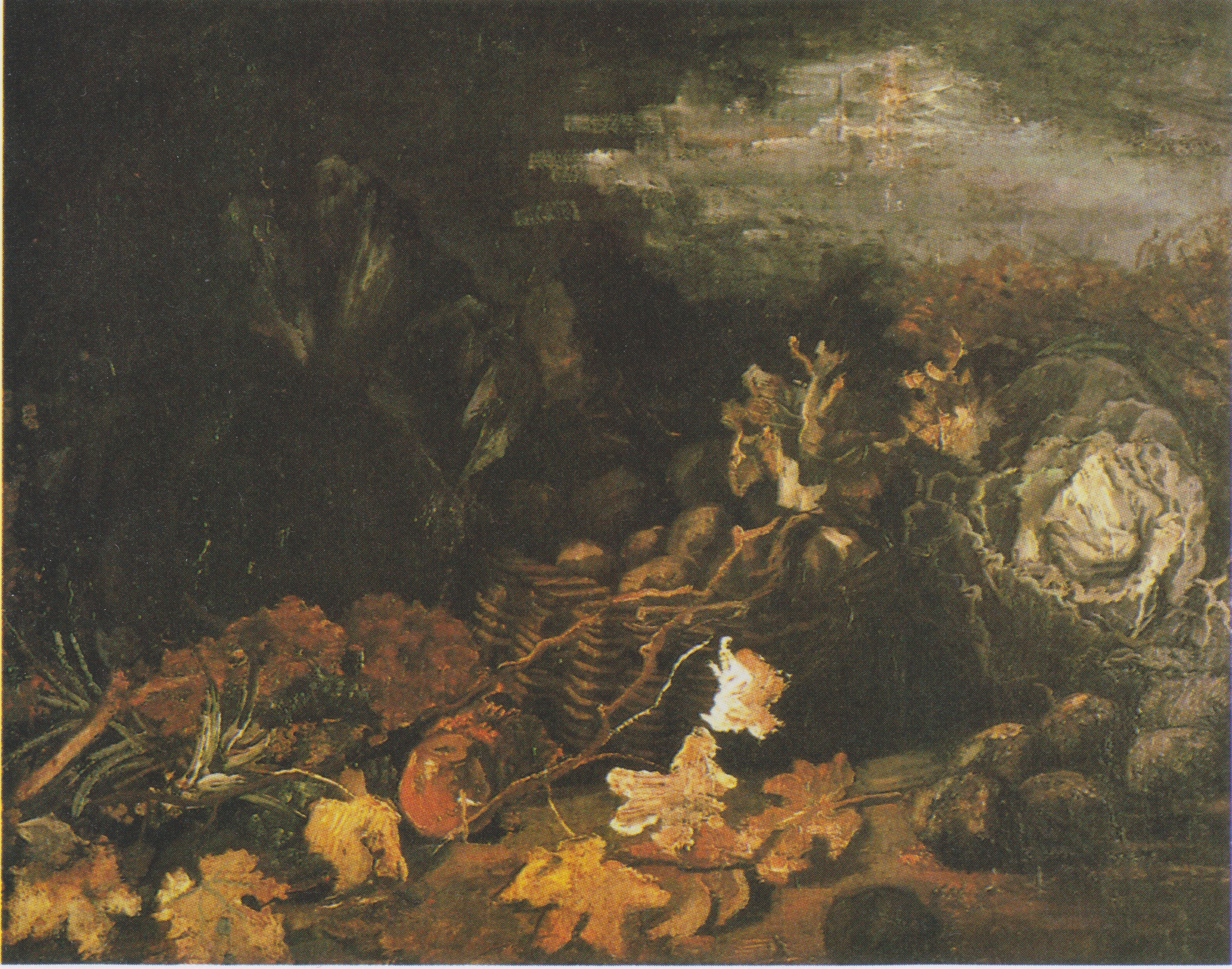
Still Life with a Basket of Potatoes, Surrounded by Autumn Leaves and Vegetables, 1885, Private collection (F102)

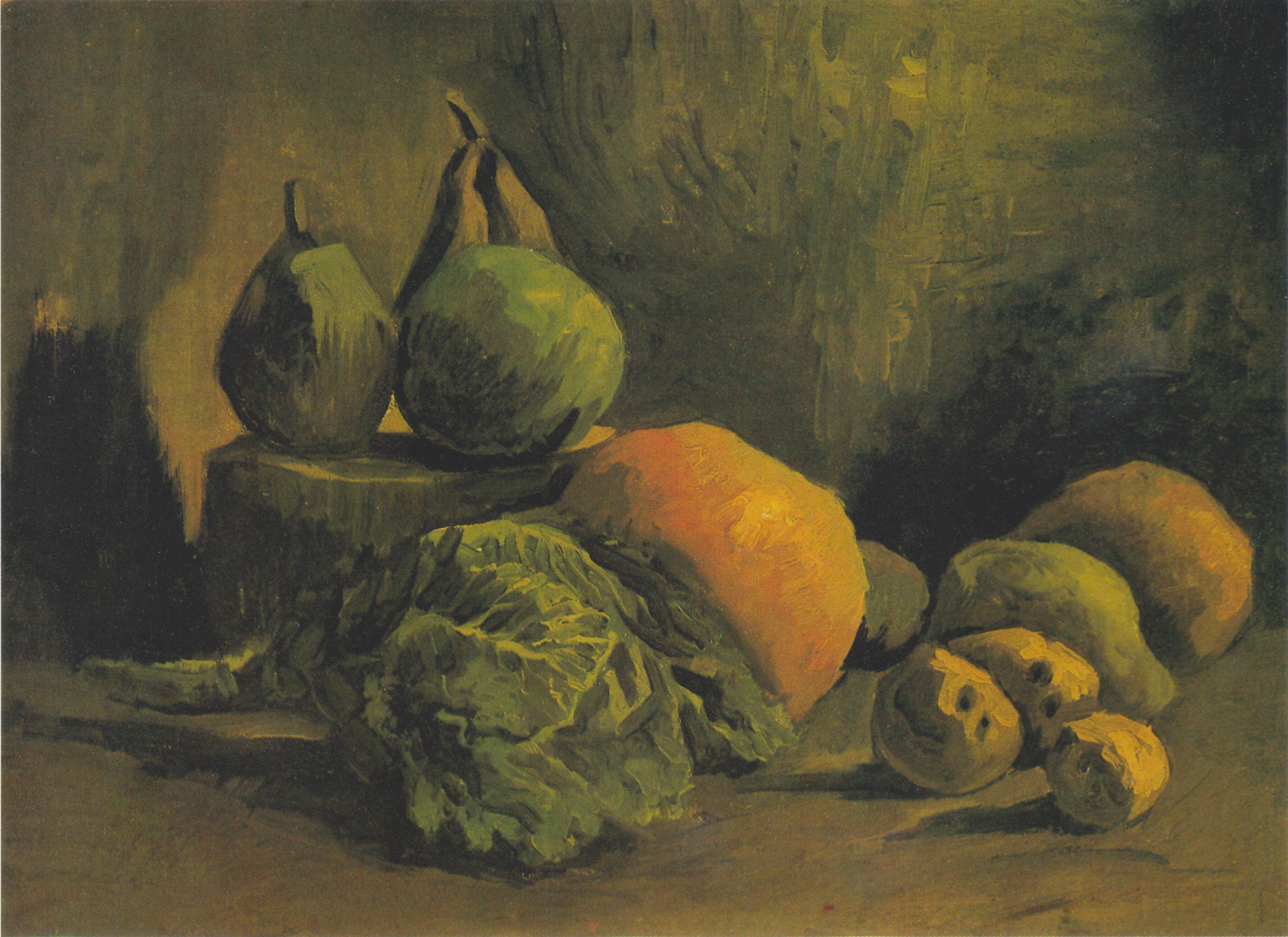
Still Life with Vegetables and Fruit, 1885, Van Gogh Museum, Amsterdam (F103)

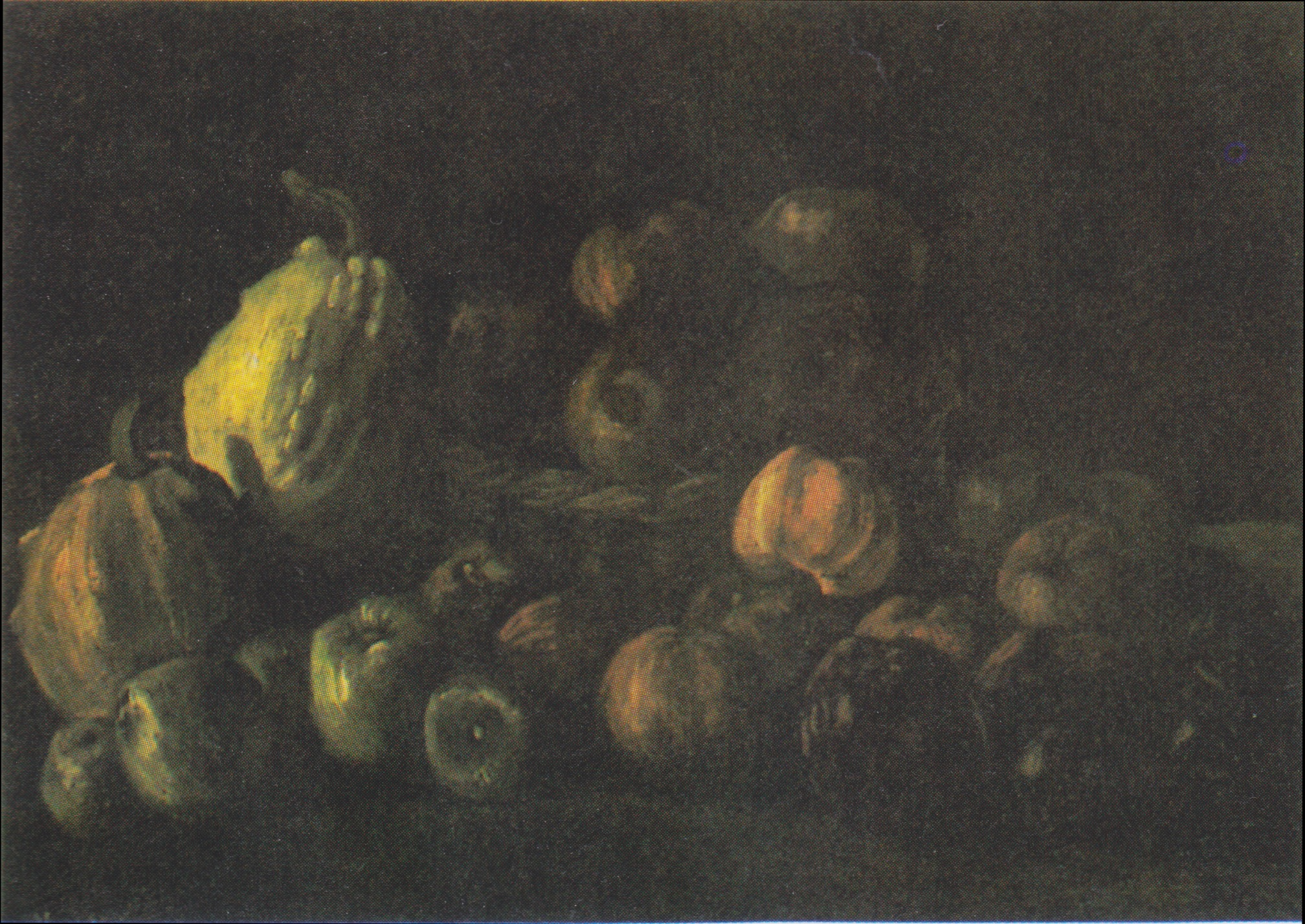
Still Life with a Basket of Apples and Two Pumpkins, 1885, Kröller-Müller Museum, Otterlo, Netherlands (F106)

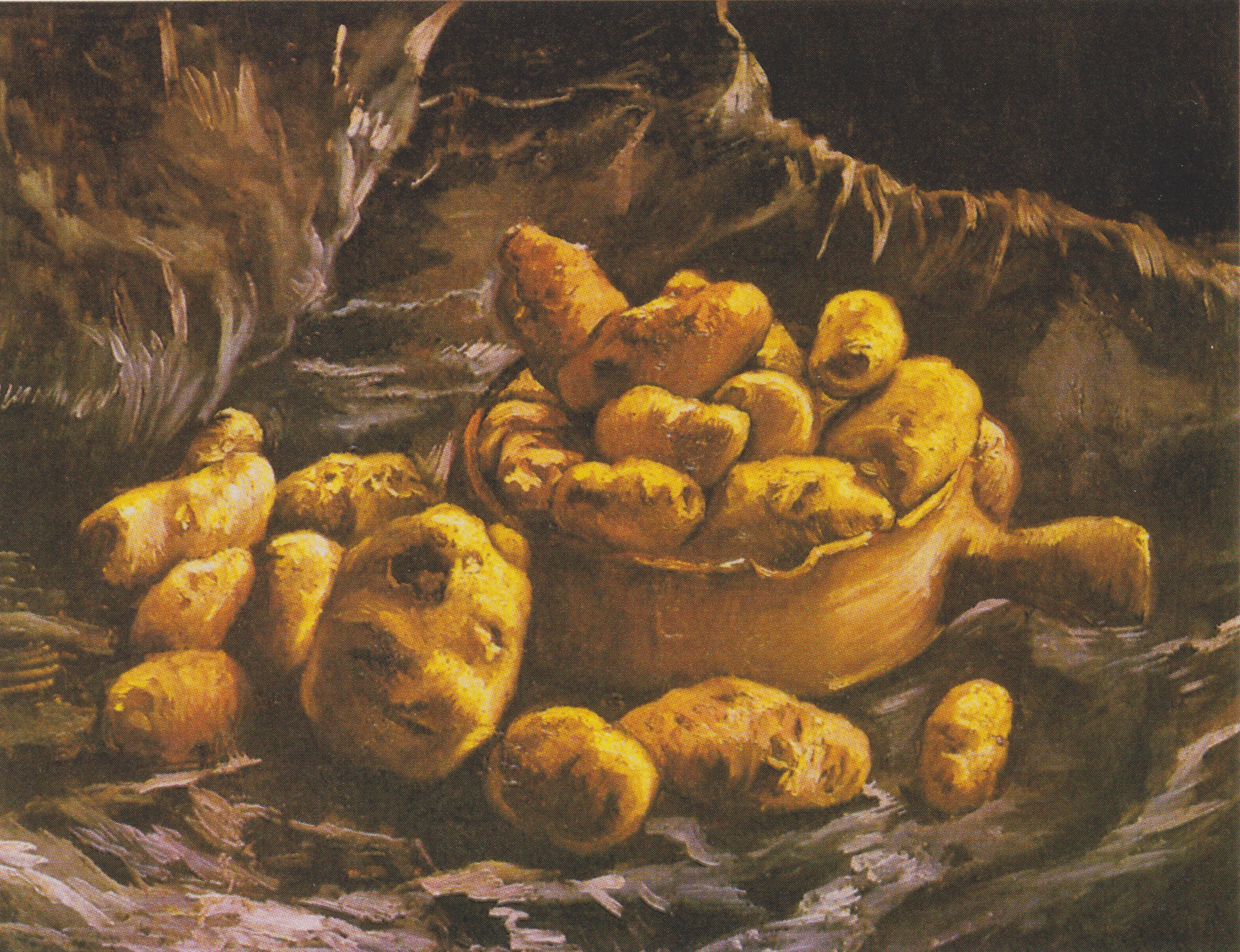
Still Life with an Earthen Bowl and Potatoes, 1885, Museum Boijmans-van Beuningen, Rotterdam (on loan) (F118)

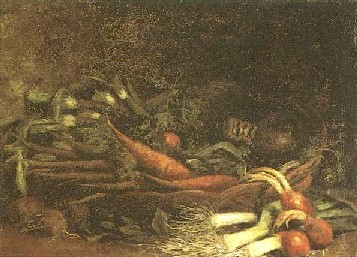
Still Life with a Basket of Vegetables, 1885, Collection Anneliese Brand, Landsberg/Lech (F212a)

== Vases ==
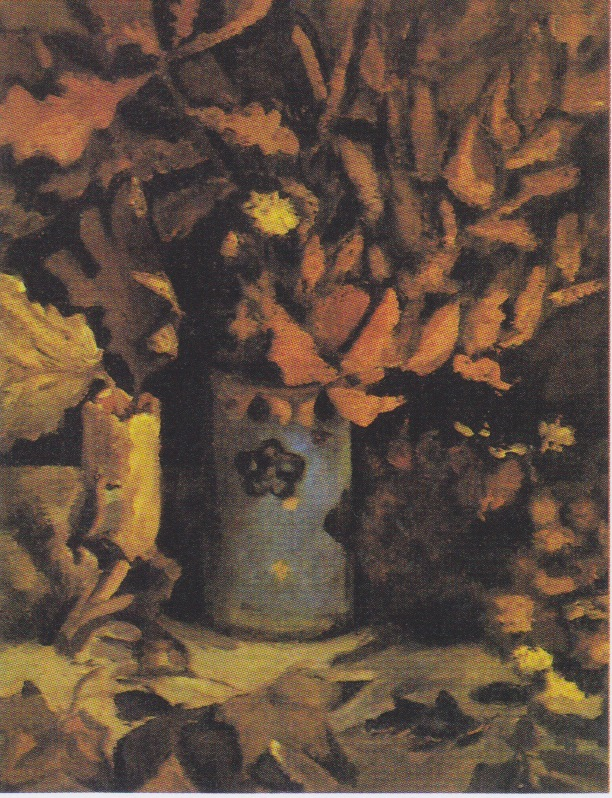
Vase with Dead Leaves, 1884, Private collection (F200)

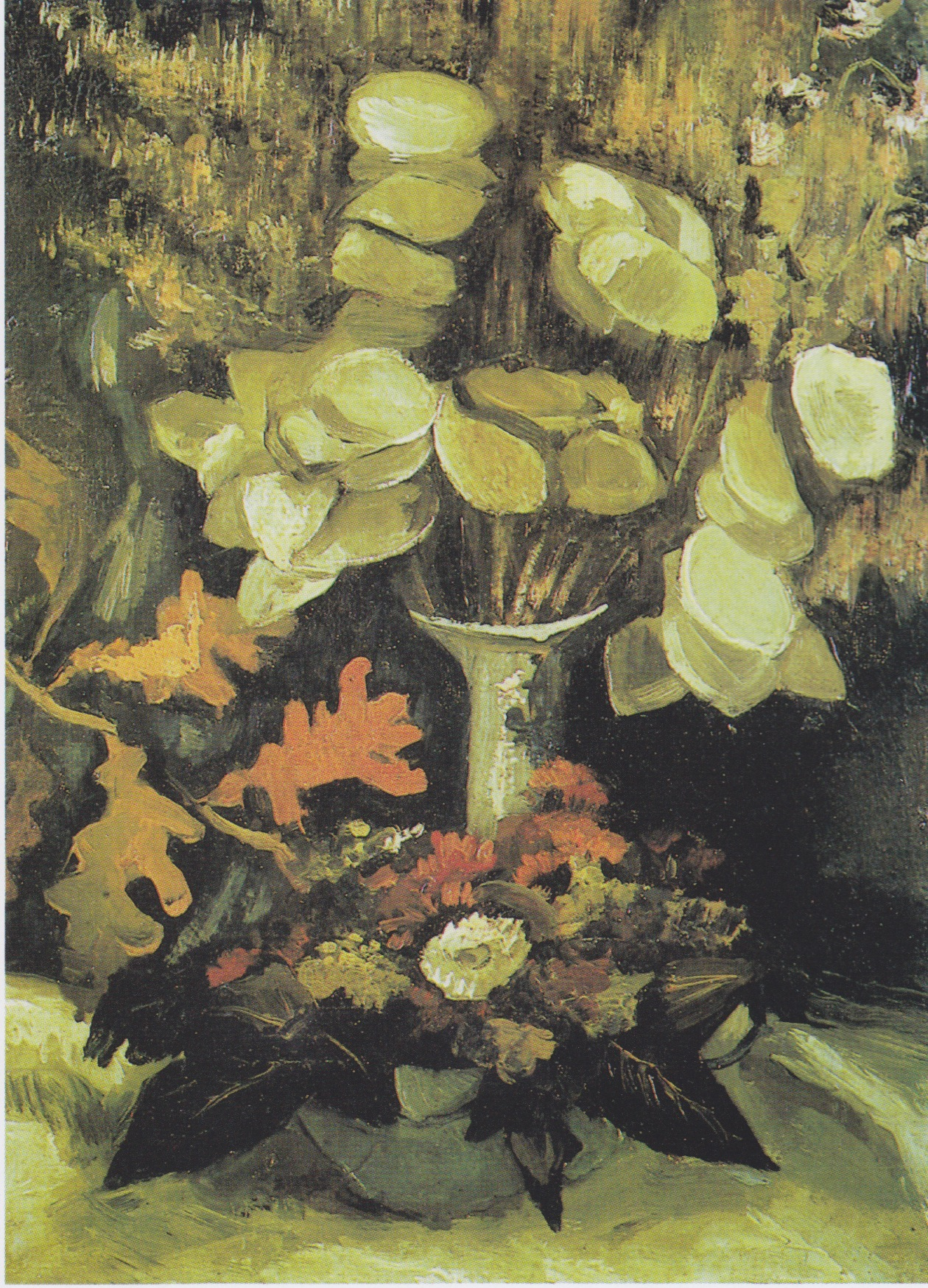
Vase with Honesty, 1884–85, Van Gogh Museum, Amsterdam (F76)

== Bird's nests ==
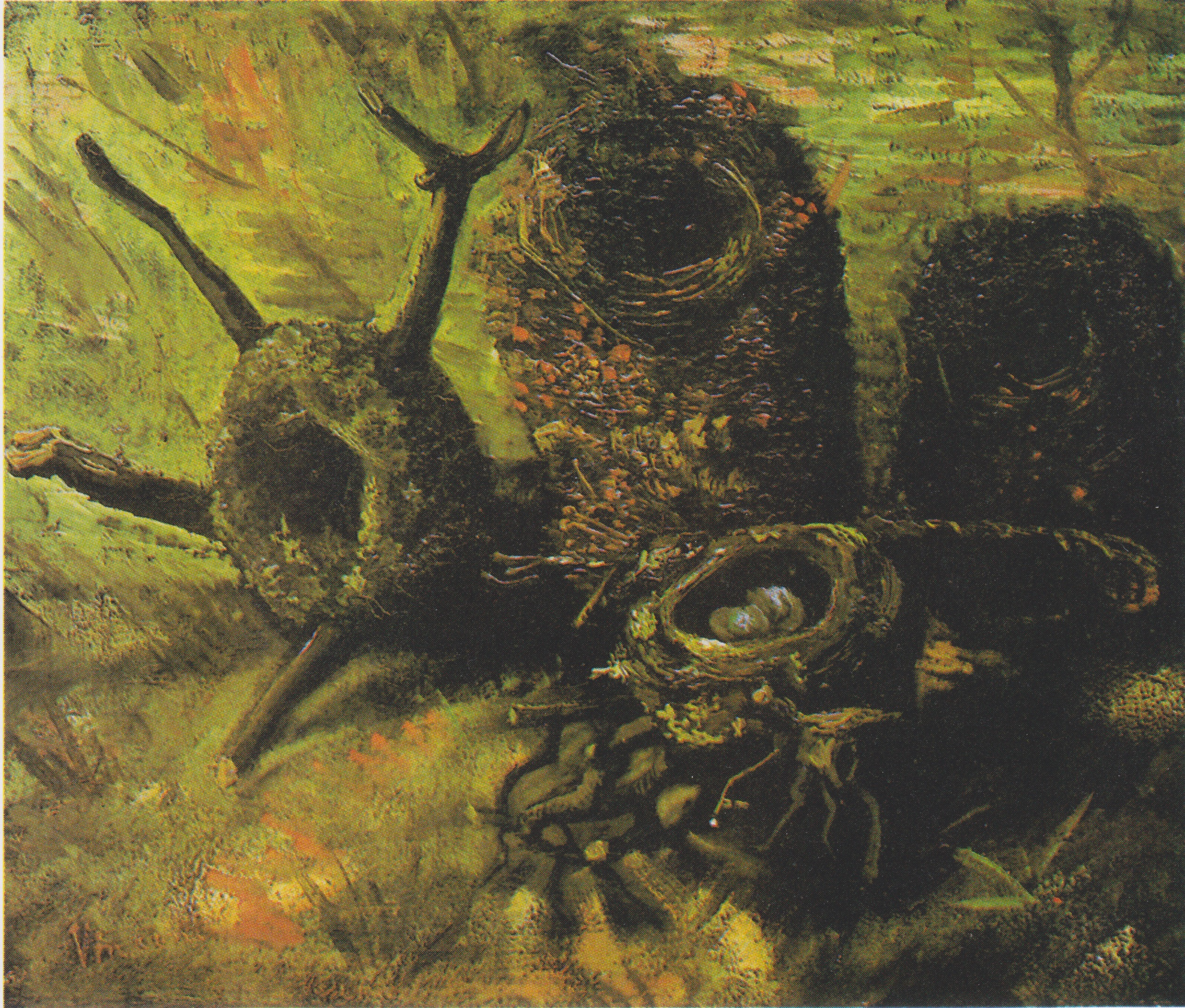
Still Life with Birds' Nests, 1885, Van Gogh Museum, Amsterdam (F111)

Van Gogh painted five paintings of birds' nests in October 1885. According to van Gogh's friend Anton Kerssemakers, he had "no less than 30 different birds' nests" in his studio, collected from his walks or purchased from children for roughly 10 cents per nest. For the more elaborate nests, such as the two ball-shaped wrens' nests in the top right of the Still Life with Birds' Nests (F111) painting, van Gogh would pay more. The Van Gogh Museum comments: "The relatively light foreground and background of the canvas was probably applied a couple of years later. By then Van Gogh had come into contact with the bright colors of the Impressionists during his time in Paris, and he seems to have found the dark background too somber."

Early September 1885, Van Gogh wrote: "I am now busy painting still lifes of my birds' nests, four of which are finished; I think some people who are good observers of nature might like them because of the colors of the moss, the dry leaves and the grasses." With a Bird's Nest sketch (Sketch F425, JH 943), van Gogh commented in the same letter of his tender feelings for nests of birds and people: "When winter comes (when I have more time for it) I shall make more drawings of this kind of thing. La nichée et les nids [the nestlings and the nests], I feel deeply for them – especially people's nests, those huts on the heath and their inhabitants."

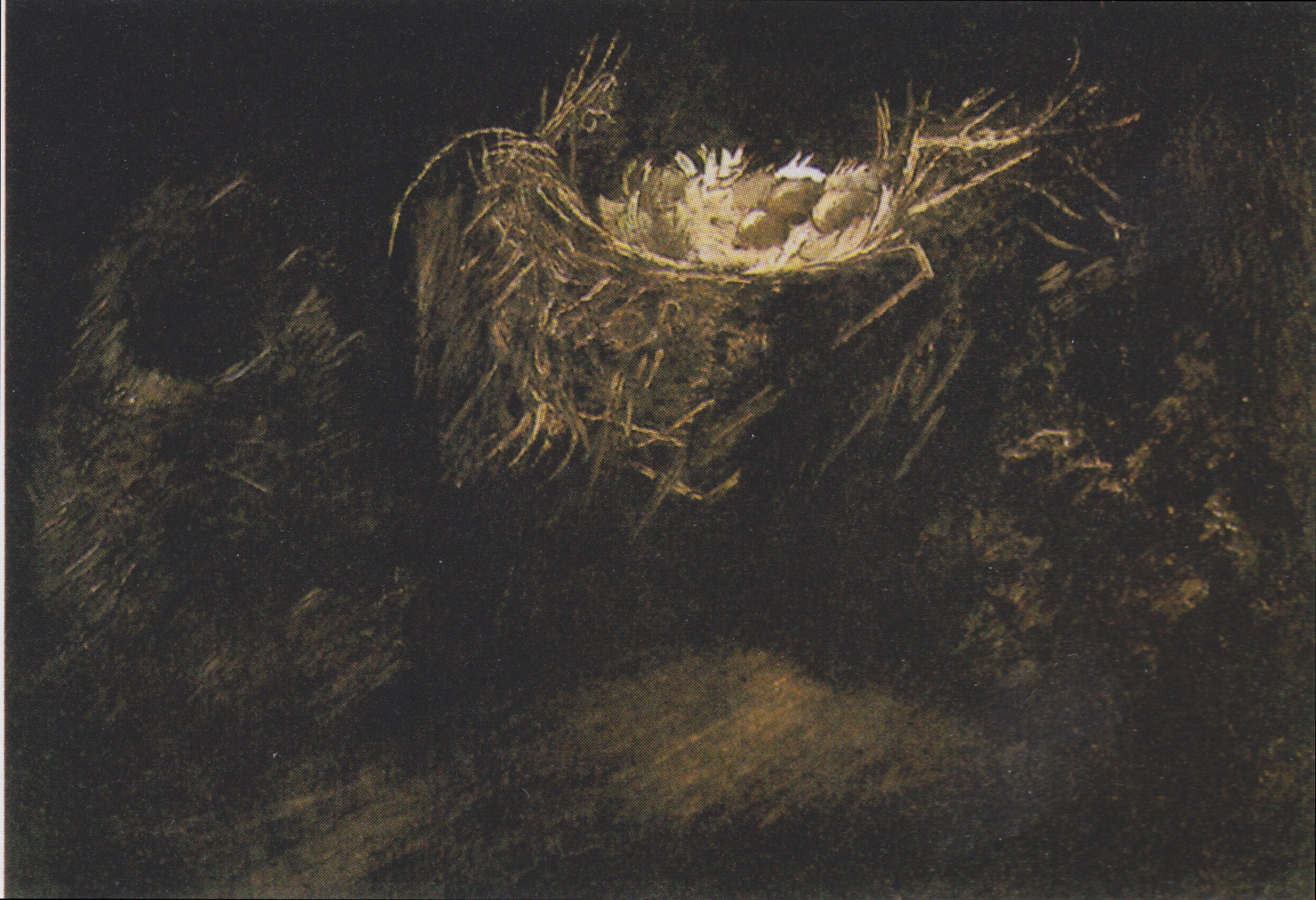
Still Life with Three Birds' Nests, 1885, Kröller-Müller Museum, Otterlo, Netherlands (F108)

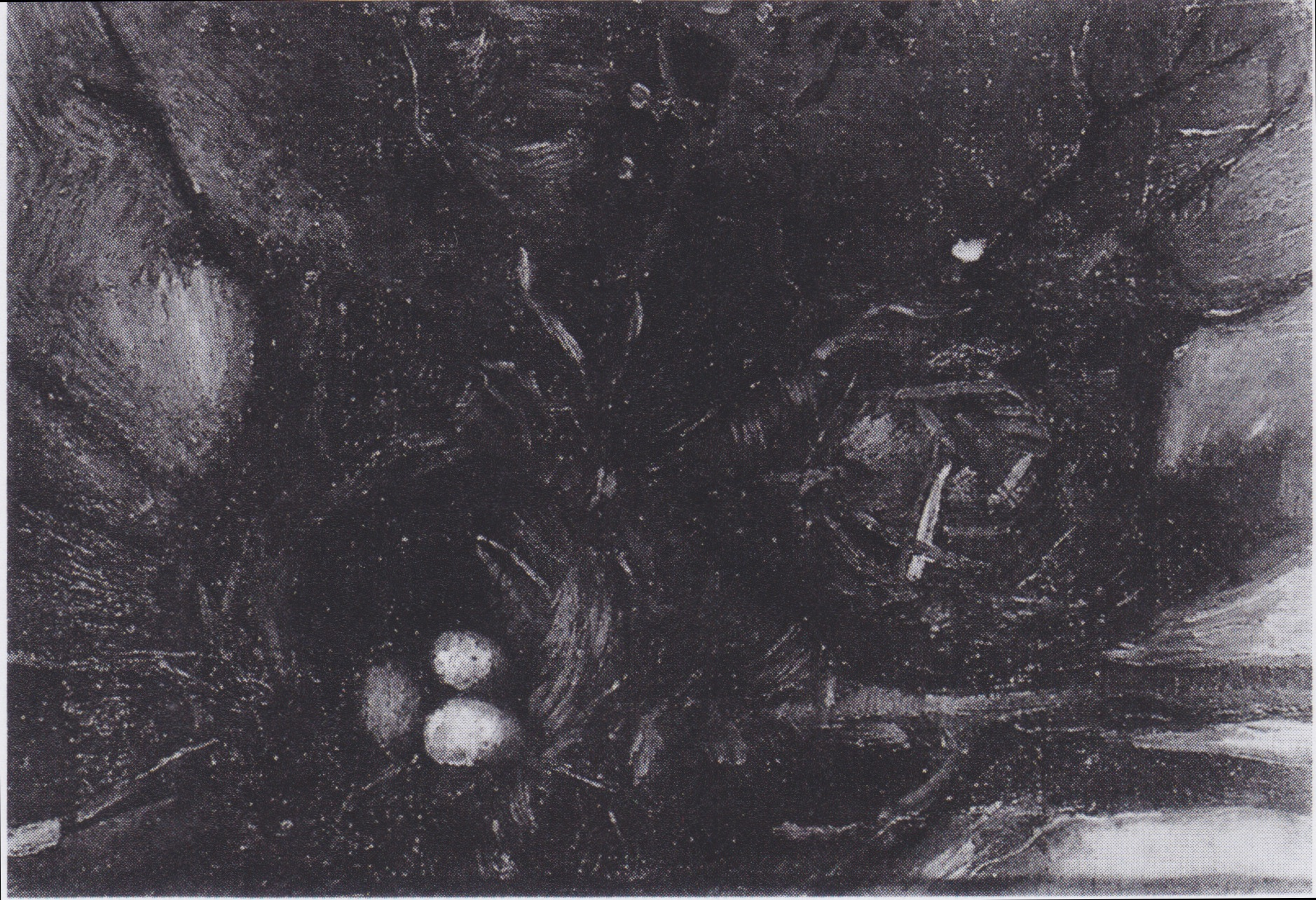
Still Life with Birds' Nests, 1885, Van Gogh Museum, Amsterdam (F109r)

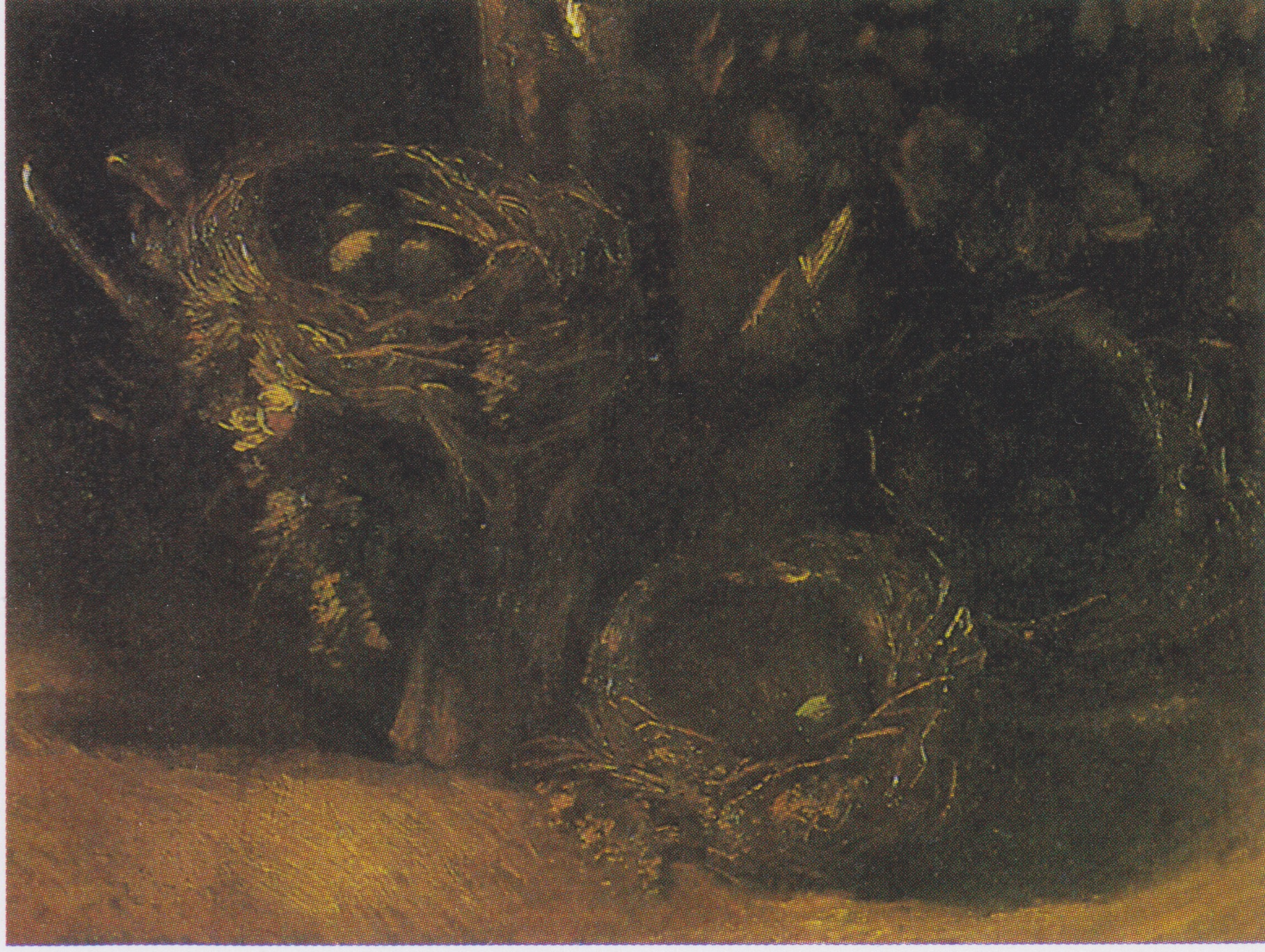
Still Life with Three Birds' Nests, 1885, Gemeentemuseum Den Haag, Netherlands (on loan) (F110)

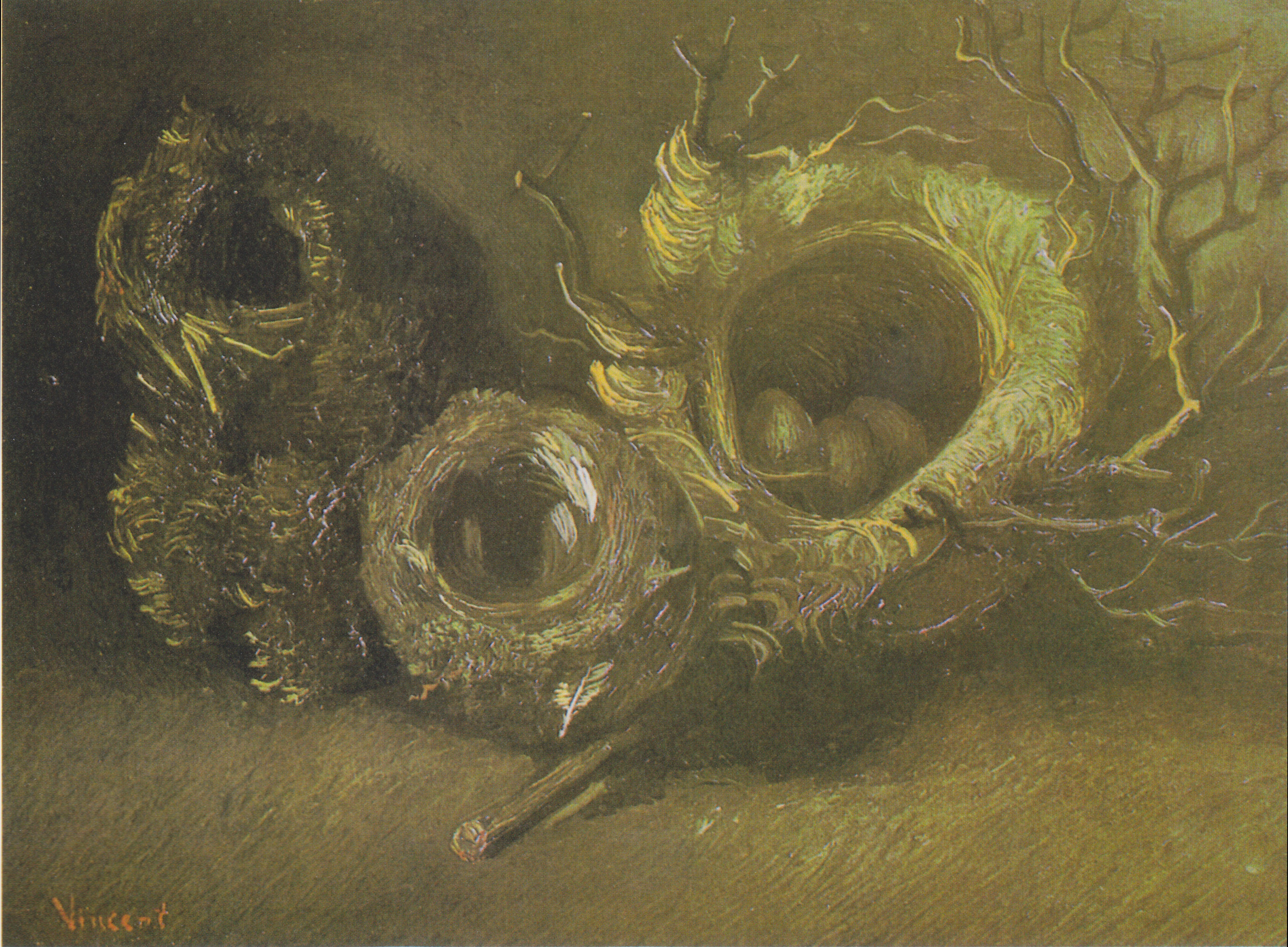
Still Life with Three Birds' Nests, 1885, Kröller-Müller Museum, Otterlo, Netherlands (F112)

== Personal items ==
Vincent van Gogh made a painting of his father's Dutch Authorized Bible in Still Life with Bible (F117) months after his father, Theodorus' sudden death in March 1885. The Bible symbolizes his father's faith, which Van Gogh felt was too conventional and made for a strict view of life. Isaiah 53 is the passage identified on the open page, which foretells the coming of the Messiah who will not be recognized. Representing himself is Émile Zola's novel La Joie de vivre (English: The Joy of Living), which van Gogh saw as a "Bible for modern life", placing it next to his father's Bible in the painting. The burned out candle could symbolize van Gogh's father's death or it could represent Vincent's disenchantment with traditional faith.

Still-Life with Straw Hat and another painting of this period, Still-life with Earthen Pot and Clogs, are regarded by critics and writers for their technical mastery. Both are characterized by smooth, meticulous brushwork and fine shading of colors.

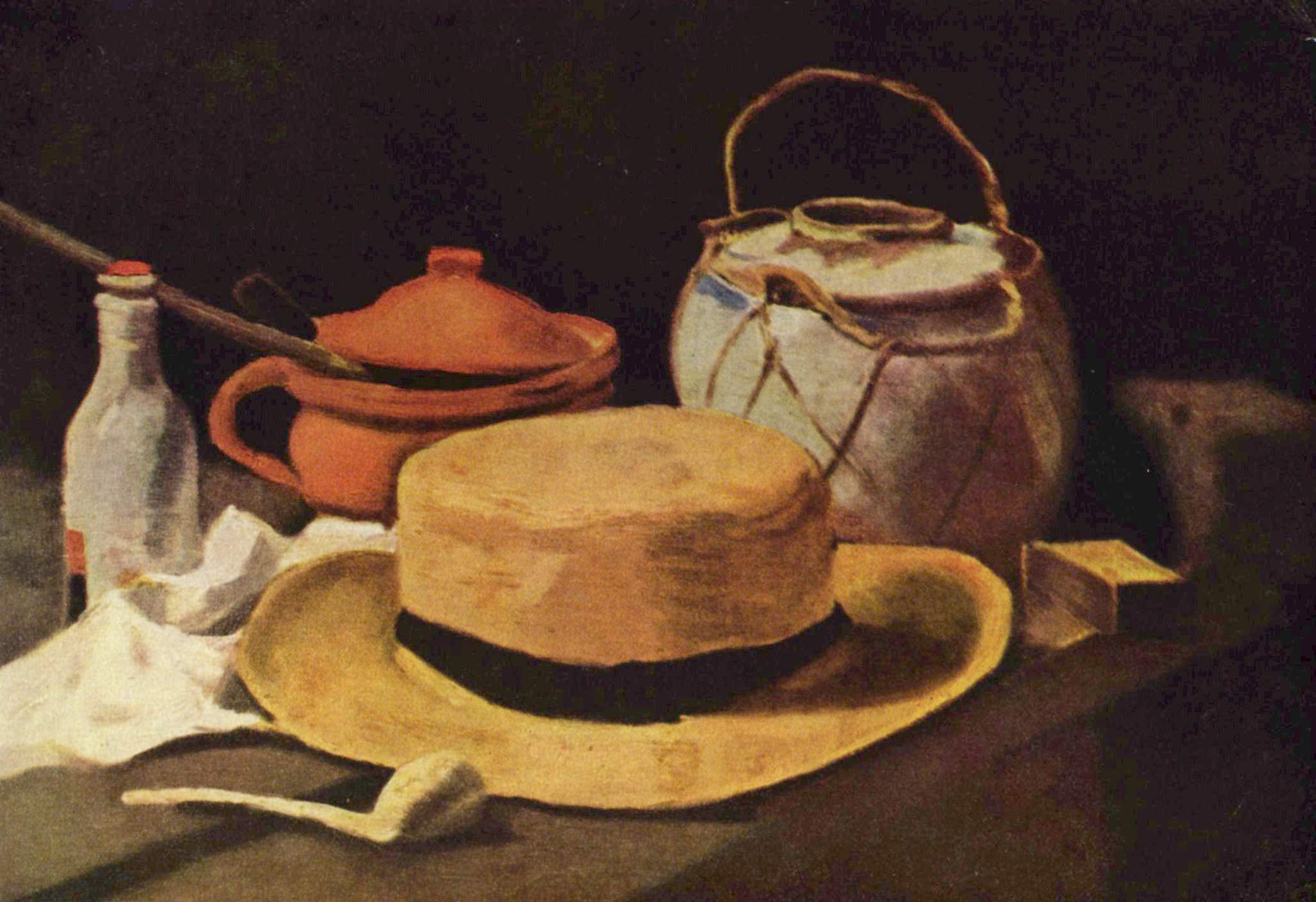
Still Life with Straw Hat also Still Life with Yellow Straw Hat, 1881-1885, Kröller-Müller Museum, Otterlo (F62)

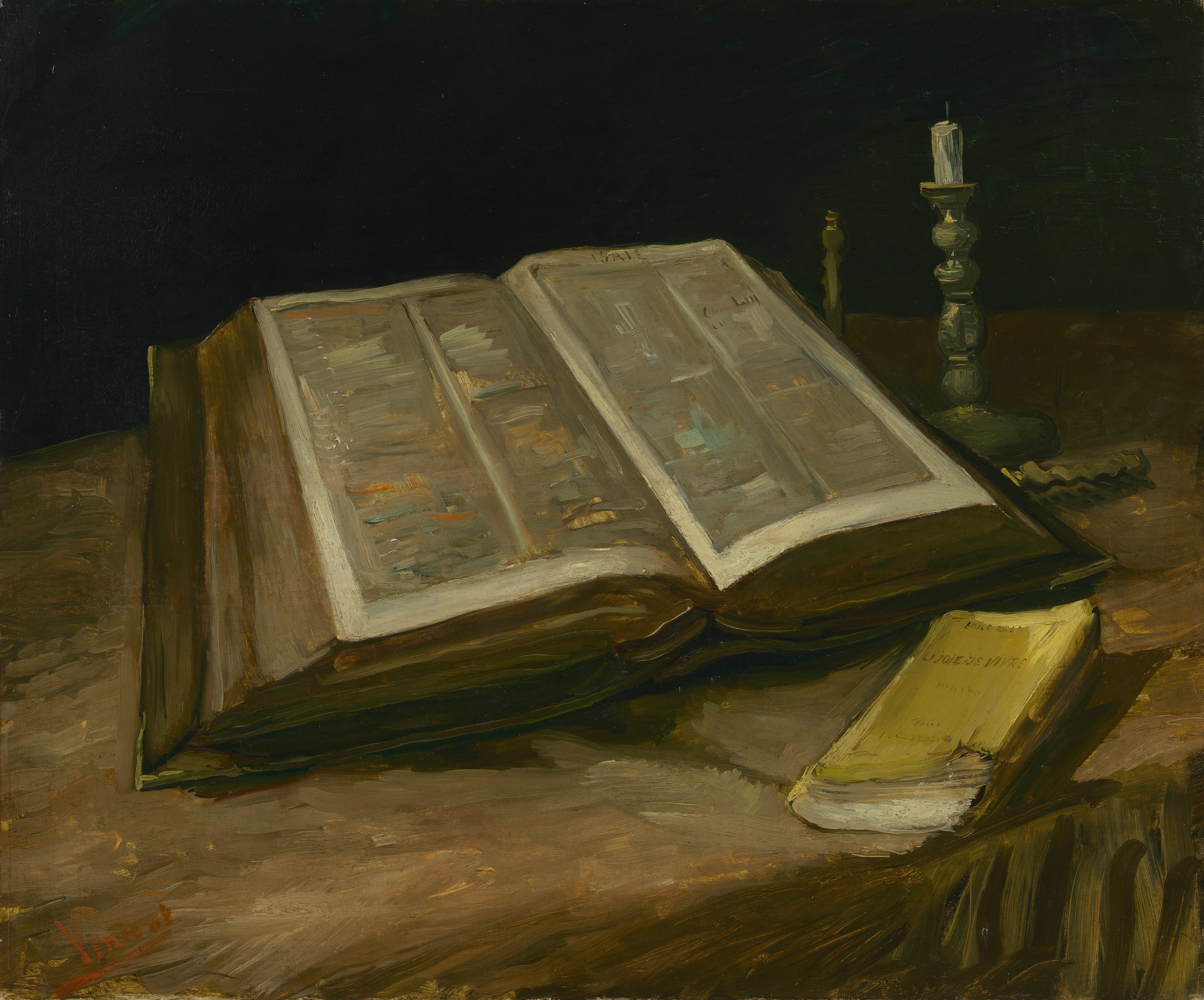
Still Life with Open Bible, Extinguished Candle and Novel also Still Life with Bible, 1885, Van Gogh Museum, Amsterdam, Netherlands (F117)

== See also ==
- Early works of Vincent van Gogh
- List of works by Vincent van Gogh
- Still life paintings by Vincent van Gogh (Paris)
