= Still Life with Straw Hat =

Painting by Vincent van Gogh

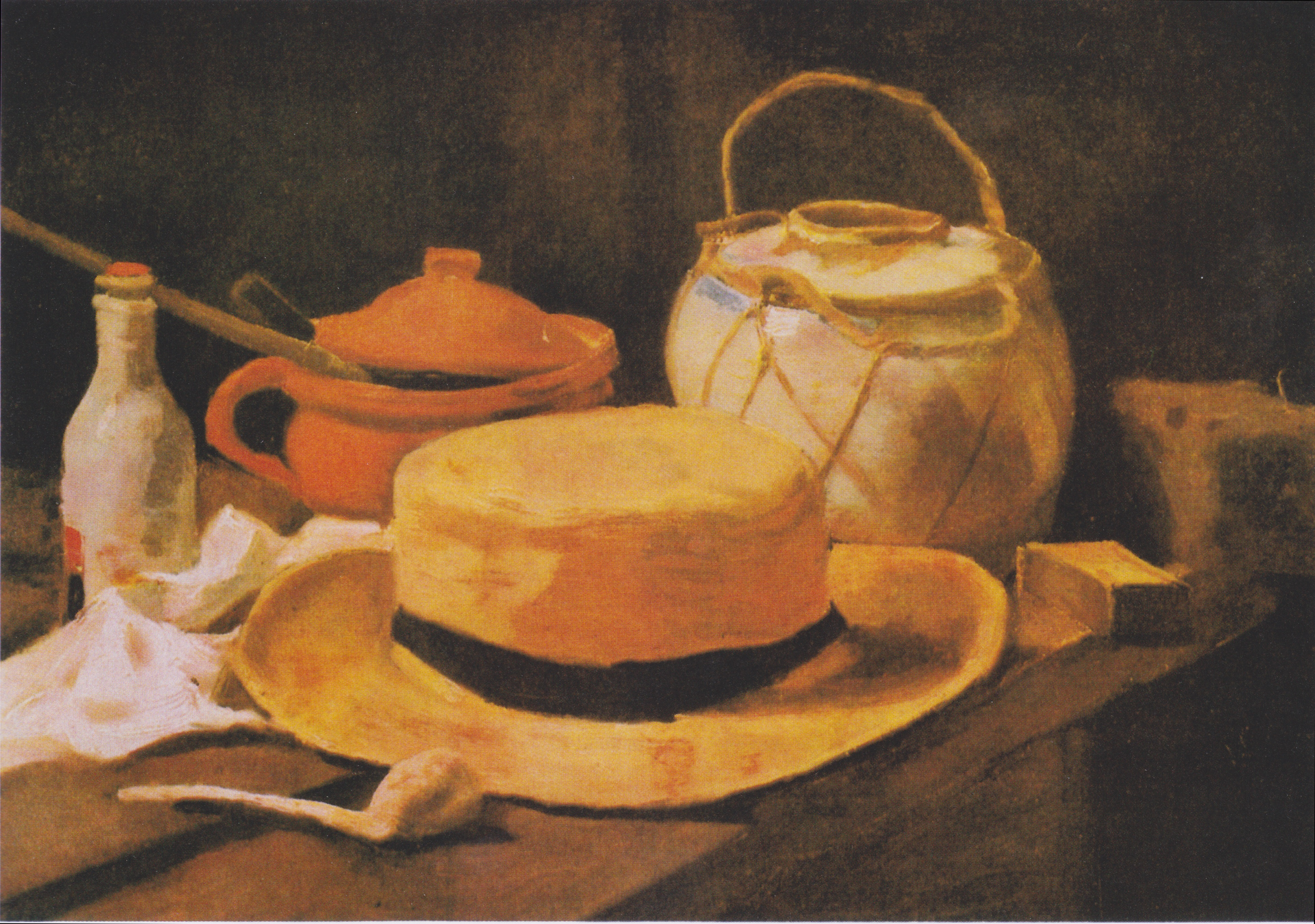
- Artist: Vincent van Gogh
- Year: c. late November – mid-December 1881–1885
- Catalogue: F62; JH922
- Type: oil on paper mounted on canvas
- Dimensions: 36.8 cm × 53.3 cm (14.5 in × 21.0 in)
- Location: Kröller-Müller Museum; Otterlo, Netherlands

Still Life with Straw Hat (Stillleben mit gelbem Strohhut) also known as Still Life with Yellow Straw Hat and Still Life with Hat and Pipe was painted by Vincent van Gogh in late November – mid-December 1881 or possibly in 1885 in the town of Nuenen.

== Van Gogh in Nuenen ==
In November 1884 van Gogh taught some friends from Eindhoven, a large town near Nuenen, to paint inanimate objects in oil. Van Gogh, in his enthusiasm, created a series of still life paintings of bottles, bowls and pots and other objects. Still Life with Straw Hat was painted at Nuenen during this period. He wrote that the paintings would be hard to sell, but having deemed the effort valuable he painted still life compositions throughout the winter.

== The painting ==
Still-Life with Straw Hat and another painting of this period, Still-life with Earthen Pot and Clogs, are regarded by critics and writers for their technical mastery. Both are characterized by smooth, meticulous brushwork and fine shading of colors. During his two-year stay in Nuenen, he completed numerous drawings and watercolors and nearly 200 oil paintings. However, his palette consisted mainly of sombre earth tones, particularly dark brown, and he showed no sign of developing the vivid coloration that distinguishes his later, best known work. When he complained that Theo was not making enough effort to sell his paintings in Paris, Theo replied that they were too dark and not in line with the current style of bright Impressionist paintings.

The painting is part of the Kröller-Müller Museum collection in Otterlo, Netherlands

== Provenance ==
Helene, wife of Anton Kröller, spent her life and fortune collecting van Gogh paintings. The Kröller's art collection of the 19th and 20th century went to the Dutch state and the Kröller-Müller Museum. It may be that the arrangement was more a means of restitution for the millions of guilders paid by the Dutch state in the 1930s to maintain solvency a bank, one of Anton Kröller corporation's largest clients, and in the process shield Kröller.

== See also ==
- List of works by Vincent van Gogh
- Still life paintings by Vincent van Gogh (Netherlands)
