= Kleine Dommel =

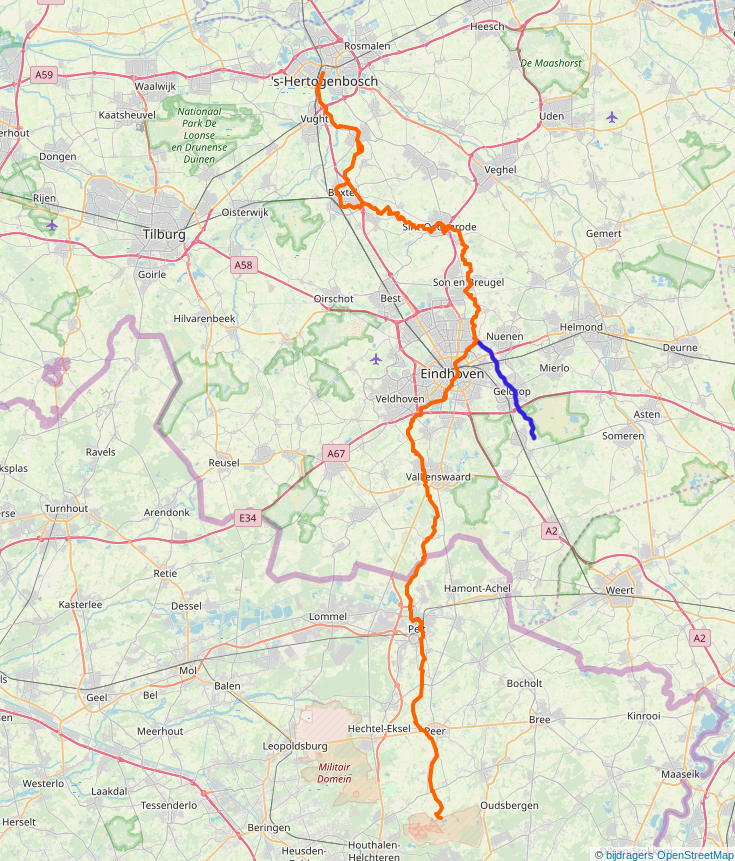
- Kleine Dommel in blue, Dommel in orange

Location
- Countries: Netherlands

Physical characteristics
- Source
  - location: Heeze Castle
  - coordinates: 51.382670°N 5.589771°E
- Mouth
  - location: Eckartdal, west of Nuenen
  - coordinates: 51.465570°N 5.514351°E
- Length: 11 km
- Basin size: 210 km^{2} (81 sq mi)
- Discharge
  - average: At the A67: 1 m^{3}/s (Summer); 3.5 m^{3}/s (Winter)

The Kleine Dommel (small Dommel) or Rul is a brook in the Campine and Meierij van 's-Hertogenbosch, Netherlands.

== History ==
=== A brook with water mills ===
The Kleine Dommel was originally a brook, meaning that it could be forded in many places. It still has three water mills. These have some renown because they were pictured by the early Vincent van Gogh, who lived in the area. In the twentieth century measures were taken to increase the discharge of the Kleine Dommel.

=== 21st century ===
The 1995 near disaster in the Dutch river delta showed the dangers of quick drainage upstream. Furthermore, climate change led to an increased number of days with extreme precipitation (>30 mm a day). In winter, when the groundwater is already close to the surface, and ditches and pounds are full, significant rains lead to an almost immediate discharge to lower areas. This is why water storage facilities were planned (and created) in many places in the Netherlands.

The water boards play a key role in these projects. For the Kleine Dommel, the responsible water board is Waterschap de Dommel. It started preparations for the temporary water storage areas in 2008. Later the plans were combined with environmental objectives, e.g. improving the close by natura 2000 reserve, and touristic objectives. In 2014 this led to the overall 'project plan Kleine Dommel Heeze Geldrop'.

== From Heeze Castle to the A67 Motorway ==
=== The valley of the Kleine Dommel ===
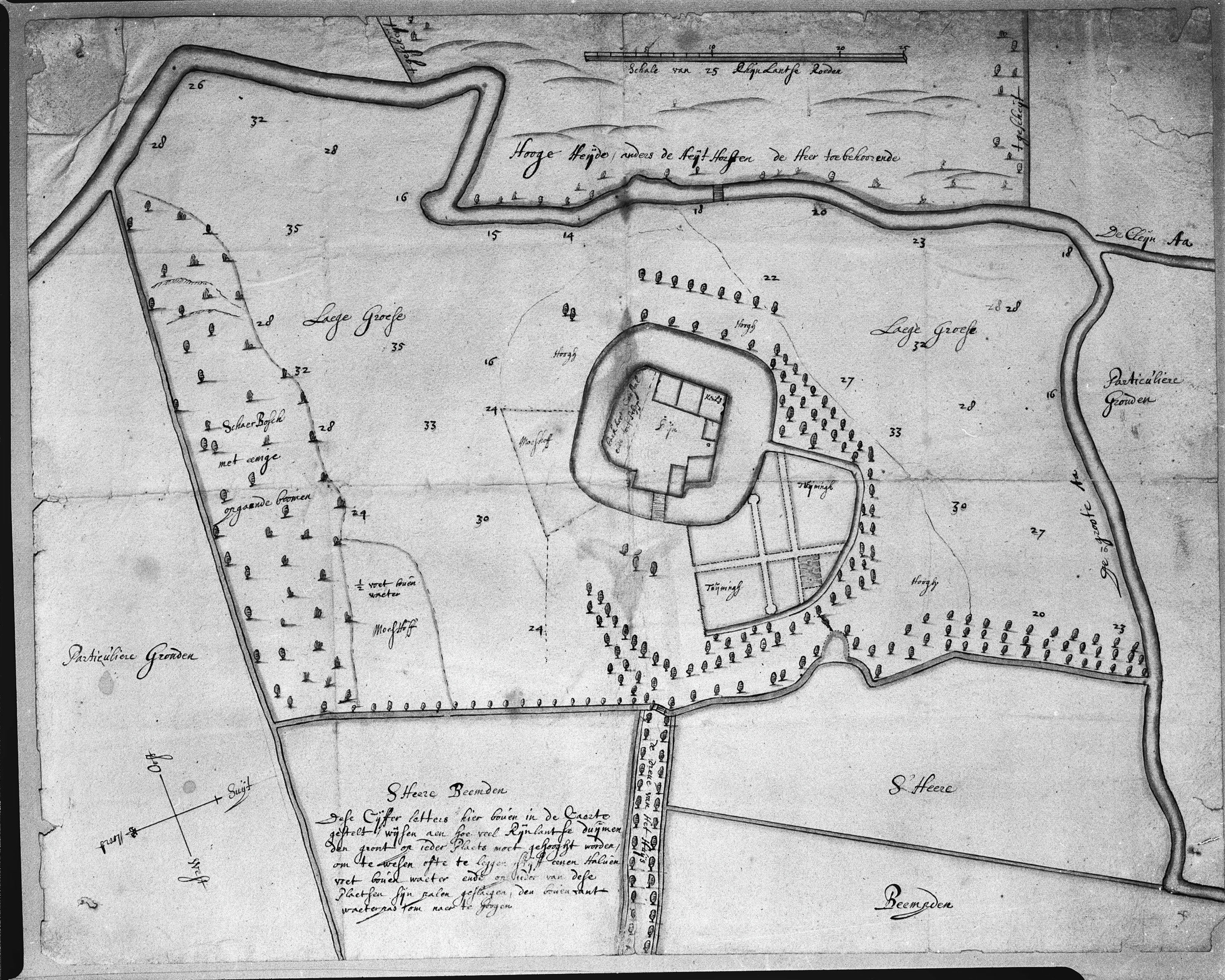
Heeze Castle c. 1662

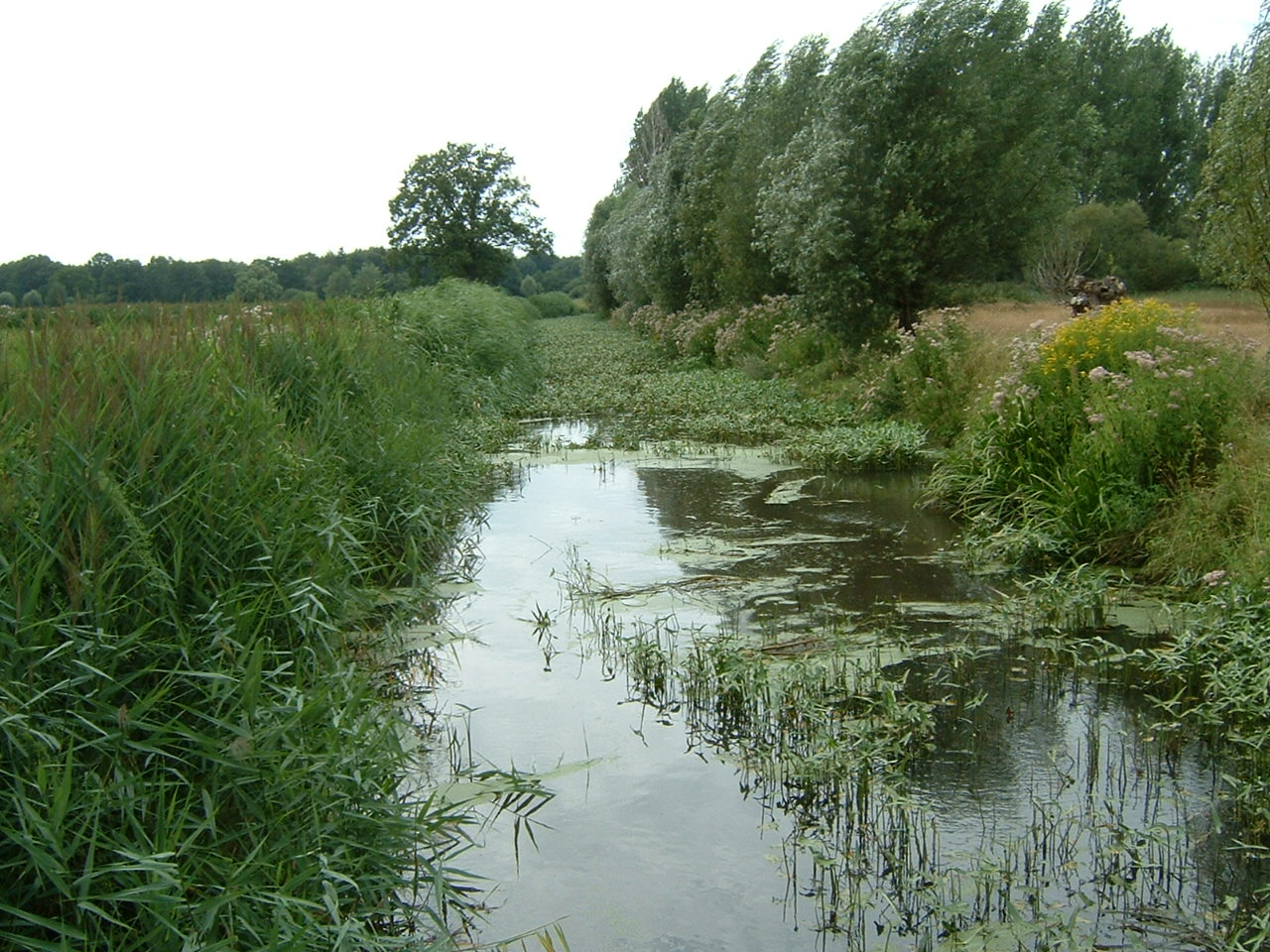
The Kleine Dommel between Heeze and Geldrop

This part of the Kleine Dommel runs from Heeze Castle in the south, to the A 67 motorway in the north. It is about 3.5 kilometers long. East of it lies the Strabrechtse Heide. On the eastern bank is also the heavily wooded and very wet nature reserve Goorse Zeggen. Both are part of the natura 2000 reserve Strabrechtse Heide & Beuven. Up to about 1900, this heath land stretched towards Nuenen in the north, and to what is now the reserve the De Groote Peel in the south.

This relatively well preserved part of the Dommel still shows a hydrological process that has mostly disappeared with the destruction of heath in the Netherlands. The hydrological process is that precipitation sinks down on the heath, and comes to the surfaces again in the (Kleine Dommel) valley. This makes the valley extremely wet, and attracts certain species. This explains the attempts to restore this process and the environment in this part of the Kleine Dommel valley.

=== From Heeze Castle to Rul ===
The Kleine Dommel starts at the confluence of the Groote Aa and Sterkselse Aa near Heeze Castle in Heeze. Originally, this was south of the castle, see the 1662 map. From Heeze Castle, the Kleine Dommel forms the western border of the Herbertusbossen (Herbertus woods) for about 500 m. Next, the Kleine Dommel has farmland on both sides. After about 200 m it crosses the road Strabrechtse Dijk, or 'Strabrecht', named for the hamlet Strabrecht. At the crossing, the long since disappeared watermill Strabrechtse Molen was mentioned in the 14th and 15th century. This part of the Kleine Dommel still has most of its original meanders.

About 300 m north of Strabrecht the Kleine Dommel meets a routing sluice, called verdeelwerk. From the verdeelwerk to the crossing of the Rul road near the hamlet Rul, about a kilometer of the Kleine Dommel was 'normalized' in the 1960s. The result was a new straight and much shorter bed of the Kleine Dommel east of the old bed. It had a deeper bed, and a much higher discharge capacity, resulting in a much slower average speed. About 60 m north of the verdeelwerk, the small drainage canal Rieloop joins this straight section of Kleine Dommel.

The old meanders of the Kleine Dommel remained visible after the new section came into use. As a measure to prevent river flooding, the old meanders of the Kleine Dommel were restored in the early 2000s. This original Kleine Dommel section then got the name 'Meander de Rul', or 'Meander Rul'. The straight Kleine Dommel retained the name Kleine Dommel. Restoring the old bed was done by building the predecessor of the verdeelwerk. This was a threshold (submerged dam) in the Kleine Dommel, which directed water into the restored bed.

The threshold did not suffice for the environmental objectives set by the 2014 plan, because Meander de Rul did not flow fast enough. Therefore, the threshold was replaced by a special sluice. It can direct all the water through Meander de Rul in Summer, while still keeping enough flow in the Kleine Dommel. It is also able to direct enough water through the bypass in order to prevent excessive flooding, which is expected to happen in some winters.

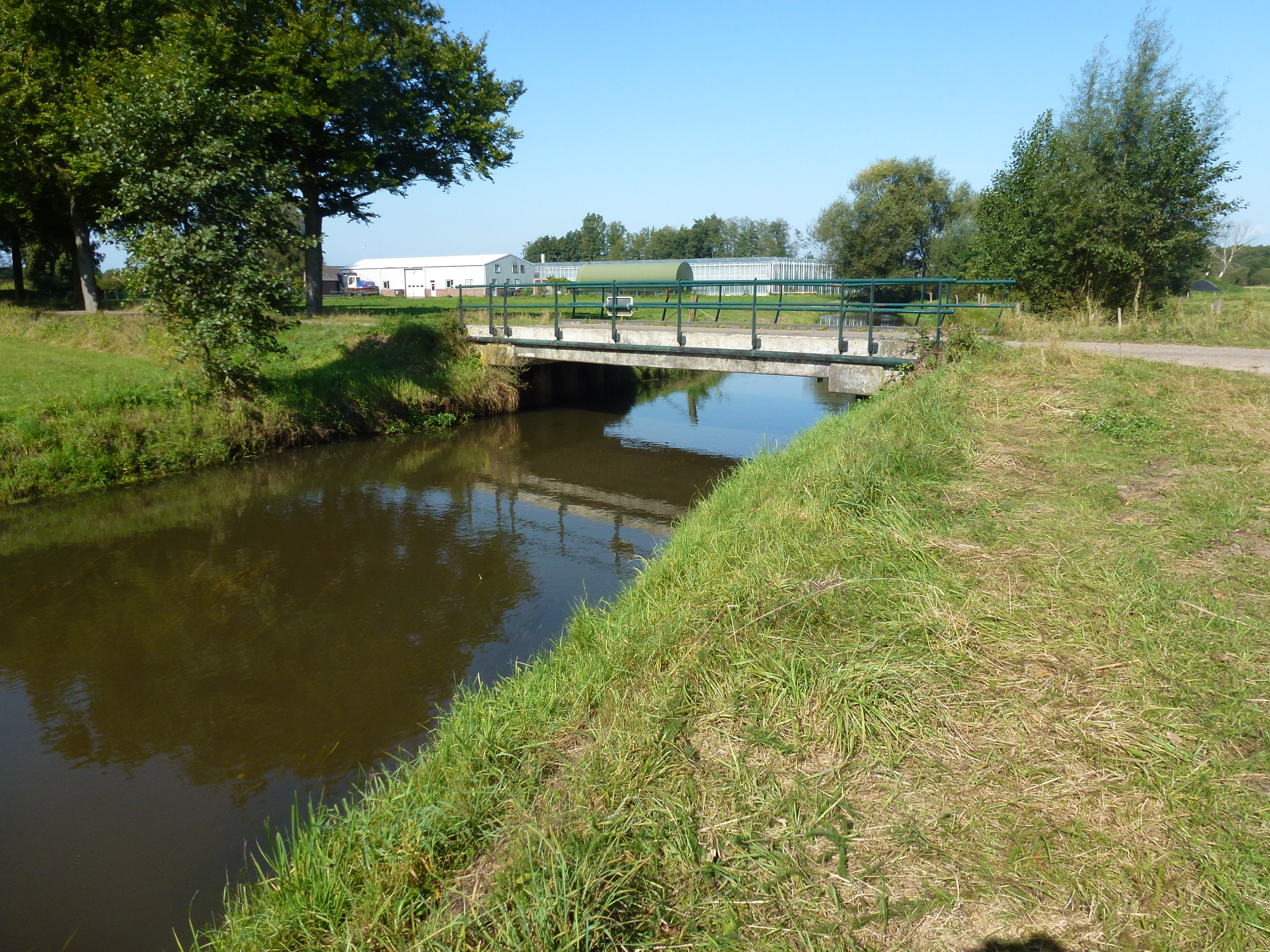
Bridge at Rul and the disappeared greenhouse

After the Kleine Dommel is reunited with Meander de Rul, it meets the road called Rul or Mierlose Dijk, named for the hamlet Rul to the west. Here was a commercial greenhouse farm, for which there was no future in the reconfigured valley of the Kleine Dommel. The owners therefore got permission to change one greenhouse to 10 apartments, and opened a new business as Rulse Hoeve recreatiewoningen. The new apartment complex was surrounded with a square dyke, part of it realized by heightening the road. This way the Rulse Hoeve will be an island when the water storage facility is used.

=== From Rul to the A 67 ===
From the Rulse Hoeve to the motorway A67, the Kleine Dommel was normalized. It meant that many meanders were cut off, but the operation was not as drastic as elsewhere. Most of this stretch of the Kleine Dommel and its valley are part of the natura 2000 reserve Strabrechtse Heide & Beuven.

The 2014 plan prescribed some measures to restore this stretch of the Kleine Dommel to a state in which it would again contribute to the environmental value of the area. It was to become narrower, and shallower, and was to flow faster. For this, the sinuosity of the brook had to be increased from 1.2 to 1.3-1.5. Meanders would be restored according to the 1900 map. A large fish ladder which had replaced a weir in 2006, was removed again.

=== The water storage facility ===
The valley of the Kleine Dommel between Heeze Castle and the motorway A67 is about 3.6 km long and 400–500 m wide. It is relatively small and deep. The valley therefore offered the opportunity to create a water storage area for about 1,500,000 m^{3} of water without having to flood a very large amount of land. The water storage facility was designed to limit flooding in Geldrop to once in 100 years. It is expected that the water storage facility will be used once every 16–25 years.

On the southern side of the A67 a dike was built. Its top is 21.00 m above Amsterdam Ordnance Datum (AOD) and 4–5 m wide. This allows the level of the water storage to reach 20.10 m AOD, without possible waves flowing over the top. The maximum height of the dyke above ground level will be 3-3.5 m.

Where the Kleine Dommel crosses the dike, there is an automated sluice. This is named regelwerk (controlling facility). It has two gates of 5 m wide each. The floor of the sluice is at 16.10 m above AOD. This is 10 cm above the river, so that sediment does not settle. The maximum height of the gates is 20.10 m above AOD. When the water level of the Kleine Dommel reaches a threshold, the gates of the sluice rise automatically. The width of two times 5 m has to do with the last resort option to close the sluice with beams. The two openings have rabbets, where beams can be inserted in emergency situations. A single 10 m wide opening would be too big to close with beams.

== From the A67 to the Dommel ==
=== Near Geldrop ===
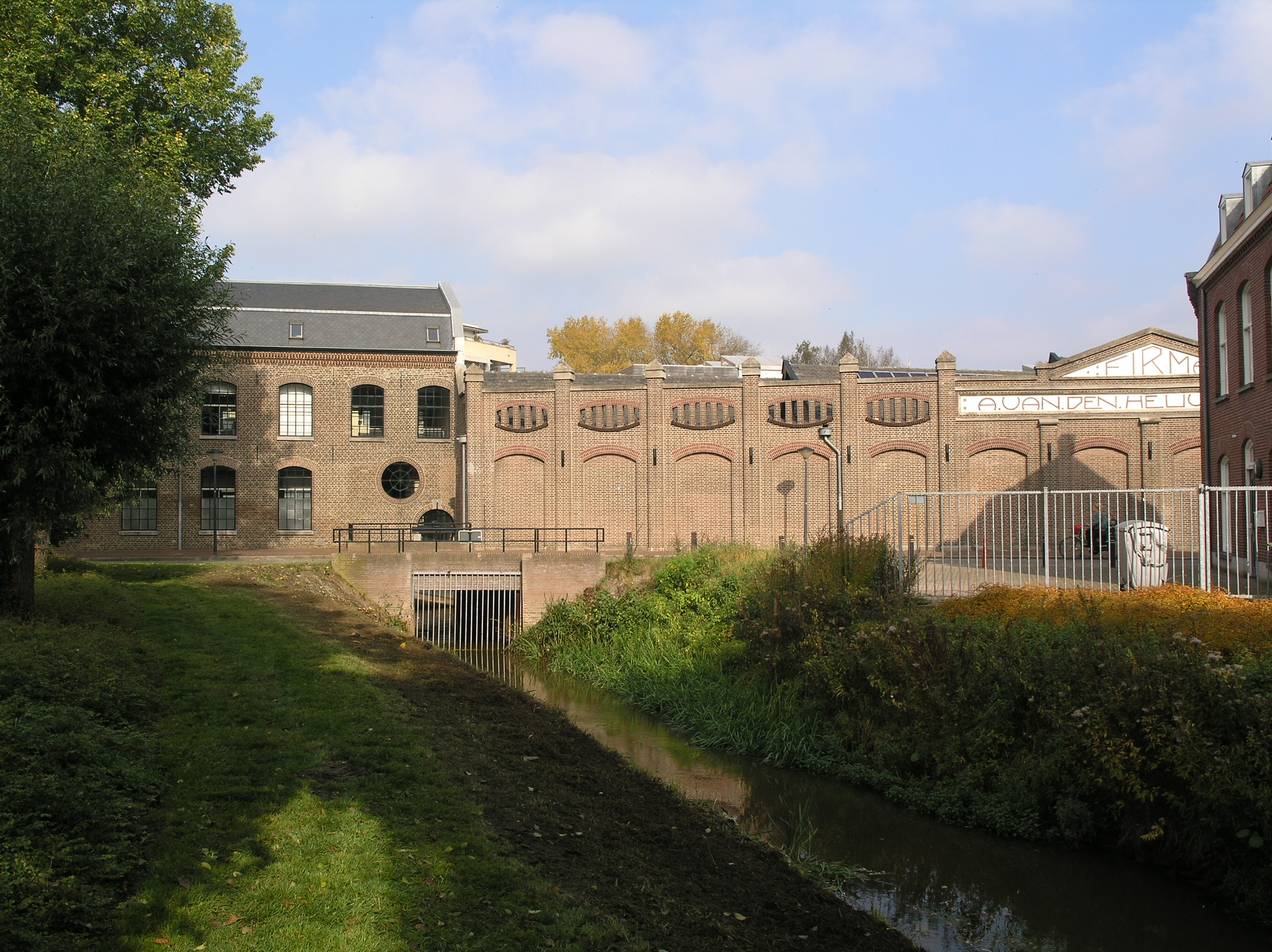
Weverijmuseum in Geldrop

The Kleine Dommel flows under the A67 by means of a culvert-bridge. On its eastern bank is a small part of the Goorse Zeggen. Towards the north, the Kleine Dommel then has Geldrop on both sides for almost the entire stretch towards the Eindhovensch Kanaal. Here the valley of the Kleine Dommel has remained relatively free of buildings and roads. Many cycle and pedestrian lanes make the valley a recreational area for the locals.

In the 1960s and 70s, the Kleine Dommel in Geldrop was straightened. In 1995 this operation was reverted by bringing the meanders back. Three kilometers of Kleine Dommel were changed, and it became a kilometer longer. This would decrease the flow rate and raise the level by 60 cm. It was expected that this would raise the ground water level by 40 cm. Most of the straight parts remained open, but were closed by low stone dams. This way, the meandering Kleine Dommel would normally discharge the water in Geldrop, but the straight parts would automatically be used during very high water levels. In March 2020 there was quite some flooding in this area. This is a natural process, and it was not enough for the waterboard to use the water storage facility.

In Geldrop itself, the Geldrop Water Mill can be traced back to at least 1403. It is now incorporated in a nineteenth century factory building. A Sagebien wheel is still in place, and is shown as part of the textile manufacturing museum weverijmuseum. It is tempting to connect the emergence of the Geldrop textile industry with the water mill. However, the Kleine Dommel did not have enough discharge to ensure continuous operation of the mill.

Just north of the center of Geldrop, the brook flows along Geldrop Castle. North of the castle is the nature reserve Hulsterbroek. Here the Beekloop, which originates between Heeze and Waalre joins the Kleine Dommel.

=== Near the Watermill of Coll ===
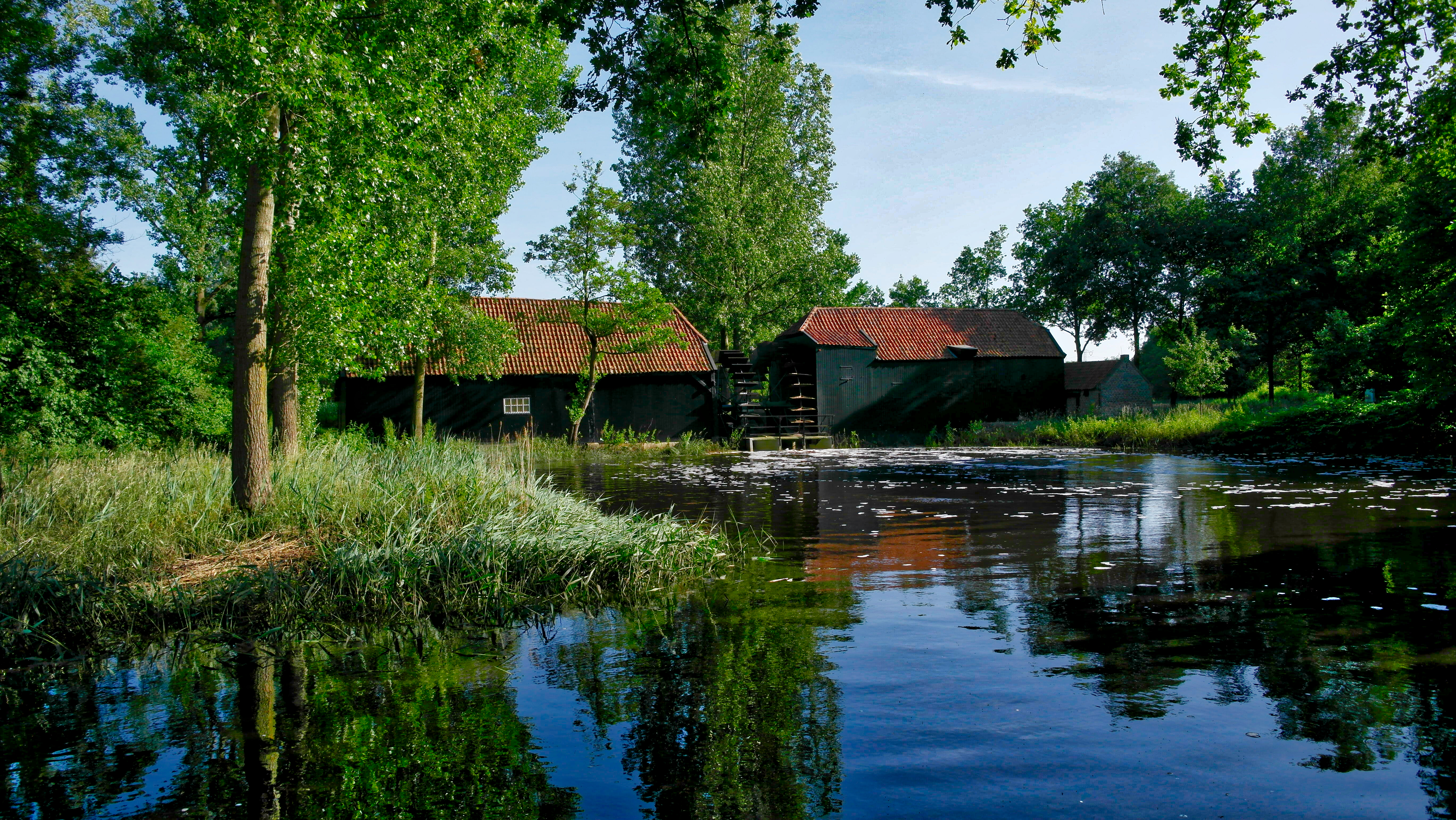
Water Mill at Kollen

The section of the Kleine Dommel from the Eindhovensch Canal to the Watermill at Kollen is a nature reserve known as Urkhovense Zeggen. This nature reserve actually consists of the Urkhovense Zeggen, Collse Zeggen, Hulsterbroek (above) and Varkensput. It totals 180 hectares, 70 of these are owned by the municipality of Eindhoven. Part of it is a type of Mesic grassland vegetation called blauwgrasland, of which only 60 hectares was left in the Netherlands in 2016. Protection started in 1970 because some species of wild orchids grow in the area.

The character of the nature reserve as a wet peatlike area was in part caused by the Watermill at 't Coll, which is located close to the hamlet Eeneind. Like most watermills, this one had a dam in the stream in order to raise the water level before the mill. This ensured a more reliable supply of water to turn the wheel and more pressure. In turn, hundreds of years of raising the water level had a profound 'peaty' effect on the area.

The painting Water Mill at Kollen Near Nuenen by Vincent van Gogh, 1884 has made the mill famous. The Noordbrabants Museum in 's-Hertogenbosch acquired it at a 2017 auction for 3,000,000 EUR. The mill itself consists of a Gristmill and an Oil mill and is still in use. In 2015 a fish ladder was built at the mill. The objective was to make it easier for some rarer fish in the Kleine Dommel to pass the mill. The plan referred to the European bitterling, gudgeon, stone loach, European river lamprey and the spined loach.

=== West of Nuenen ===
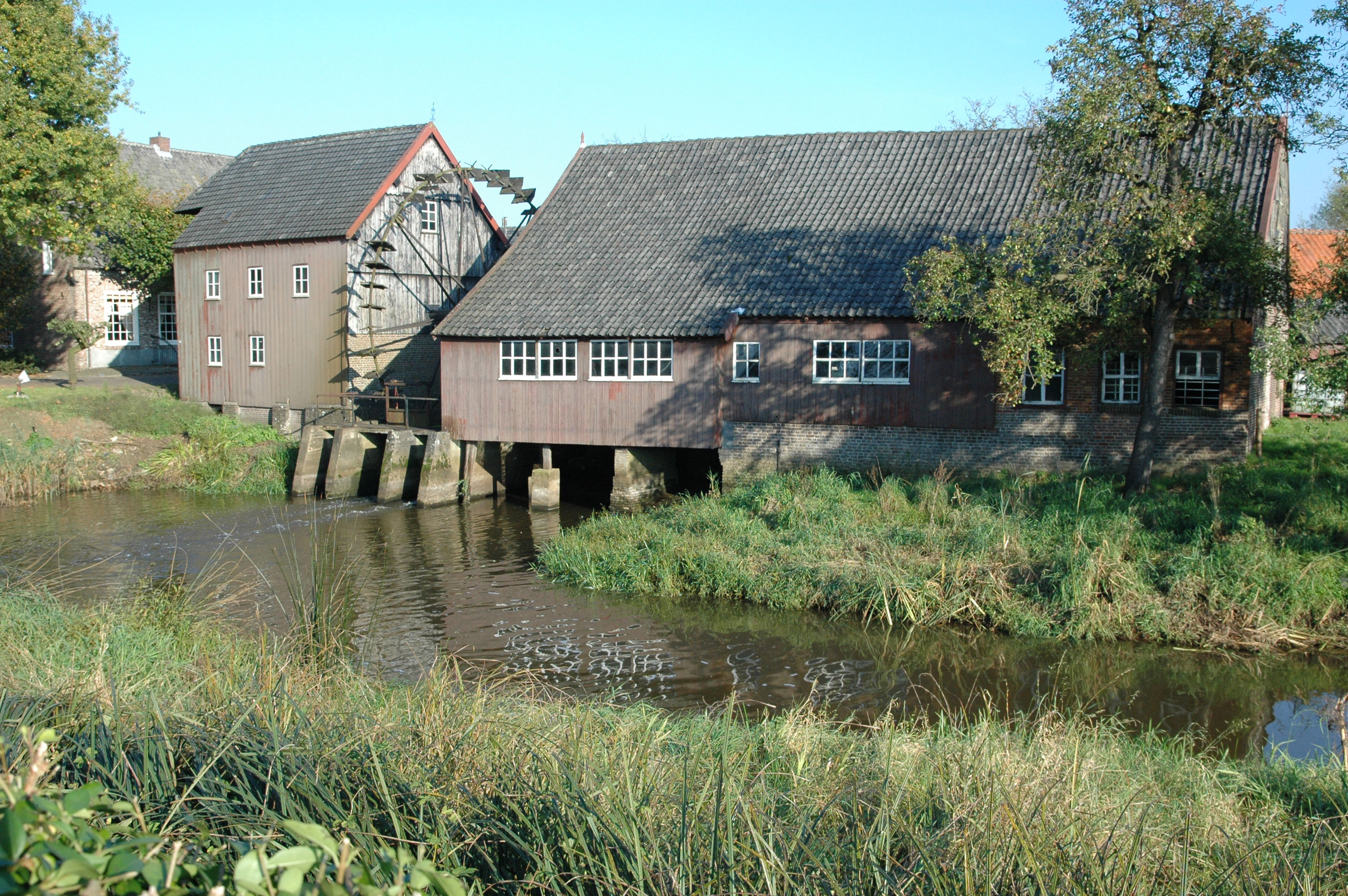
Watermill at Opwetten

The section of the Kleine Dommel west of Nuenen runs from the Venlo–Eindhoven railway to the confluence with the Dommel. Between the railway and the Watermill at Opwetten most of the sides of the Kleine Dommel have been razed for agriculture. North of the mill this is not much better. However, in general the Kleine Dommel is still in its original bed in this section.

In 2020 Waterboard de Dommel, Staatsbosbeheer, Brabants Landschap, and four municipalities started the project 'Dommeldal uit de Verf' for the area between the A67 and the Dommel at Son en Breugel. The idea is to acquire much land that is now in agricultural use. By converting it to nature, nature reserves like the Urkhovense Zeggen should be connected to other valuable areas.

The Watermill at Opwetten was painted by Van Gogh, see Water Mill at Opwetten. It has the largest water wheel in the Netherlands. The gristmill is still in functioning order, and is generally operated each Sunday. The building of the former oil and fulling mill now houses a restaurant. The mill has a rich well documented history that goes back to the 11th century. The current buildings date from the 18th century.
