= Watermill at Opwetten =

Watermill in Nuenen, Netherlands

- Opwettense watermolen
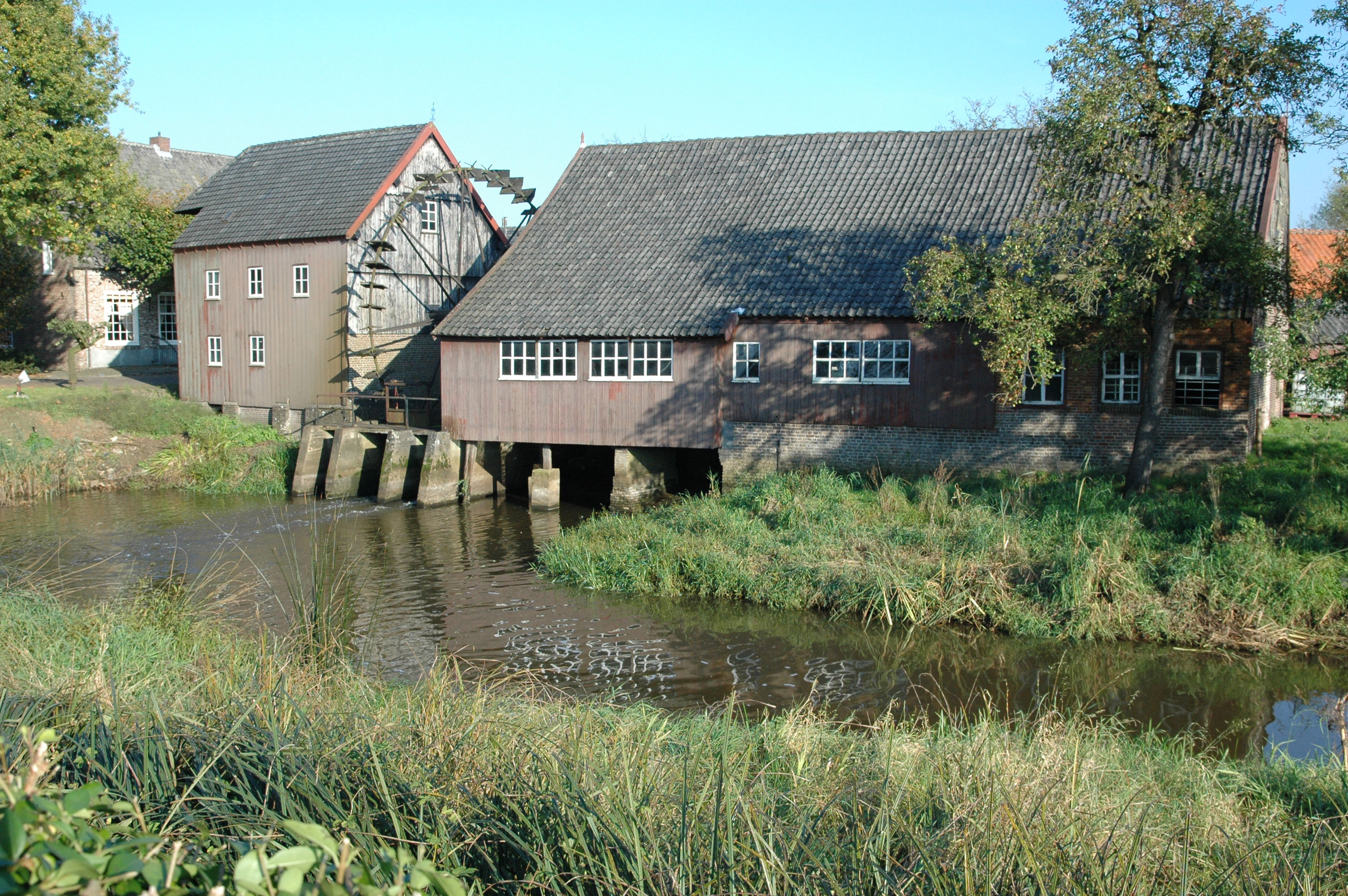
- Watermill at Opwetten in 2007

General information
- Status: Rijksmonument (30830)
- Type: Watermill
- Address: Opwettenseweg 203; 5674 AC, Opwetten
- Town or city: Nuenen, Gerwen en Nederwetten
- Country: Netherlands
- Coordinates: 51.459444°N 5.529444°E
- Completed: 1764
- Designations: Gristmill, oil mill, sawmill, fulling mill

References
- Database of Mills; De Hollandsche Molen

The Watermill at Opwetten (Dutch: Opwettense watermolen) is a watermill along the river Kleine Dommel, located on the Opwettenseweg 203 in Opwetten, Nuenen, Gerwen en Nederwetten, in the province of North Brabant, Netherlands. First mentioned in the 11th century, the watermill burned down and was rebuilt in 1764.

There have been several buildings in the watermill complex. One building was a gristmill and sawmill, while another functioned as oil mill and fulling mill. The mill operated two undershot water wheels, including the largest water wheel in the Netherlands. The gristmill is still in functioning order and is used on a small scale, the building of the former oil and fulling mill now houses a restaurant. A tannery was located in a building in the back and up to 1910 an inn was located in the miller's house. Vincent van Gogh lived nearby and made several paintings while in the area, including a painting of the mill in 1884. The watermill was listed as a national monument in 1972.

== History ==
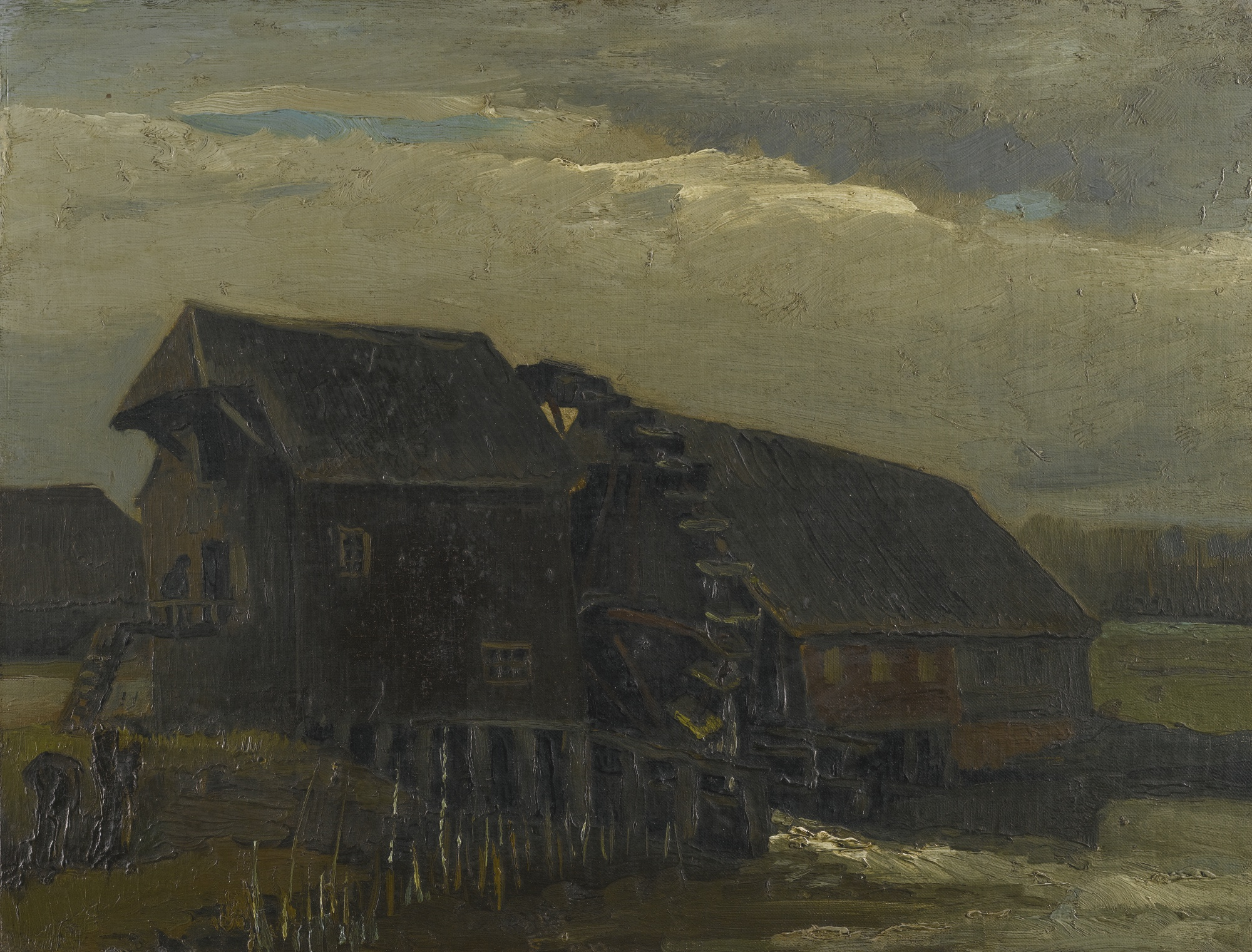
Water Mill at Opwetten, by Vincent van Gogh, 1884 (F48)

The gristmill was built in the early 11th century along the river Kleine Dommel, by monks of a Benedictine monastery in Sint-Truiden, Belgium. In the 14th century the mill was owned by the lords and ladies of the heerlijkheid Cuijk and Mierlo, and was a banmolen (nl), meaning peasants in the locality were obligated to use this mill to grind their wheat.

In 1664 the mill partially burned down. It was rebuilt and, in order to recover from the losses, the miller did not have to pay taxes for the next 15 years. In 1764 another fire destroyed the entire mill, according to an ordenance from the States General after the miller requested assistance. The mill was rebuilt with the addition of a second water wheel. The larger building was a gristmill and the smaller building an oil mill. In 1909 a sawmill was added to the larger building, and for a period the smaller building also acted as a fulling mill.

A plaque placed on the miller's house in 1973 to celebrate the 100th birthday of miller Gerardus van Hoorn commemorates both fires. Van Hoorn had known the Dutch painter Vincent van Gogh, who lived in nearby Nuenen from 1883 until 1885. Van Gogh painted several paintings around the mill, including an 1884 painting of the mill itself, Water Mill at Opwetten (F48). In a video interview in 1973, Van Hoorn said that he had seen Van Gogh paint and had supplied him with bird nests for his paintings.

The mill has had several names and during the first centuries it was known as the Saint Anthony Mill (Dutch: St. Antoniusmolen), named after a nearby chapel dedicated to saint Anthony the Great. From 1726 until it came into the possession of Gerardus van Hoorn in 1916, the mill was known as Jan's Mill (Dutch: Jansmolen).

== Description ==
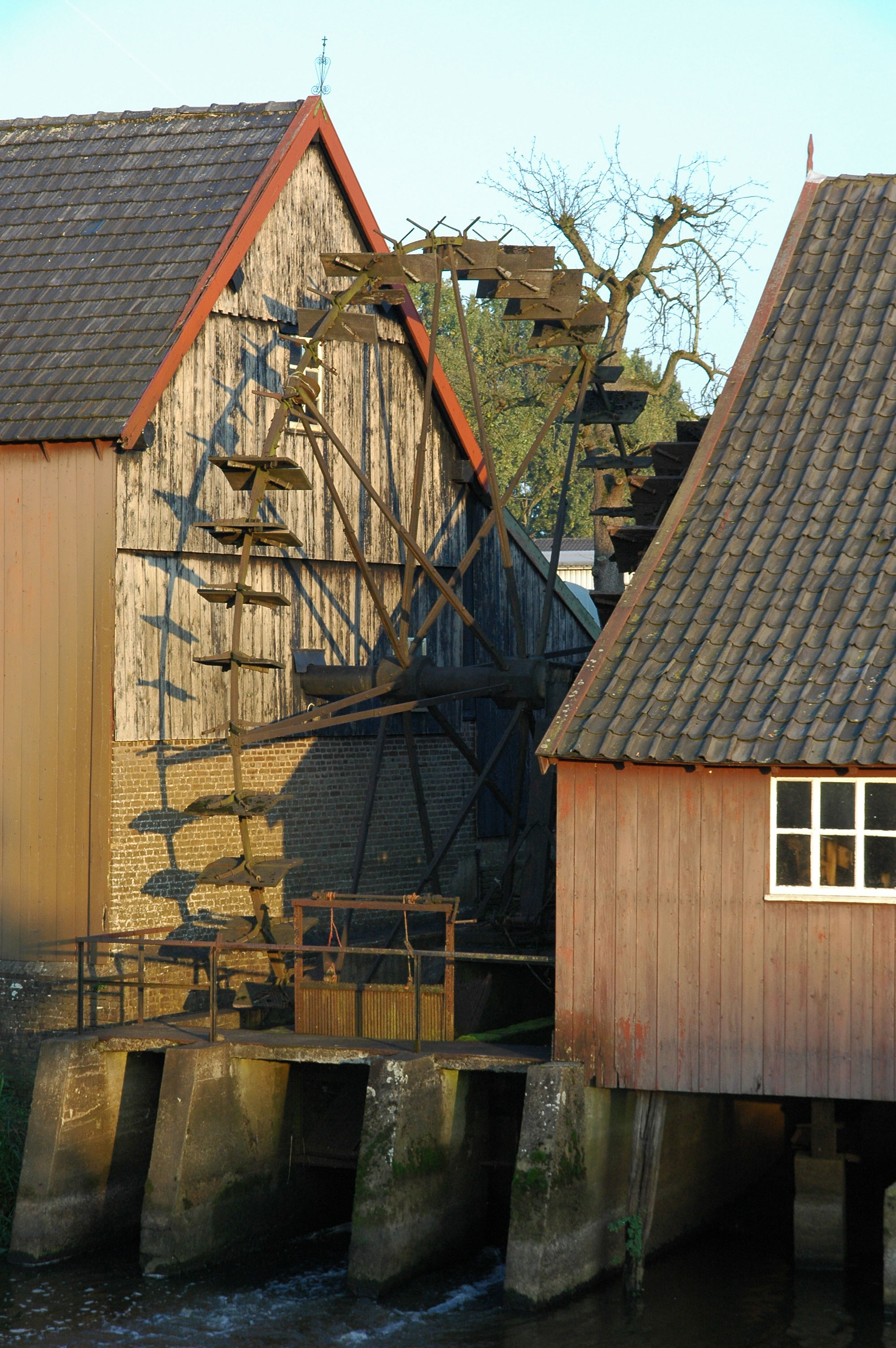
Close up of the water wheels.

The Watermill at Opwetten is situated along the river Kleine Dommel. Diverted river water flows along a channel with force to drive two wooden undershot water wheels, connected to two buildings on either side of the channel.

The buildings are made of painted wood on a brick foundation, with tiled roofs, and an extruding hatch covering the main entrance of the higher building. The gristmill, originally used to grind spelt, later ground bread wheat, and then a sawmill was added. It has a water wheel of 9.30 metres (30 ft 6 in) in diameter, consisting of 44 paddles of 80 centimetres (2 ft 7 in) width, which makes it the largest water wheel in the Netherlands. The gristmill is still in functioning order, and uses a pair of Cullen millstones from Mayen ("Cullen" for "Cologne", where such millstones were marketed from), and a pair of cast millstones, both 17 hands in diameter or 1.50 metres (4 ft 11 in). Only some remainders are left of the sawmill, including one of only two watermill circular saws in the Netherlands. Inside the larger mill is a room for the assistants of the miller, where the names of millers and their assistants have been carved in the wood.

The oil mill and fulling mill used a water wheel of 7.50 metres (24 ft 7 in) in diameter and used 30 paddles with a width of 30 centimetres (1 ft 0 in). The oil mill was used to crush and press oil-bearing seeds to extract vegetable oils, and the fullingmill kneaded wool for hours or days in order to make it thicker. Both structures are completely gone, and only two edge stones posted outside remind of its former function as oil mill. It currently houses a restaurant.

== Modern day ==
The mill was listed as a national monument (nr 30830) on 14 June 1972. The grounds are freely accessible. The gristmill is operated and open to the public on Sunday afternoon, and the restaurant is open every day of the week except on Mondays. The mill is located on the Opwettenseweg 203 in Nuenen, Gerwen en Nederwetten, in the province of North Brabant, Netherlands. The next mill upstream is the Collse Watermolen on the Kleine Dommel. The next mill downstream is the Hooidonkse Watermolen on the Dommel.

In 2011, a full-size replica of the mill was built at the Binjiang Park in Nanjing, China. (Note: The replica can be found at the following coordinates:32.020689°N 118.701833°E.) Together with replicas of three other Dutch monuments, it is part of the 'Van Gogh Friendship Park', in honour of the relationships between the sister cities of Eindhoven and Nanjing, and the sister provinces of North Brabant and Jiangsu. The mayor of Nanjing, Ji Jianye, visited the Watermill at Opwetten in 2012, during his visit to Eindhoven.

== See also ==
Other mills in North Brabant:

- Aalstermolen, in Aalst, Waalre
- Molen van Aerden, in Nispen, Roosendaal
