= Poncelet wheel =

The Poncelet wheel is a type of waterwheel invented by Jean-Victor Poncelet while working at the École d'Application in Metz. It roughly doubled the efficiency of existing undershot waterwheels through a series of detail improvements. The first Poncelet wheel was constructed in 1838, and the design quickly became common in France. Although the design was a great improvement on existing designs, further improvements in turbine design rendered the Poncelet wheel obsolete by the mid-century.

== Design ==
Traditional undershot waterwheels consisted of a series of flat blades fixed to the rim of a wheel. The blades were typically radial, i.e. mounted so that they pointed straight out along the radius of the wheel. When water from the headrace flowed past the wheel, it hit the blades, and some of its kinetic energy was converted into work by the wheel. However, much of the water was reflected off the blade and in the resulting turbulence a lot of the energy was converted to heat. This process was not efficient; much of the original velocity in the water remained in it, meaning that kinetic energy was not being captured. Typical efficiency of water wheels exploiting only the kinetic energy was around 30%. These wheels are called stream water wheels, or kinetic water wheels. Instead, undershot water wheels are used in low head sites, like less than 1.5 m, and they also exploit the potential energy of the flow, with efficiencies of up to 84%. Typical examples are Sagebien and Zuppinger undershot water wheels.

Jean Charles de Borda was the first to directly characterize the efficiency of waterwheels by comparing the velocities of water before and after meeting the wheel. Poncelet was familiar with this work and started looking for ways to improve the design. He stated that "After having reflected on this, it seemed to me that we could fulfil this double condition by replacing the straight blades on ordinary wheels with curved or cylindrical blades, presenting their concavity to the current."

His design used curved blades positioned so the water met the blade flat to its edge instead of the side. This eliminated the "bounce" that robbed power from the typical design. The water rose up into the channel between the blades for about 15 degrees of rotation, and then drained back out after another 15 degrees, where it dropped out of the channel, over the curve of the blade, imparting further impulse. By the time it left, the water had almost no velocity left. He estimated that practical wheels would reach as high as 80% for low velocity streams, and 70% for high velocity ones that fill the buckets too quickly.

Poncelet developed the design in 1823 and built a small model in 1824 that demonstrated 72% efficiency. Several commercial models followed, including a large installation in Metz that delivered 33% more power than the traditional wheel it replaced, in spite of implementing only some of the design . He published a longer paper on the design in 1826, and a much more detailed version in 1827. The design won a Prix de Mecanique from the French Academy of Sciences, who were funding development of the waterwheel and also awarded several other designs similar awards.

Poncelet wheels became common in France and Germany, where undershot designs were common. However, the large-scale installation of steam engines and water turbines led to the Poncelet wheel falling from use.

== See also ==
- Water wheel
- Sagebien wheel, a similar concept from the same era
