= Eindhovensch Kanaal =

Canal in North Brabant, Netherlands

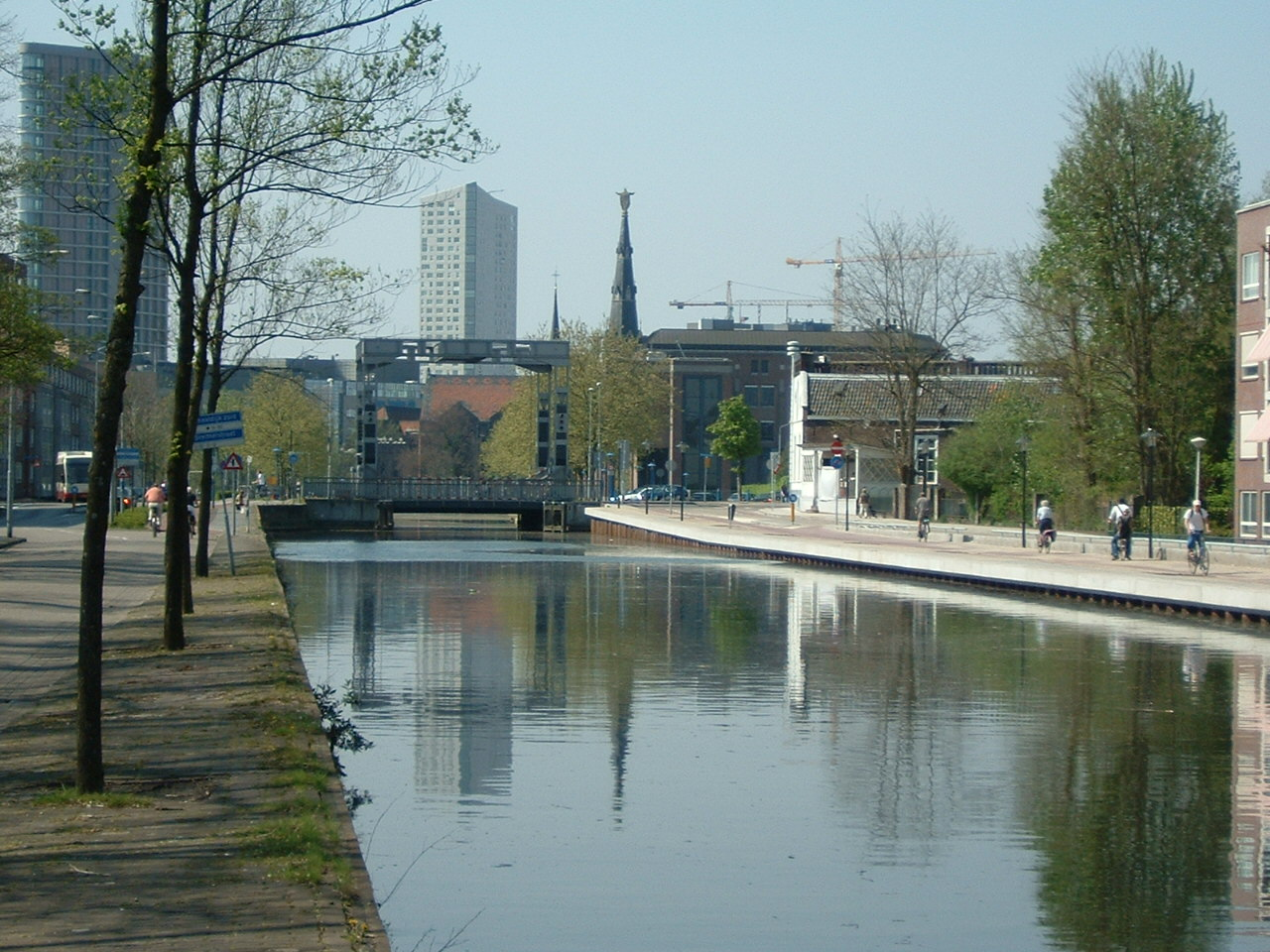
- Eindhoven Canal in Eindhoven
- Interactive map of Eindhovensch Kanaal
- Country: Netherlands, Belgium

Specifications
- Length: 13.9 km (8.6 miles)
- Status: Open for recreational use

History
- Date completed: 1846

Geography
- Start point: City center, Eindhoven
- End point: Zuid-Willemsvaart, near Helmond
- Beginning coordinates: 51.437466°N 5.486970°E
- Ending coordinates: 51.457989°N 5.671919°E

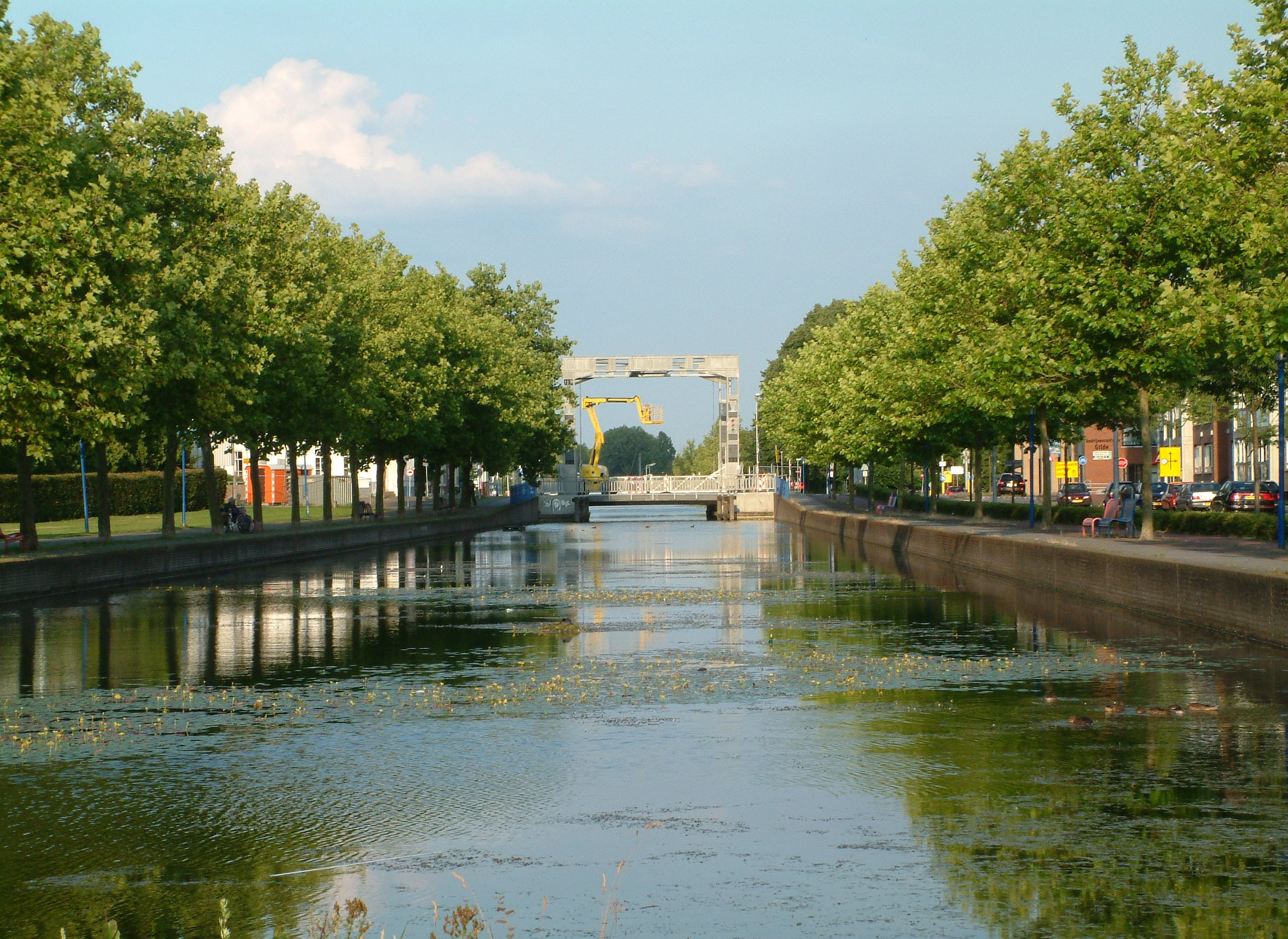
Eindhoven Canal with the lift bridge, facing east

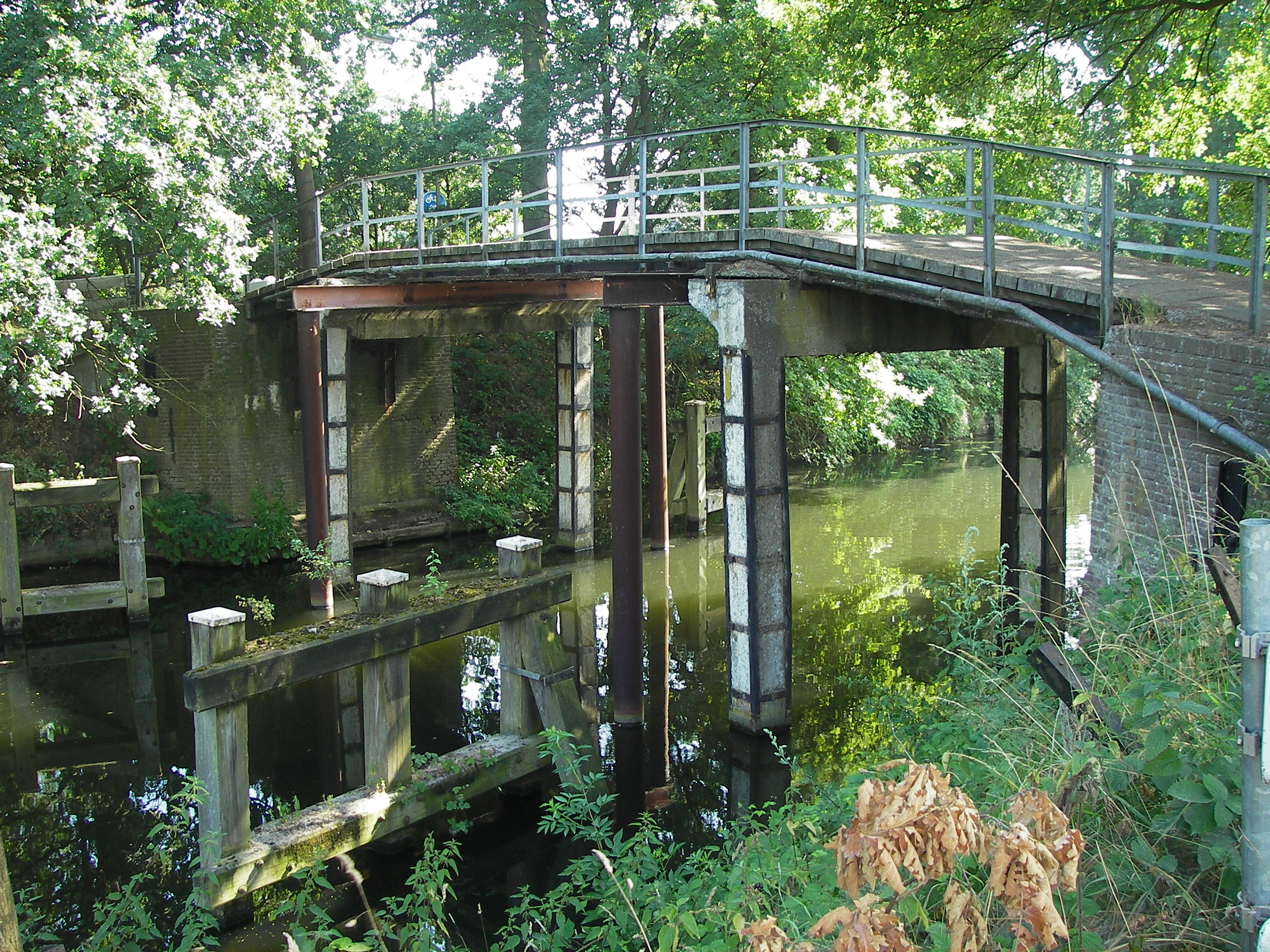
The old bridge over the Eindhoven Canal near Brandevoort

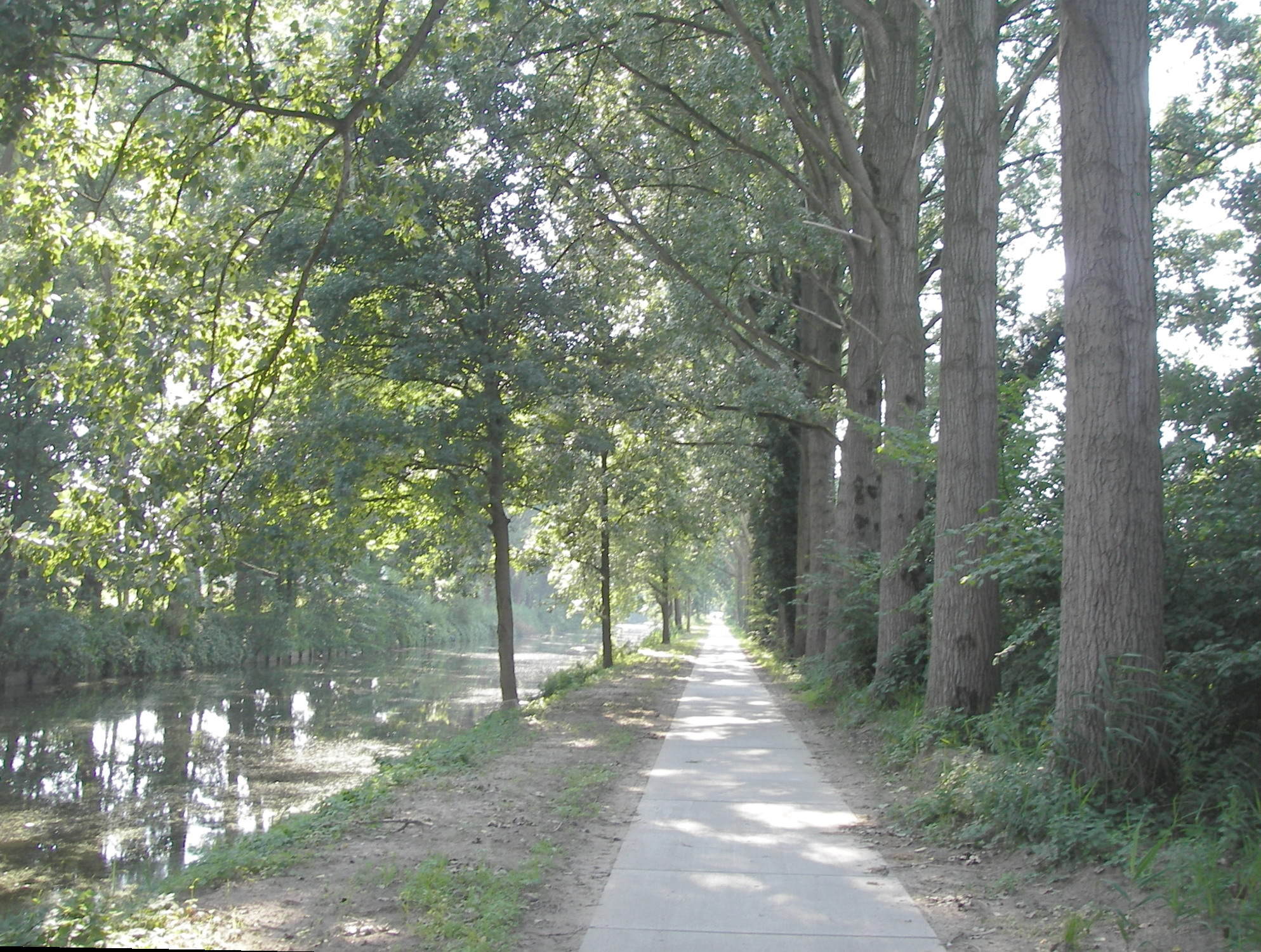
Eindhoven Canal near Mierlo

The Eindhovensch Kanaal (or Eindhovens Kanaal; Engl: Eindhoven Canal) is a canal in the Dutch province of North Brabant. It connects the center of Eindhoven with the Zuid-Willemsvaart. It was dug in the period 1843-1846, commissioned by the town of Eindhoven. The canal is 13.9 kilometers long and runs by a number of Eindhoven industrial areas and the towns of Geldrop, Mierlo and Helmond. The canal runs over the Kleine Dommel and the Goorloop, which are led under the canal by ducts.

The canal has not been in use for commercial shipping since 1971. However, the canal sees much recreational use; it is used for sport fishing, there is a bicycle path and a number of local rowing associations use it for practice.

The spelling Eindhovensch Kanaal is old-fashioned and the common spelling in Dutch is Eindhovens Kanaal nowadays. However, Eindhovensch Kanaal is still the official spelling.

== History ==
After the resurrection of The Netherlands in 1813 and during the start of the Industrial Revolution, the city fathers of Eindhoven felt a need to connect the city to the existing waterways. This implied the need for a new canal, due to the distance to the Zuid-Willemsvaart. The Belgian Revolution delayed the construction of this canal, but a permit for a canal was issued in 1843. The permit was for a canal that crossed the Kleine Dommel and the Goorloop, which necessitated the construction of ducts for those streams. In addition to those ducts ten wooden bridges were constructed, high enough to let boats pass underneath. Finally, a winding hole was laid in Tongelre and a sluice was installed at the canal mouth in the Zuid-Willemsvaart. The completed canal was opened for use in 1846.

The main use of the canal was in the transport of heavy goods: machinery for the industry as well as bulk cargoes of charcoal and rough wool, plus wood for the matchmaking and cigarbox factories. Later on a steam connection to Rotterdam was added, with the first steam boat traversing the canal in 1862. This brought new industry to Eindhoven around the harbor, such as the old Eindhoven gas works. This in turn inspired more infrastructure, including a tram bridge near Mierlo (the foundations of which are still visible).

The Eindhoven Canal was widened and modernized between 1929 and 1934. After World War II the internal shipping of the country (including to Eindhoven) temporarily rebounded. But the rise of motorized road transport soon and permanently killed it off again and the canal was closed to commercial shipping in 1974. There were plans for a while to drain the canal and lay a motorway on its bed, but those plans were canceled in the failing economy of the times. The canal is currently a quiet nature area for recreational use and is part of the Ecological Mainline.

== Nature and landscape ==
The canal landscape is very interesting from an ecological point of view. The banks are lined with reeds and carices, the paths with wild flowers such as Solomon's Seal. The water hosts several remarkable water plants such as potamogetons, water soldier and the rare brittle waternymph (which spread into the canal in 1992). The old harbor area is also a nature area now, featuring several introduced species of plants; very notable among these is the Forez striped fern, which was discovered in the harbor in 1988.

The Eindhoven Canal crossed the drainage areas of the Kleine Dommel and the Goorloop. This means that the bicycle patch along the canal is also a natural access path to the Hulsterbroek, Urkhovense Zeggen and Groot Goor nature preserves.

== Monuments ==
The lift bridge over the canal in Eindhoven is an industrial monument (together with a number of nearby buildings, one of which – the former ice cream factory of Tongelre – houses the DAF museum). Some of the original street paving with the original cobblestones has been preserved here as well.
