= Strabrechtse Heide =

Coordinates: 51°24′0″N 5°37′3″E

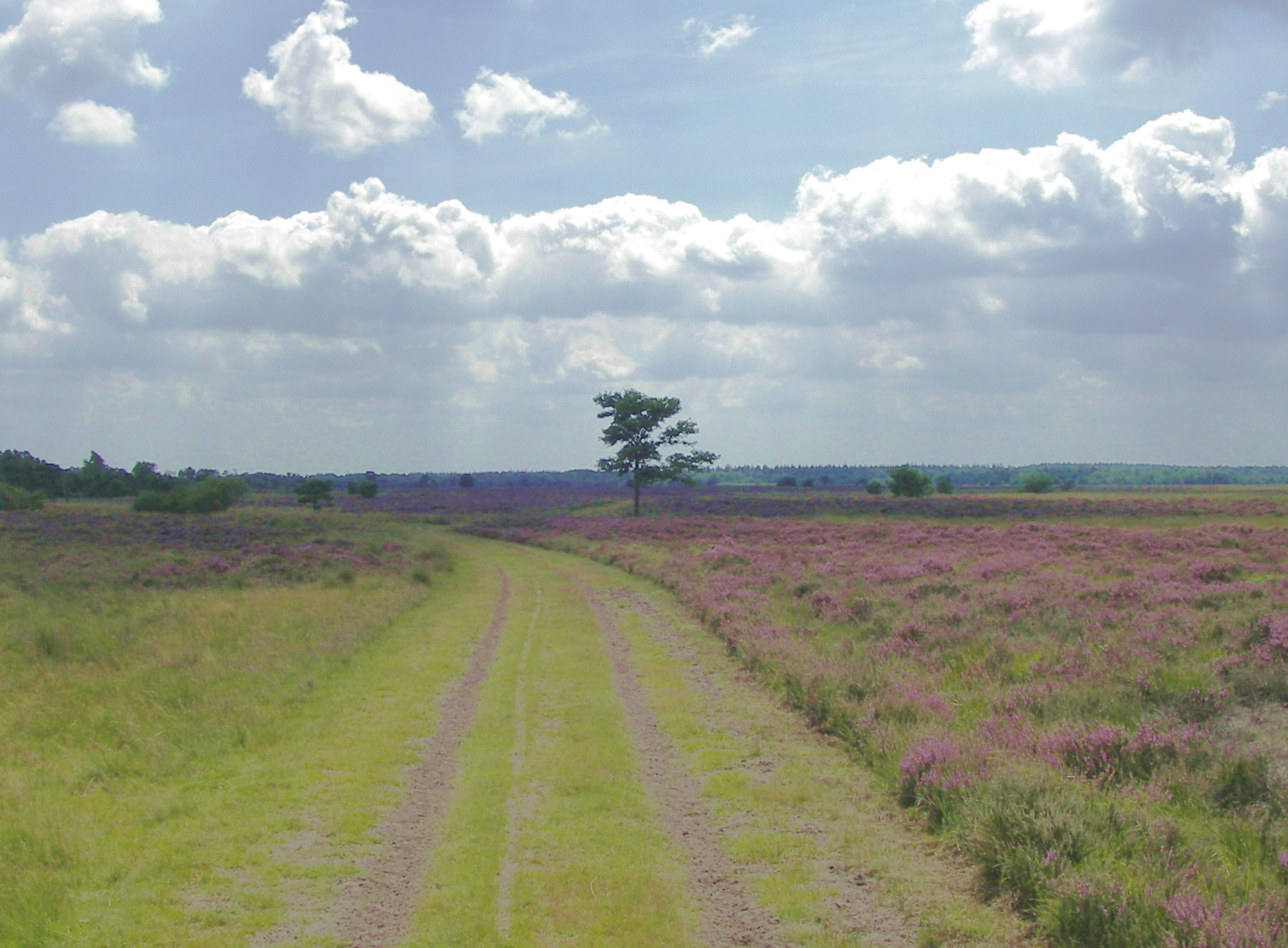
The Strabrechtse Heide

The Strabrechtse Heide is a natural heathland area about 1500 ha in size, located in the municipalities of Heeze-Leende, Someren and Geldrop-Mierlo, in North Brabant, the Netherlands. It is largely under the care of Staatsbosbeheer. In July 2010, around 200 hectares of the area were damaged or destroyed in a wildfire that took over a week to put out.

== Location and surroundings ==
In the northwest, the Strabrechtse Heide passes into the Braakhuizense Heide, which is owned by the foundation Brabants Landschap. Near Heeze, the healthlands and fields pass into the Herbertusbossen (also owned by Brabants Landschap) and the grounds of Heeze Castle. The area partially falls under the Habitats Directive and the Birds Directive of the European Union. In 2006, the Strabrechtse Heide, along with a part of the valley of the Kleine Dommel stream, was assigned as Natura 2000 area under the Natura 2000 area name "Strabrechtse Heide & Beuven".

The eastern part of the area that lies in the municipality of Someren was originally called Lieropsche Heide, after the village of Lierop. In the nineteenth century, both it and the Strabrechtse Heide proper were part of a larger heathland area between the valleys of the Kleine Dommel and the Aa rivers. Towards the north, the heath extended to Nuenen (there called Molenheide, Collsche Heide and Refelingse Heide). To the south of the road between Heeze and Someren, the Somerensche Heide extended to the Weerterbosch and Groote Peel areas. Around the beginning of the twentieth century, most of the heaths to the north of the Strabrechtse Heide were converted into forest or agricultural land. The construction of the A67 motorway separated the Strabrechtse Heide from the forest area between Geldrop and Mierlo. Plans to construct the A2 motorway to the east of Eindhoven, which would separate the heath from the valley of the Kleine Dommel, were not carried out.

Common Heather and Common Juniper are found in the dry areas, and the more marshy wetlands are home to Erica, Purple Moor Grass, Bog Myrtle and Marsh Gentian. The spread of grass across the area is countered by allowing a flock of sheep to graze, by mowing and sod cutting. The heath area is surrounded by forests. The transition area towards the valley of the Kleine Dommel has several unusual forms of plant life and is also important for many animal species.

== Fire ==
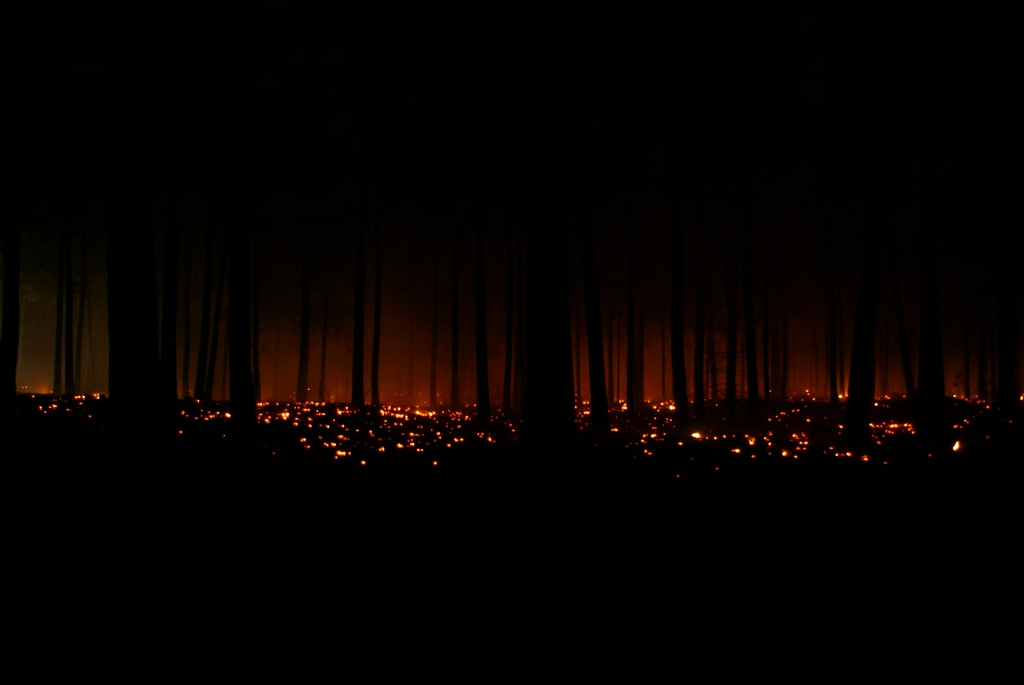
The July 2010 fire

On 2 July 2010, a wildfire started in the northern part of the Strabrechtse Heide, after several weeks of hot and dry summer weather. The fire was initially fought by hundreds of firefighters, assisted by 100 more from the Dutch Military. Because of the fire, the A67 motorway had to be closed off for a short period. The roadway was at one point completely covered in smoke and the flames were even able to reach across to the median and then to other side of the road, igniting the dry grass there too in a few places. The fire took several days to master, and over a week to put out completely, and destroyed about 200 hectares of forest and heathland, over ten percent of the total area.

== Insect reserve ==
Since April 2012, the Stabrechtse heide has been made a nature reserve specifically for insects.
