= Alphonse Sagebien =

French hydrological engineer

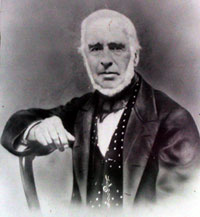
Alphonse Sagebien.

Alphonse Eléonor Sagebien (1807–1892) was a French hydrological engineer born in Amiens and the inventor of the Sagebien wheel - a device that made hydraulically powered systems much more efficient in extracting energy from moving water.

Sagebien graduated in 1833 with a degree in engineering from the prestigious École Centrale des Arts et Manufactures and worked primarily in metallurgy. He discovered many of the mineral seams still worked today in the French department of Pas-de-Calais. After 1848, he shifted to hydrological engineering, designing and patenting the wheel that bears his name. This invention was able to extract 50% more energy from flowing water than previous paddle-based systems and is still used today. His invention received a number of awards both in France and abroad, include the gold medal at the 1878 Exhibitiion.

Sagebien was also a municipal counsellor for Amiens from 1878 to 1888.
