= Watermill at Kollen =

Watermill in Eindhoven, Netherlands

- Collse Watermolen
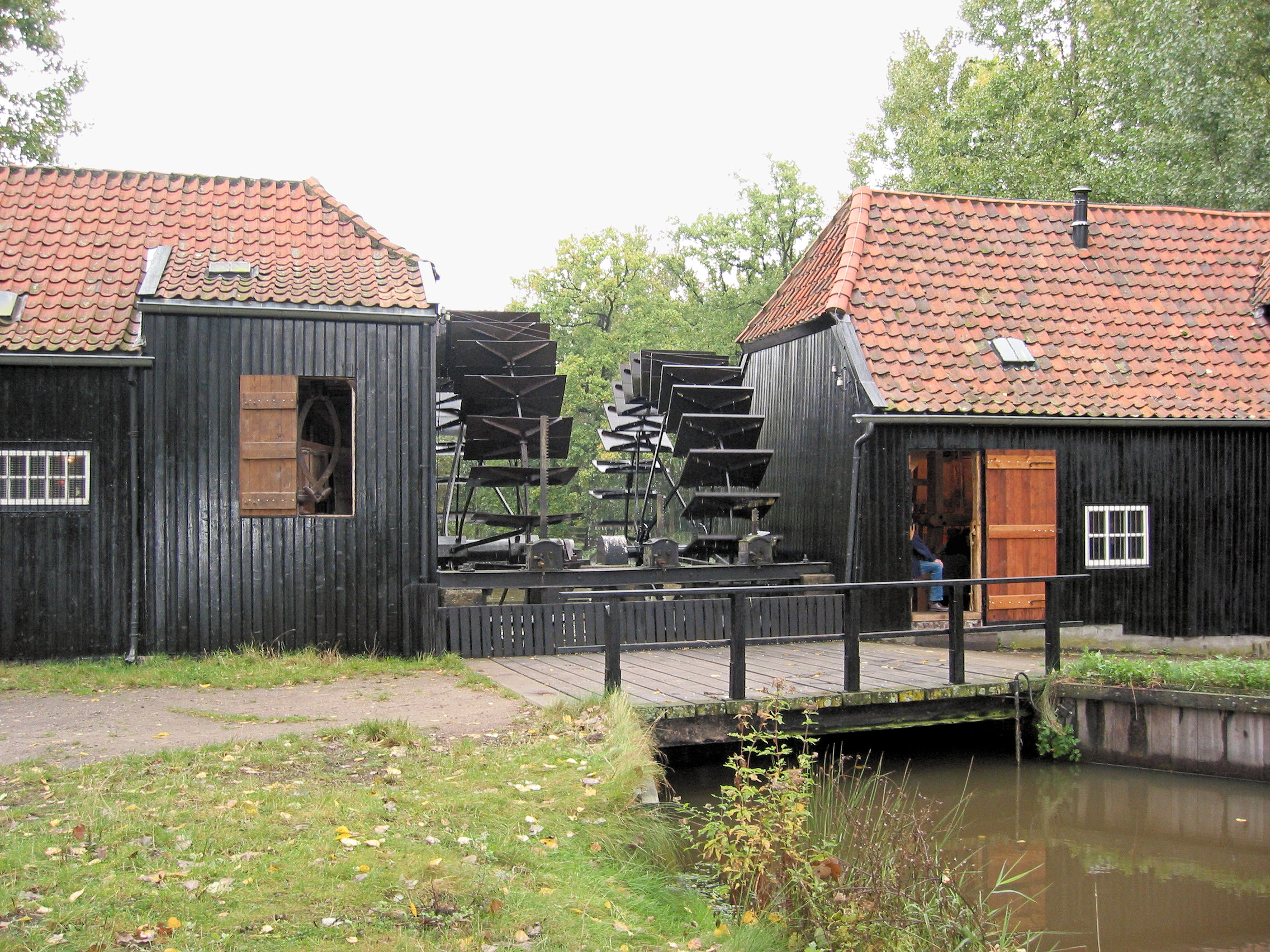
- Watermill at Kollen in 2007

General information
- Status: Rijksmonument (14648)
- Type: Watermill
- Address: Collseweg 1; 5641 JN, 't Coll
- Town or city: Eindhoven
- Country: Netherlands
- Coordinates: 51.445278°N 5.537778°E
- Completed: 1681
- Designations: Gristmill, oil mill

References
- Database of Mills; De Hollandsche Molen

The Watermill at Kollen (Dutch: Collse Watermolen) is a watermill along the river Kleine Dommel, located on the Collseweg 1 in 't Coll, Eindhoven, in the province of North Brabant, Netherlands. First mentioned in the 14th century, the watermill burned down and was rebuilt in 1681.

The watermill complex was made up out of two buildings, operating two undershot water wheels. One building was a gristmill, while another functioned as oil mill. The gristmill and oil mill are both still in functioning order and are used on a small scale. Vincent van Gogh lived nearby and made several paintings while in the area, including a painting of the mill in 1884. The watermill was listed as a national monument in 1972.

== History ==
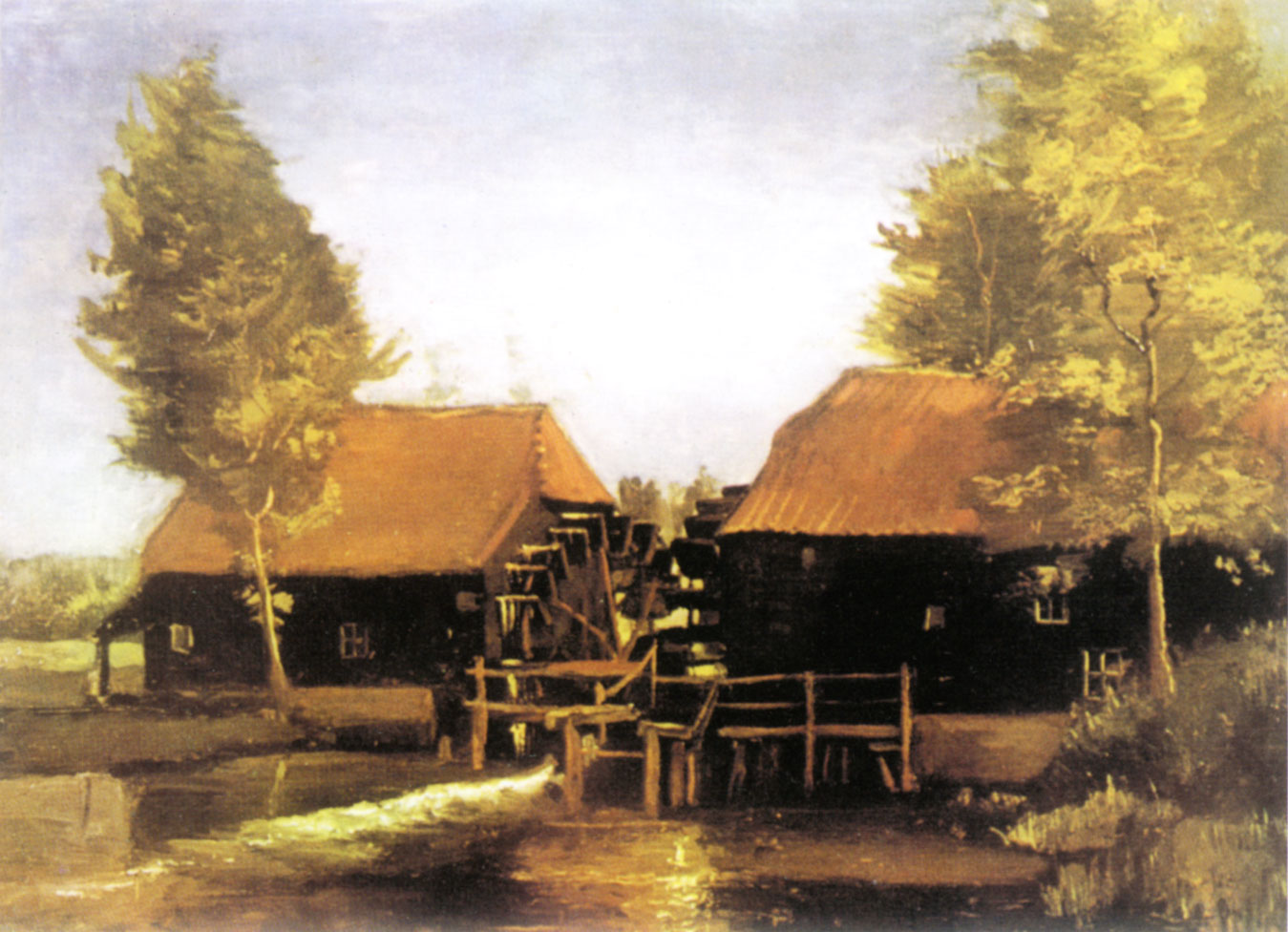
Water Mill at Kollen Near Nuenen, by Vincent van Gogh, 1884 (F48a)

In 1681 the mill completely burned down.

The Dutch painter Vincent van Gogh lived in nearby Nuenen from 1883 until 1885. Van Gogh painted several paintings around the mill, including an 1884 painting of the mill itself, Water Mill at Kollen Near Nuenen (F48a).

== Modern day ==
The mill was listed as a national monument (nr 14648) on 14 August 1972. The grounds are freely accessible. The gristmill is operated and open to the public on Saturdays, and the oil mill is operated twice a month. The mill is located on the Collseweg 1 in Eindhoven, in the province of North Brabant, Netherlands The next mill upstream is the Watermill at Geldrop, the next mill downstream is the Watermill at Opwetten.

== See also ==
Other mills in North Brabant:

- Watermill at Opwetten, in Opwetten, Nuenen, Gerwen en Nederwetten
- Molen van Aerden, in Nispen, Roosendaal
