= Water Mill at Opwetten =

Painting by Vincent van Gogh

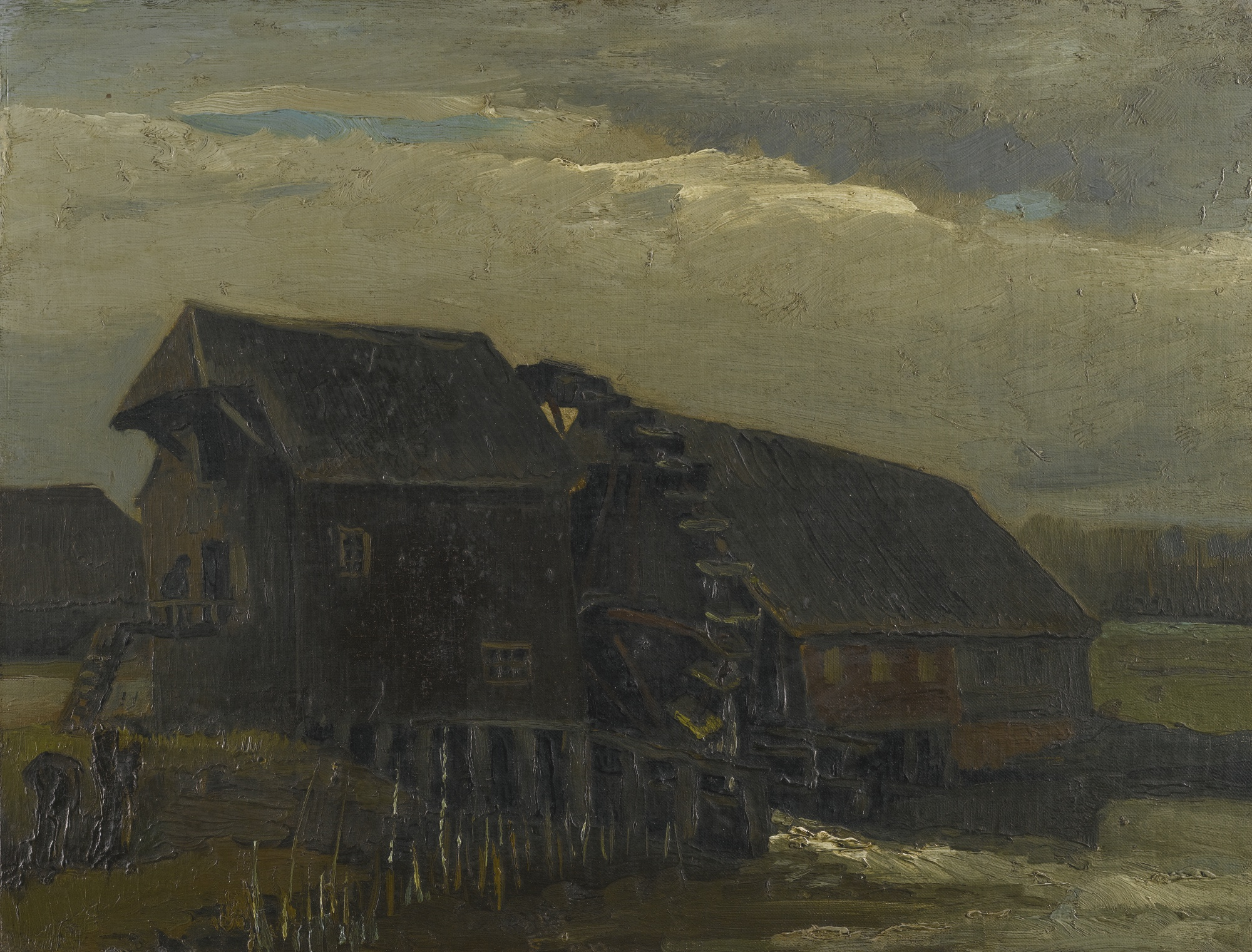
- Artist: Vincent van Gogh
- Year: 1884
- Catalogue: F48; JH527
- Medium: Oil on canvas on panel
- Dimensions: 45.0 cm × 58.0 cm (17.7 in × 22.8 in)
- Location: Private collection

Water Mill at Opwetten (F48) is an oil painting of the Watermill at Opwetten, created in 1884 by Vincent van Gogh. It is considered one of his first works using oil paint as a medium and anticipates Van Gogh's early realist masterpiece, The Potato Eaters.

Van Gogh described the process of painting this piece to his friend painter Anthon van Rappard in May 1884, writing

"Since you left I’ve been working on a Water mill — the one I asked about in that little inn at the station, where we sat talking with that man whom I told you seemed to suffer from a chronic shortage of small change in his pocket. It’s the same sort of thing as the two other water mills that we visited together, but with two red roofs, and which one views square on from the front — with poplars around it. Will be magnificent in the autumn."

— Letter 448

== See also ==
- List of works by Vincent van Gogh
