= Water Mill at Kollen Near Nuenen =

Painting by Vincent van Gogh

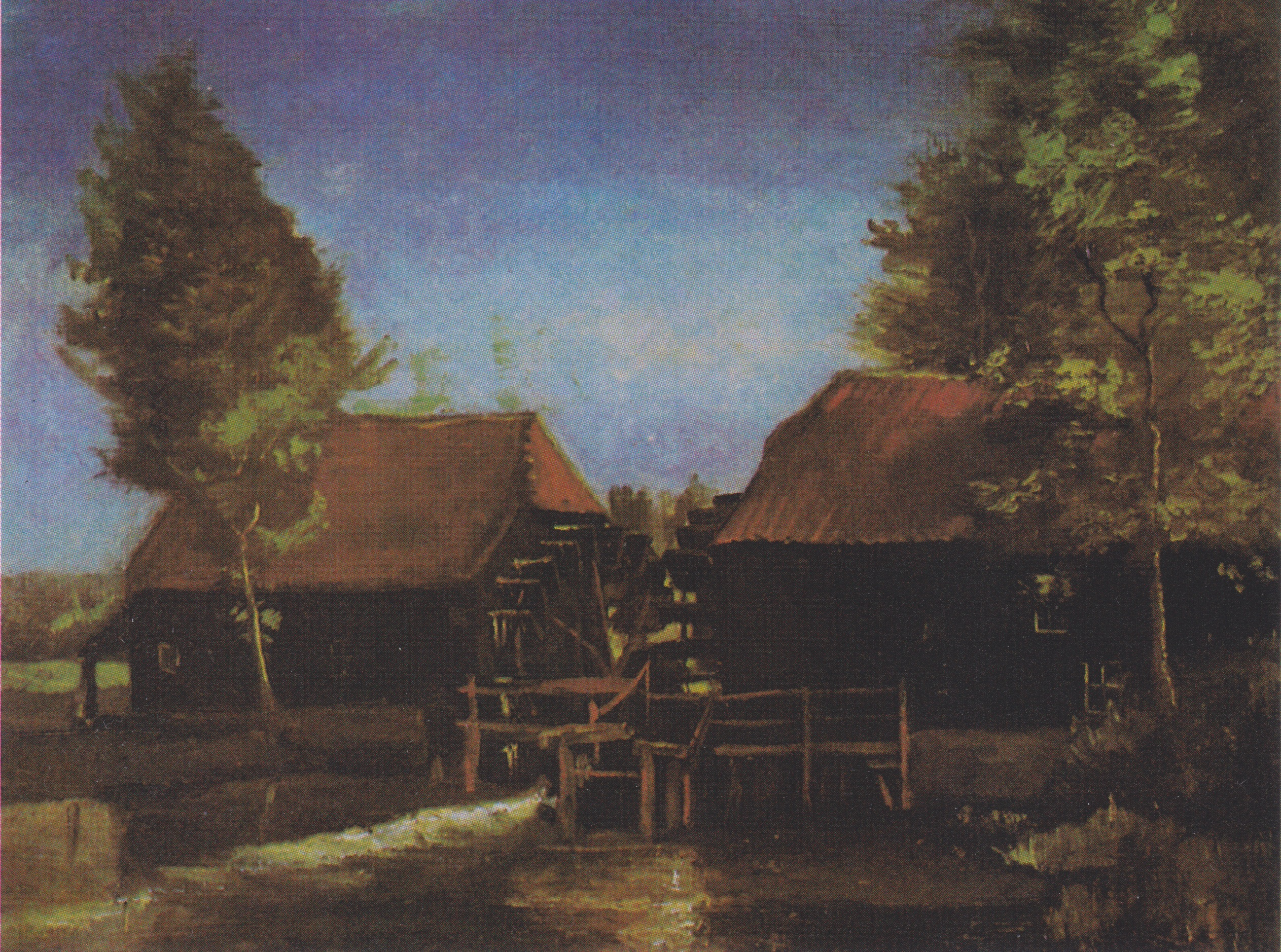
- Artist: Vincent van Gogh
- Year: 1884
- Catalogue: F48a; JH488
- Medium: Oil on canvas on cardboard
- Dimensions: 57.5 cm × 78.0 cm (22.6 in × 30.7 in)
- Location: Noordbrabants Museum; 's-Hertogenbosch

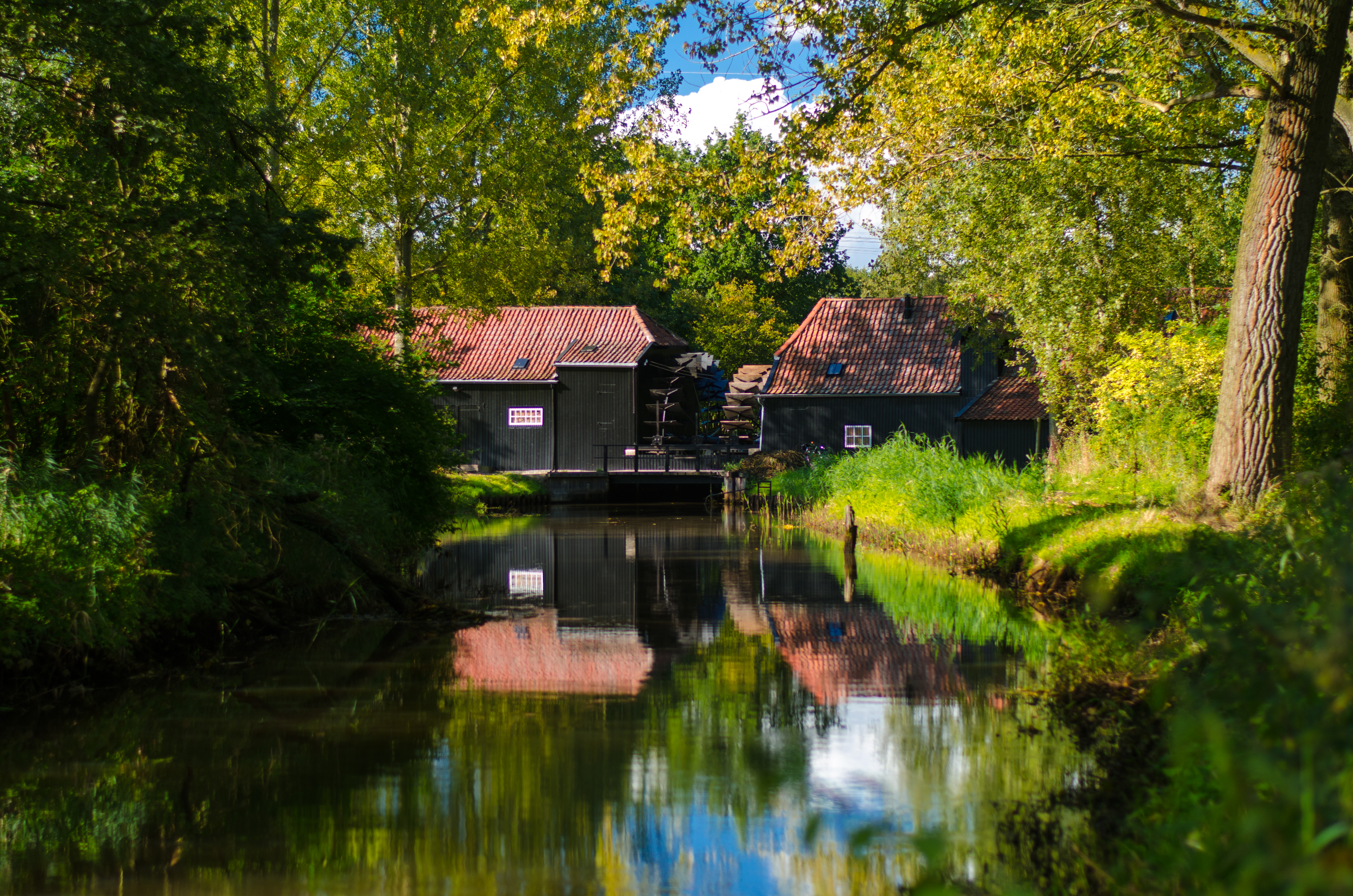
Watermill at Kollen today

Water Mill at Kollen Near Nuenen (Dutch: Collse watermolen, F48a, JH488) is an oil painting of the Watermill at Kollen, created on 28–29 May 1884 by Vincent van Gogh during the period when he was living at Nuenen nearby. It measures 60.5 by 80 centimetres (23.8 in × 31.5 in).

Van Gogh mentioned the work in a letter to Anthon van Rappard dated 29 May 1884 (letter 448) in which he wrote "Since you left I've been working on a Water mill - the one I asked about in that little inn at the station ... with two red roofs, and which one views square on from the front - with poplars around it."

After passing through the hands of dealers and collectors in the Netherlands and then the US, it was sold in November 2017 by Sotheby's in New York for US$3.1 million, catalogued under the title Le Moulin à l'eau. It was acquired by the Noordbrabants Museum, in 's-Hertogenbosch, in the south of The Netherlands. The museum about 40 kilometres (25 mi) north of the watermill, which became a Dutch national monument in 1972.

== See also ==
- List of works by Vincent van Gogh
