= Sagebien wheel =

The Sagebien wheel is a type of water wheel invented by Alphonse Sagebien of France, a hydrological engineer and a graduate of the École Centrale des Arts et Manufactures. It was one of the most efficient breastshot water wheel designs of its era; when working on a low head of water, the Sagebien wheel could reach efficiencies of up to 90% in real-world examples.

== Design ==
Traditional breastshot waterwheels consist of a series of flat blades fixed to the rim of a wheel. The blades were typically mounted so they faced straight out along the radius of the wheel. Water from the millstock flowed into the wheel at a point on the side of rotation, hitting the blades and imparting momentum on them. The weight of the water then pulls the wheel downward through gravity. The breastshot wheel thus extracts power from both the weight and momentum of the water. Breastshot wheels reached efficiencies of up to 50%, compared to typical undershot wheels, which achieved around 30%.

During a widespread French effort to improve water wheel designs, Jean Charles de Borda discovered that efficiency was a function of the relative speed of the water entering and exiting the wheel. As the incoming speed is a function of the water source, the key to extracting more power from a water wheel is reducing the velocity of the exhaust water as much as possible. He also noticed that water entering the system was often slowed before it reached the wheel through various mechanisms. He suggested that great improvements could be made by improving these aspects of wheel design.

In a conventional breastshot design, the water would flow off the edge of the headrace and fall onto the blades of the wheel. In comparison, the Sagebien wheel had the water enter through a channel, flowing horizontally. The blades of the wheel were angled so they entered the flowing water vertically. The inside of the wheel was open, allowing the water to flow up into the channel without the air pressure building up and impeding the flow. The water flowed back out again after a short time, as the wheel turned, perhaps 30 to 45 degrees, into the lower-altitude tailrace.

Sagebien built his first wheel around 1850 and made the first full-sized version, at 6 to 7 horsepower, at a flour mill in Ronquerolles in 1851. Testing demonstrated this wheel operated at about 85% efficiency, well in advance of any design of the era. This attracted little notice at the time, in the era of the steam engine, but by 1857, he had 17 in operation, and people started to take note. One test in December 1861 suggested an efficiency of one model of 103%, until a new gauge reduced this to a still-excellent 93%. By 1868, more than 60 Sagebien wheels were in use in northern France, and the French Academy of Sciences awarded him the Fourneyron Prix in 1875. Modern tests conducted by Quaranta and Muller (2017) showed efficiencies of up to 84% (https://www.youtube.com/watch?v=f-AfK2Bl4NY).

== See also ==
- Poncelet wheel, a similar concept that improved the undershot design
