= Ukrainian refugee crisis =

Ongoing refugee crisis in Europe

- Part of the humanitarian impact of the Russo-Ukrainian war
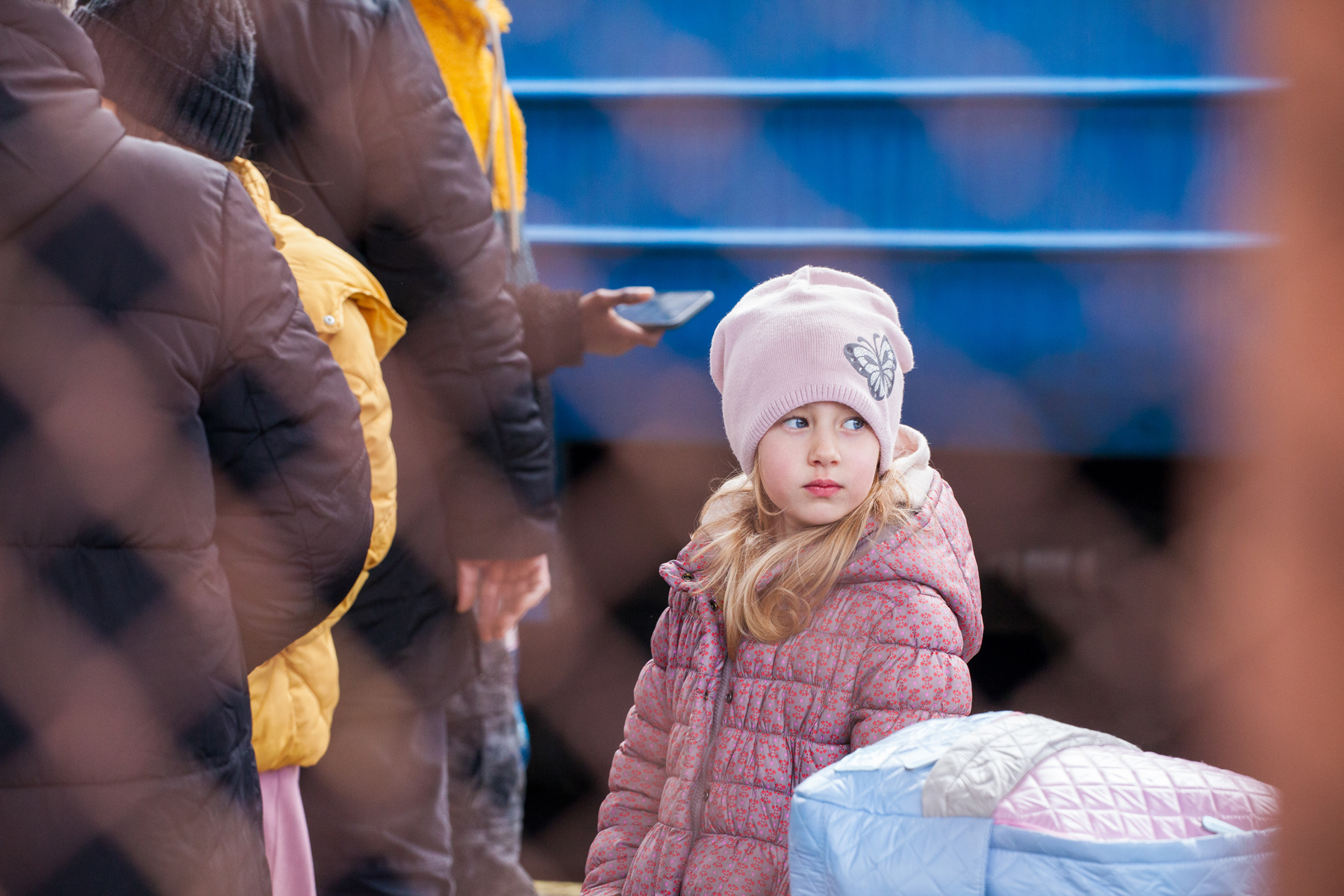
- A Ukrainian child refugee at a train station in Przemyśl, Poland (27 February 2022)
- Duration: 24 February 2022 – present (4 years, 8 months, 1 week and 5 days)
- Location: Worldwide, but especially the European Union
- Total affected: 11+ million; 5.7 million refugees outside Ukraine and 5.3 million displaced internally (per UNHCR and IOM, 2024); 35,000+ Ukrainian children abducted by Russia (per Yale Humanitarian Research Lab, 2025)

The Ukrainian refugee crisis began with the Russian invasion of Ukraine in February 2022. As of September 2025, the UNHCR has recorded 5.7 million Ukrainian refugees around the world, with 90% of this figure residing in various European countries outside of Ukraine. Older reports by the International Organization for Migration in May 2022 show approximately eight million Ukrainians as internally displaced persons. By 20 March 2022, nearly one-quarter of Ukraine's total population had been displaced due to active military hostilities with Russia. About 90% of all Ukrainian refugees are women and children; by 24 March, more than half of all children in Ukraine had left their homes, of whom a quarter had left the country as well. Men between the ages of 18 and 60 have been banned from leaving the country under Ukrainian martial law, which came into force a few hours into Russia's first military offensive into Ukraine. This ongoing escalation of the Russo-Ukrainian War has caused the largest refugee crisis in the 21st century and the fourth-largest refugee crisis in modern history as a whole, with the highest refugee flight rate globally. It is also the first European refugee crisis since the Yugoslav Wars in the 1990s and the largest one to have occurred in Europe since World War II.

The vast majority of Ukrainian refugees initially entered neighbouring countries to the west of Ukraine (Poland, Slovakia, Hungary, Romania, and Moldova). Around three million of these people then moved further west to other European countries. As of May 2025, the UNHCR reports that the countries in which the largest numbers of Ukrainians had applied for asylum, or other temporary protection, are Germany (1.2 million), Poland (1 million), and the Czech Republic (0.4 million). As of September 2022, Human Rights Watch has documented that Ukrainian civilians, particularly children, have been forcibly transferred to Russia. The OHCHR has corroborated this claim, stating that "There have been credible allegations of forced transfers of unaccompanied children to Russian-occupied territory, or to the Russian Federation itself." The United States Department of State estimated that at least 900,000 Ukrainian citizens (including children) were forcibly transferred to Russia in the first six months after the invasion. Around the same time in late 2022, more than 4.5 million Ukrainians had returned to Ukraine, owing to the withdrawal of Russian troops from all fronts but the Donbas and parts of southern Ukraine.

The European Union (EU) has allowed entry to all Ukrainian refugees, and it has also invoked the Temporary Protection Directive to grant displaced Ukrainians the right to stay, work, and study in any EU member state for an initial period of one year. In August 2026, the EU introduced a requirement for newly granted temporary protection to Ukrainian applicants to comply with their military obligations in Ukraine.

== Refugees before the 2022 invasion ==
Before the invasion, the annexation of Crimea by the Russian Federation and the war in the Donbas, both of which are aspects of the Russo-Ukrainian War, had already resulted in over two million refugees and internally displaced persons since 2014. They have been referred to as Europe's forgotten refugees by some media, due to their cool reception in the European Union, comparatively low asylum claim success rate, and media neglect.

More than a million of the pre-2022 refugees, mainly from Donbas, had gone to Russia between 2014 and 2016, while the number of people displaced within Ukraine had grown to 1.6 million people by early March 2016.

== Journey ==
=== Transportation ===
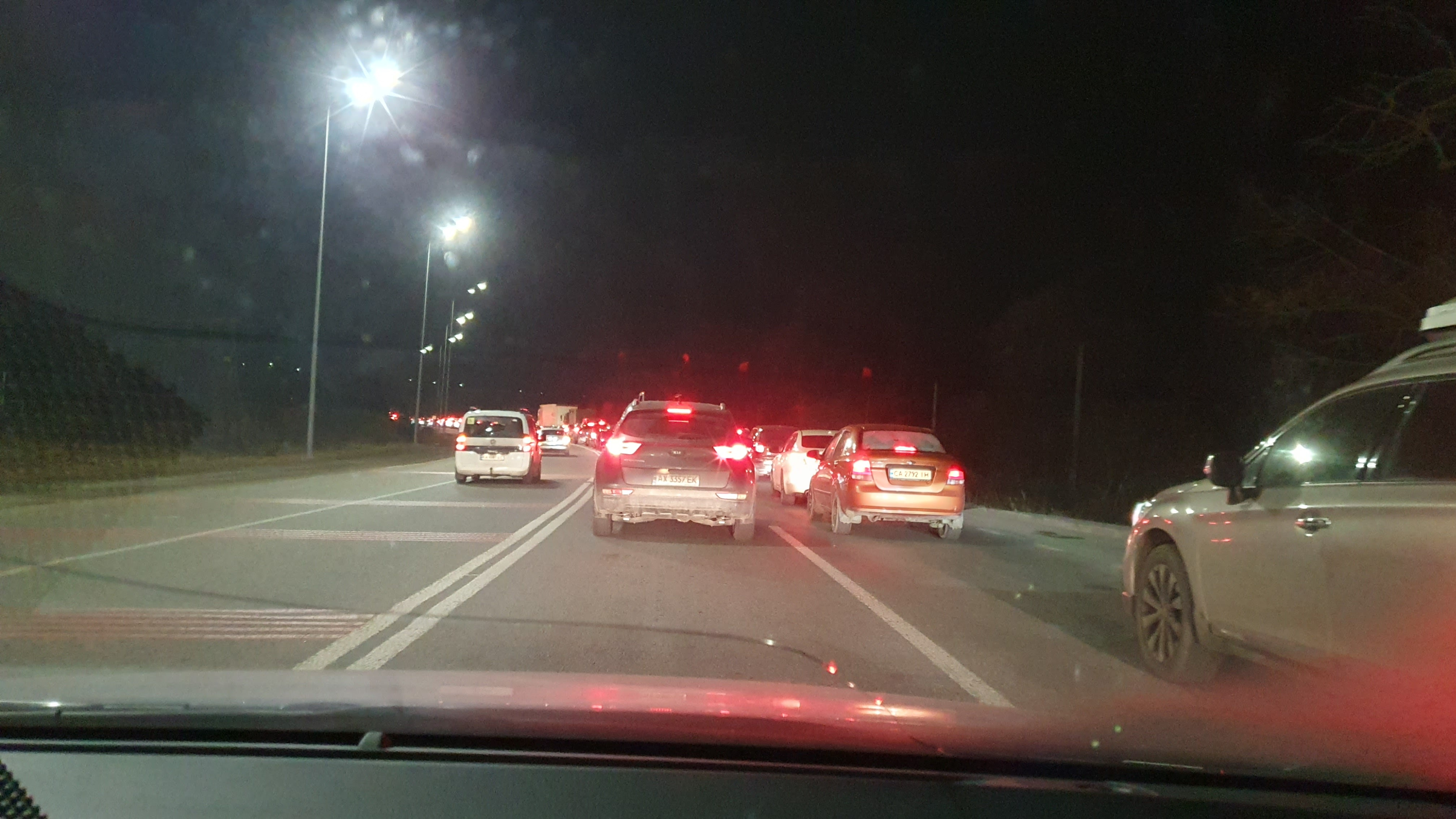
Cars heading westward on 25 February 2022

For many refugees heading westward, trains played a vital role in the journey within Ukraine and into neighboring countries. Oleksandr Kamyshin, the CEO of Ukrainian Railways, which operates the majority of train services in Ukraine, estimated that within three weeks of the start of the invasion, the network had transported 2.5 million passengers. He also said at its peak, the network transported 190,000 people a day.

To ensure trains can travel as safely as possible, the network had to constantly adapt to situations on the ground, such as if tracks are damaged by bombs or if they are no longer under Ukrainian control. Trains have to move slower because they are often overloaded to fit as many people as possible, as well as minimising the risk of hitting damaged tracks. At night, trains also turn off their lights to reduce the chance of being targeted.

Railway companies in several European countries, including Austria, Belgium, the Czech Republic, Denmark, Finland, France, Germany, Hungary, Lithuania, the Netherlands, Poland, Romania, Slovakia and Switzerland, allowed Ukrainian refugees to travel by train for free.

Other refugees traveled by motor vehicles or on foot. In some border crossings, traffic jams of several kilometres long formed. Air travel was not available in Ukraine as the country closed its airspace to civilian flights on the day of the invasion.

=== Staging grounds and border crossings ===
The city of Lviv in the west of Ukraine became a key staging ground for refugees. Shortly after the Russian invasion, up to 100,000 refugees were arriving in the city every day, which prior to the invasion had a population of 700,000. From Lviv, trains transport refugees to border crossing points such as Medyka, Poland and Uzhhorod, close to the border with Slovakia and Hungary. From Medyka, most refugees continue to Przemyśl, Poland, and onward to the rest of Europe.

Other major border crossings included Siret, Romania; Ocnița and Palanca, Moldova; Beregsurány, Hungary and Vyšné Nemecké, Slovakia.

== Number of refugees ==
Number of Ukrainian refugees who left Ukraine after the 2022 invasion as of May 2025 (only countries with more than 10,000 refugees) (Note: Russia has not reported the numbers of Ukrainian refugees to the UNHCR since June 2023 when there were 1.2 million Ukrainians "in refugee-like situation.") *
Country	Number
Germany	1,217,680
Poland	994,180
Czech Republic	374,310
United Kingdom	254,580
Spain	239,670
United States	221,000
Romania	184,500
Italy	173,740
Slovakia	144,110
Moldova	131,490
Netherlands	123,960
Ireland	112,850
Belgium	90,620
Austria	83,430
Norway	81,790
France	74,540
Switzerland	69,870
Hungary	67,200
Portugal	63,690
Bulgaria	60,260
Lithuania	45,610
Belarus	41,970
Estonia	40,470
Denmark	36,690
Sweden	36,590
Greece	34,530
Latvia	31,120
Georgia	30,000
Croatia	26,640
Cyprus	23,490
North Macedonia	20,740
Montenegro	18,560
Slovenia	11,960
Serbia and Kosovo	10,720

Numbers of refugees can change quickly and are often only estimates. Movements from country to country are not necessarily registered officially. Ukrainians are allowed to travel to some countries in Europe without a visa and may be allowed to stay in the country for a longer period, without special permission. Elsewhere, they have to apply for asylum. Due to the Schengen arrangements, having entered any Schengen country, refugees can travel on to other Schengen countries without any visas or border checks.

The United Nations Office for the Coordination of Humanitarian Affairs estimated on 27 February 2022 that in two months there would be 7.5 million internally displaced people in Ukraine, 12 million people would be in need of healthcare and the number of people fleeing the war could reach 4 million. The United Nations High Commissioner for Refugees (UNHCR) stated that the situation was Europe's fastest growing refugee crisis since the Second World War. By early November, according to the UNHCR, the number of Ukrainian refugees recorded across Europe was around 7.8 million. The countries receiving the largest numbers of refugees as of May 2025 were Germany (1.2 million), Poland (1 million), and the Czech Republic (0.4 million).

The communications chief of the UN High Commission for Human Rights called the speed of the exodus of refugees from Ukraine "phenomenal".

A study by the UN agency International Organization for Migration released on 21 March 2022 found that 13.5% of displaced people had also been displaced in 2014–2015. The study found that 60% of refugee households were traveling with children, and of the nearly 10 million people displaced within and outside Ukraine on that date, 186,000 were nationals of a third country.

== Countries ==
=== Neighbouring countries ===
Neighbouring countries are listed in order of the number of refugees who have entered them; others are listed alphabetically.

==== Poland ====
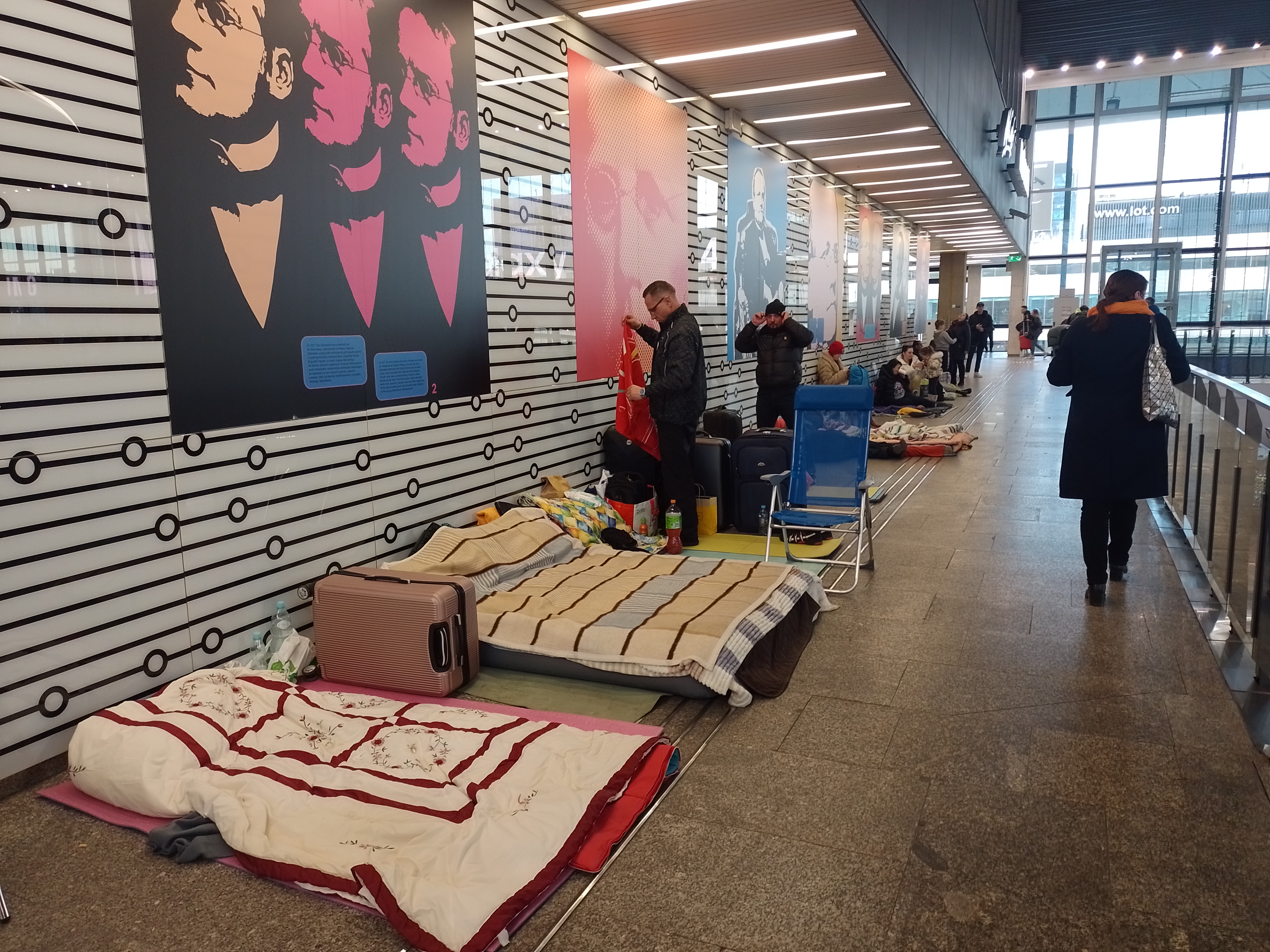
Refugees at Warsaw Central railway station

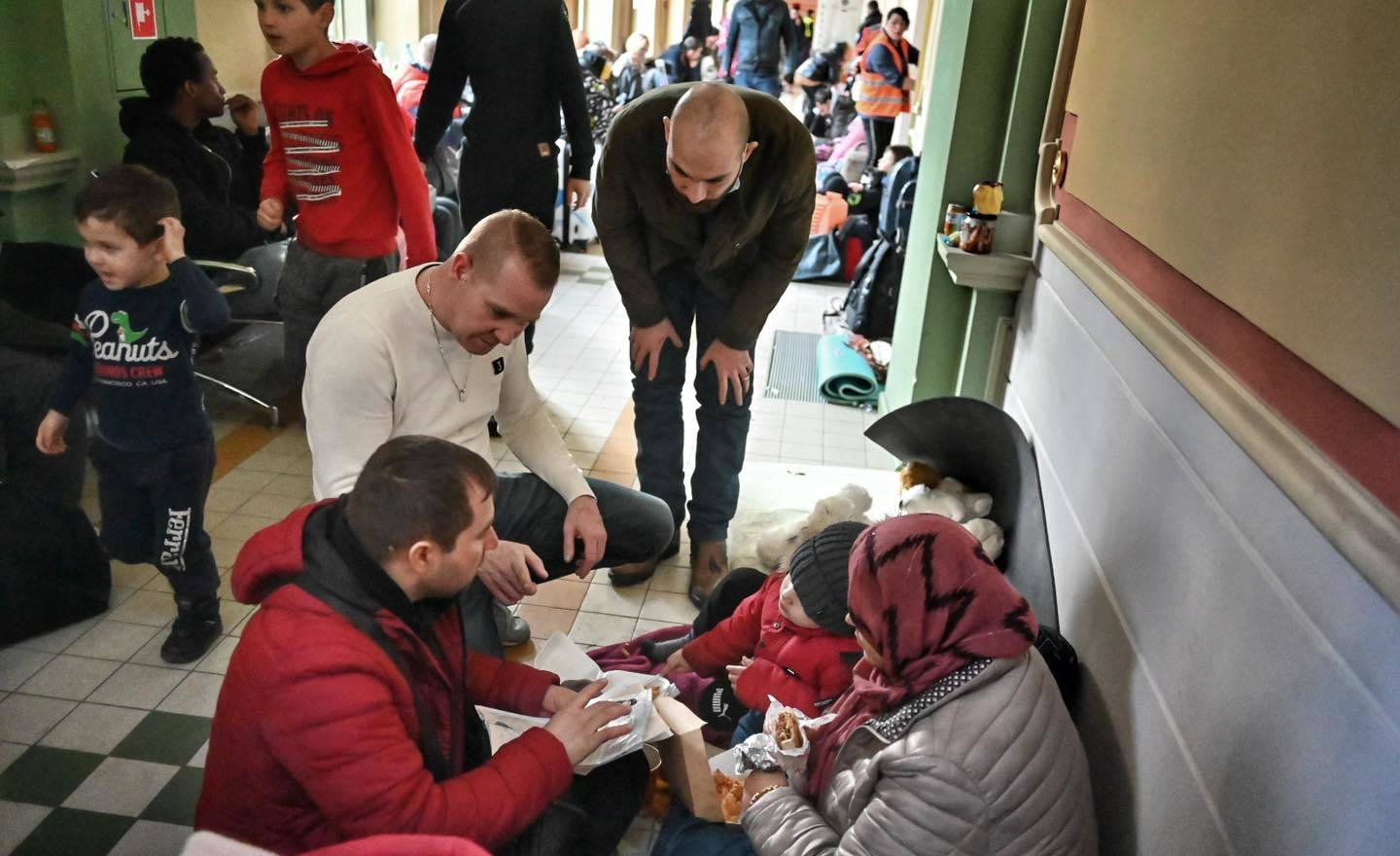
Refugees near Polish-border train station Przemyśl Główny

As early as 15 February 2022, Poland was expecting a possible Russian attack on Ukraine. The Polish government asked communities to prepare for up to a million refugees. By 25 July, more than 1.2 million Ukrainian refugees had been recorded in Poland. Poland greatly reduced the usual border formalities and said that various identity documents would be accepted.

Assembly points for refugees have opened in every district of Poland. Local authorities are providing free accommodation, food, and other necessary supplies. Apart from that, a huge number of citizens and organisations are voluntarily offering assistance, free accommodation and other help. Websites with information for refugees are also in Ukrainian. The government is preparing legal changes that would simplify the employment of Ukrainians in Poland, since currently a working visa is required as Ukrainians are from outside of the EU.

President of the European Council Charles Michel visited the Polish-Ukrainian border crossing on 2 March and praised Polish efforts "to guarantee safe passages for Ukrainians, for European citizens" and those from other countries "without any discrimination." In a later interview for France Inter he denounced alleged claims of racism of Ukrainian and Polish serviceman as "Russian propaganda" and part of Russia's information warfare. (See also § Racial discrimination.) Many observers believe that most are likely to stay in Poland and other Central European countries because "tight labor markets, affordable cities and a pre-existing diaspora have made those countries more appealing alternatives for Ukrainians, who find options slimmer in Europe's west".

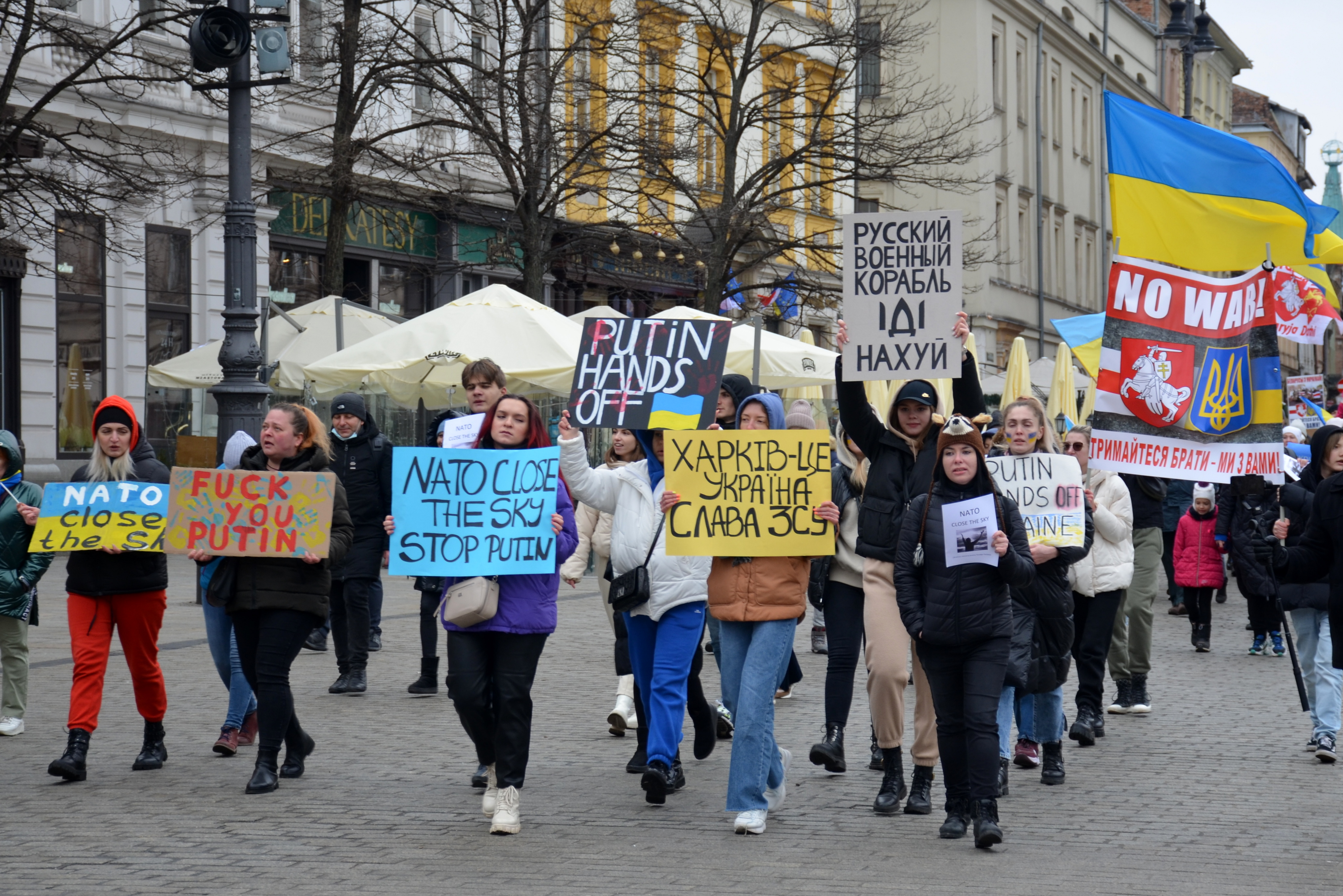
Ukrainian refugees in Kraków protest against the war

The number of refugees arriving to Poland have been unparalleled in Europe. Modelling estimates show that by 1 April, Ukrainian people (including refugees but also those previously living in Poland) made up between 15% and 30% of the population of each of the major Polish cities. For example, Ukrainians accounted for 10% of the total population of Wrocław before the war and this figure had increased to 23% by April 2022.

As of May 2025, there were almost 1 million Ukrainian refugees in Poland. The migration has resulted in a 50% rise in the population of Rzeszów, the largest city in south-eastern Poland. Warsaw's population has increased by 15%, Kraków's by 23%, and Gdańsk's by 34%. Ukrainian refugees have the legal right to reside and work across the European Union. They are also entitled to the same benefits as Poles, including health insurance, free public education, and child allowance.

Less than a month after the invasion, the Polish government established the Aid Fund, run by Bank Gospodarstwa Krajowego, which funds all actions and programs aimed at assisting and integrating Ukrainian refugees. The European Investment Bank has made a €600 million loan to the Aid Fund, after authorizing an initial €2 billion loan in June. The fund is distributed by Bank Gospodarstwa Krajowego (BGK) to local governments and other public bodies that welcome and house Ukrainian migrants.

In January 2025, Polish Prime Minister Donald Tusk supported proposals to reduce benefits for Ukrainian refugees in Poland. From 1 July 2026, Ukrainian refugees, including the elderly, were no longer provided with free refugee accommodation to encourage Ukrainians to return home after four years of support, or to support themselves financially. The cost of the support was estimated at 40 billion złoty (£8 billion).

==== Romania ====
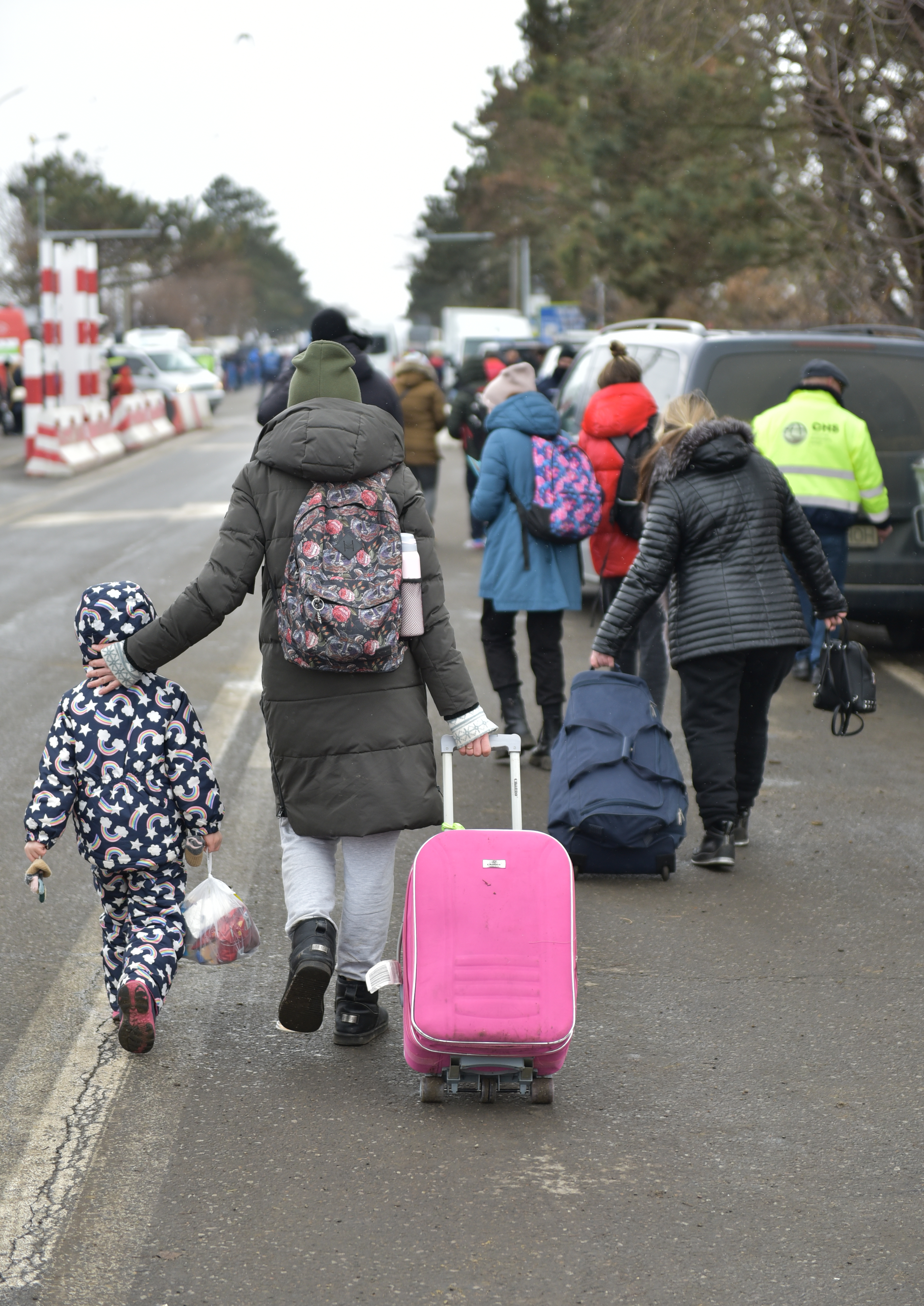
Refugees entering Romania, 5 March 2022

As of 27 May 2022, the Romanian government had reported 989,357 Ukrainians entering Romania. Romanian Defence Minister Vasile Dîncu announced on 22 February 2022 that Romania could receive 500,000 refugees if necessary; the first refugees arrived two days later. On 15 March 2022, Minister of Foreign Affairs Bogdan Aurescu reported that about 80,000 remained in the country.

Some ethnic Romanians are among the Ukrainians who have fled to Romania.

==== Russia ====
At the start of the full-scale war, there was already a large number of Ukrainian refugees in Russia, as more than one million Ukrainians, mainly from Donbas, had fled to Russia between 2014 and 2016.

Estimates of the number of Ukrainian refugees in Russia vary significantly. According to the Russian government 1.2 million Ukrainians were in a "refugee-like situation" in Russia in June 2023. A 2023 report by the Civic Assistance Committee, a Russian human rights organisation, concluded that reliable statistics on refugees do not exist in Russia but estimated the number at approximately 1.2 million based on government payouts to refugees and migration control data.

According to the Ukrainian authorities, Russian troops in the territories of Ukraine occupied by Russia are engaged in the forcible deportation of people from Ukraine to Russia, passing them off as refugees. In March, the Ukrainian foreign ministry alleged that 2,389 Ukrainian children had been abducted from Russian-occupied territory in Donetsk and Luhansk, and transferred to Russia, as well as "several thousand" residents of Mariupol. Near the end of April it was reported that Ukrainian officials believed the number of Ukrainian children forced from eastern Ukraine and entered into the Russian adoption system totalled around 150,000. It had been previously reported by Russian media on that children without parents in Donetsk were being placed with Russian parents through their adoption network.

Amnesty International reported that "The abusive and humiliating process known as 'filtration' is a shocking violation of international human rights and humanitarian law. Our research shows that many displaced Ukrainians end up inside Russia or Russia-occupied territories involuntarily, even if they are not physically forced to move. Deportation and forcible transfer of civilians in occupied territory are prohibited by international humanitarian law and can constitute war crimes or crimes against humanity."

==== Hungary ====
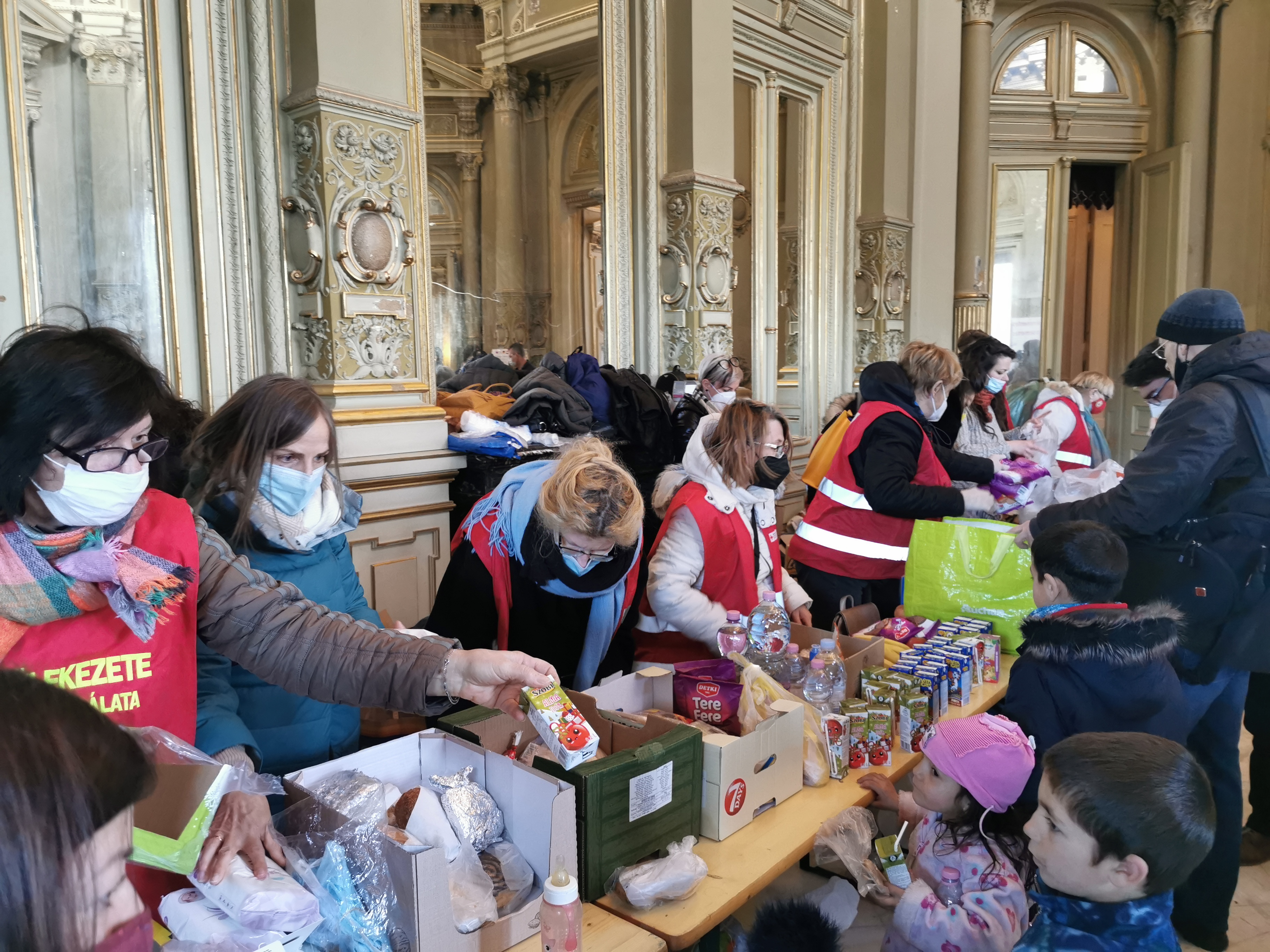
Hungarian volunteers assisting refugees

From the start of the Russian invasion up to 26 July 2022, 1,041,762 refugees from Ukraine had arrived in Hungary. As there are no border checks within the Schengen area, Hungary does not know how many people have moved to other Schengen countries. 500 people from third-party countries arrived by train in Budapest and asked the police for help; these were mostly students or migrant workers from Asia and Africa who had been living in Ukraine.

On 21 August 2024 a law came into force in Hungary, restricting support to those Ukrainian refugees who have come from one of currently 13 regions in Ukraine which are, directly affected by military action. Those from the listed regions remain eligible for state support, which includes free housing and a basic monthly sum. Based on UN refugee agencies estimates, some 2,000 to 3,000 people will lose access to subsidised accommodation and will find it difficult to secure alternative properties to rent. Human rights groups said the worst affected are Roma from the Transcarpathian region, who are living in shelters which will now close.

==== Moldova ====
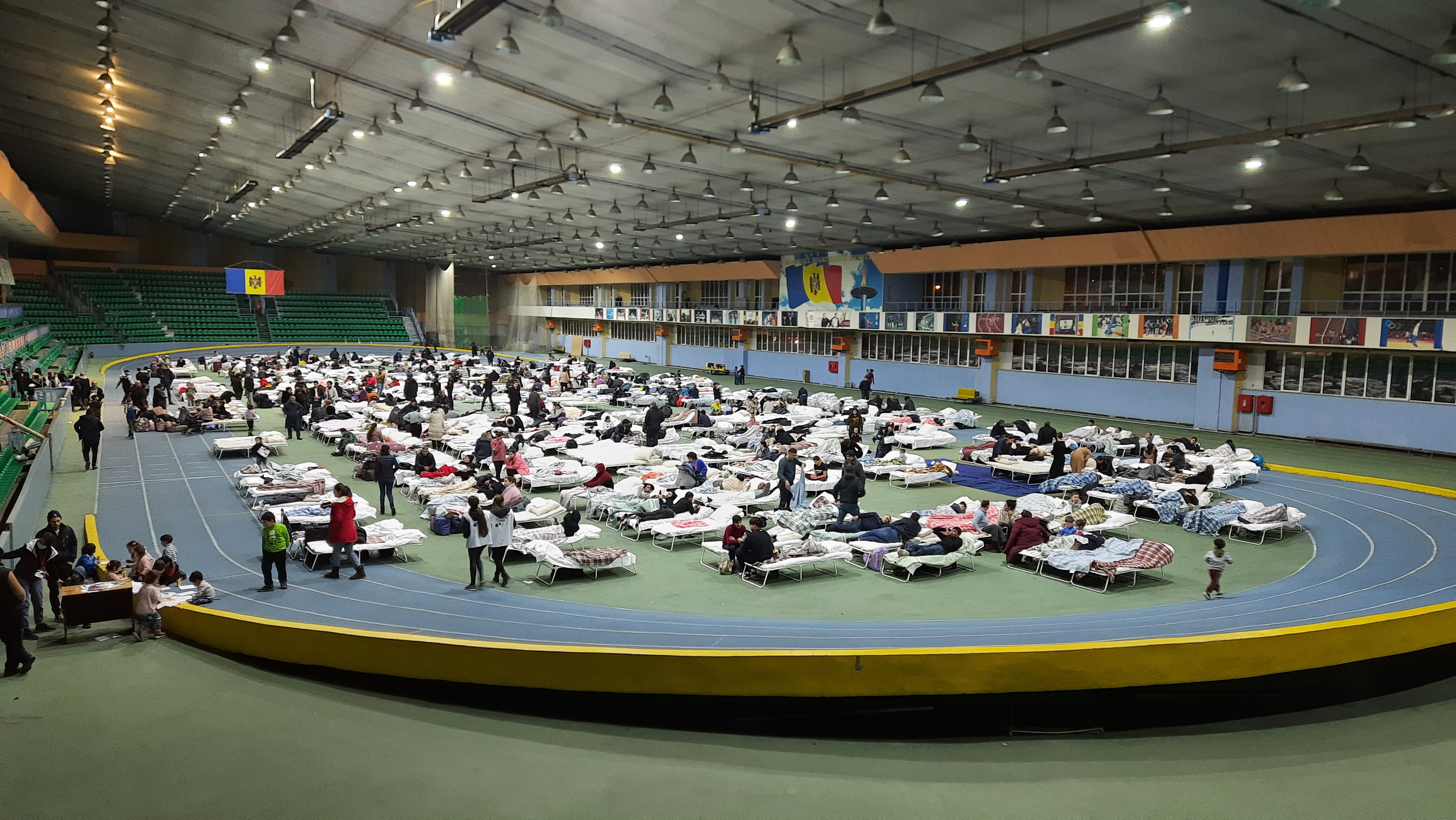
One of the refugee centers set up in Chișinău

Moldova was among the first countries to receive refugees from the Odesa and Vinnytsia regions. Moldovan authorities have activated a centre for crisis management to facilitate accommodation and humanitarian relief for refugees. As of 26 July, 549,333 Ukrainian refugees had entered Moldova. Prime Minister of Moldova Natalia Gavrilița said on 5 April that 100,000 refugees are staying in Moldova, with almost half of them being children. On 11 April, the UN said that Moldova was "hosting an estimated 95,000 Ukrainians." According to Médecins Sans Frontières, the majority of refugees who do not stay continue on to Romania, Poland or other European countries.

Moldova received the highest number of refugees per capita of any country despite being one of Europe's poorest countries. According to Middle East Eye, this has led to social tensions, and international aid was deemed crucial to help Moldovan institutions handle the influx of refugees. On 22 March, the Financial Times estimated that 4% of the Moldovan population were currently refugees, and reported that the government of Moldova had requested financial aid to cope with the emergency. At a conference in Berlin on 5 April, Germany and several partners, including France, Romania and the European Union, agreed to provide €659.5 million in aid to Moldova.

Moldova has a critical view of Russia's invasion, due to its own internal conflict with Russian-backed Transnistria. The government of Moldova is providing free bus rides, and Romania has assisted Moldova with moving people onwards into Romania, in order to relieve the pressure in Moldova. On 12 March, Germany agreed to take 2,500 refugees who were in Moldova. On 5 March, Germany announced it will take an additional 12,000 refugees.

Some Ukrainian refugees have also gone to the unrecognized breakaway state of Transnistria. The state-owned newspaper Novosti Pridnestrovya reported on 4 April that a total of around 27,300 Ukrainian citizens had arrived in Transnistria, of whom 21,000 had applied for temporary residence permits.

==== Slovakia ====
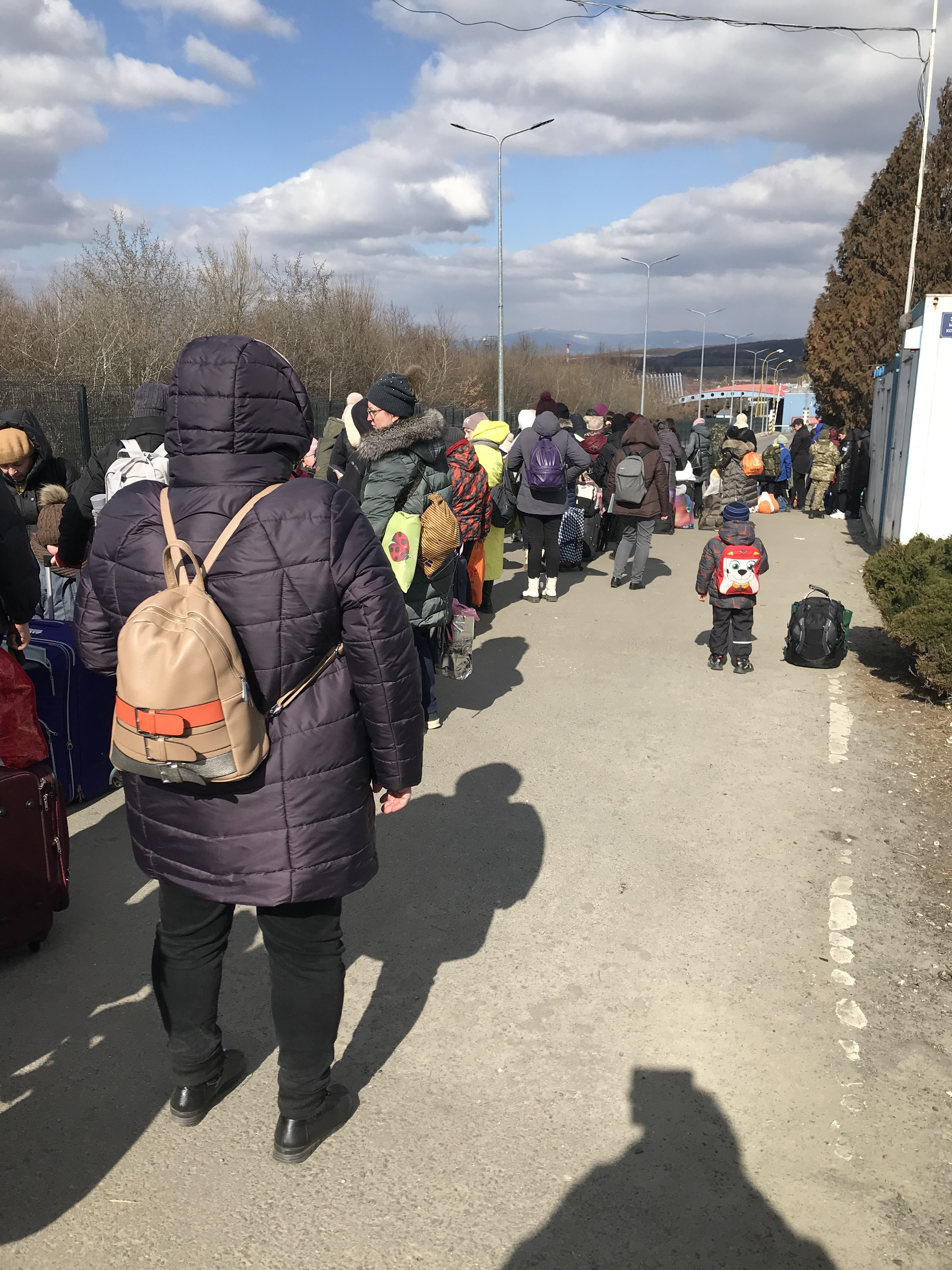
Refugees entering Slovakia on 10 March

As of 8 March 2022, Slovakia had taken in over 140,000 people. By 26 July 2022, 627,555 Ukrainian refugees had entered Slovakia. However, most of the refugees continued further west, mainly to the Czech Republic. About 80,000 refugees have settled so far in Slovakia.

==== Belarus ====
According to Belarusian government figures, 30,092 had gone to Belarus by 29 May 2022.

=== Other European countries ===
==== EU legal framework ====
Ukraine has an Association Agreement with the European Union and since 2017 Ukrainians with biometric passports have had the right to 90 days visa-free stay in the Schengen Area. Following the invasion of Ukraine, the European Commission has called upon member states to authorise the entry and stay of those without biometric passports on humanitarian grounds, and member states had done so since the refugees started to arrive across the borders.

On 4 March 2022, the Council of the EU unanimously agreed to implement the Temporary Protection Directive for the first time in its history, so that refugees fleeing from Ukraine do not have to go through the standard European Union asylum procedure. Temporary protection is an emergency mechanism which gives the right to stay in an EU member state for an initial period of one year, which may be extended for up to a maximum of three years. The beneficiaries enjoy harmonised rights across the EU such as residence, access to the labour market and housing, medical assistance, and access to education for children. The Council did not adopt a system of quotas of displaced persons, but left it to the beneficiaries to choose their destination freely.

==== Austria ====
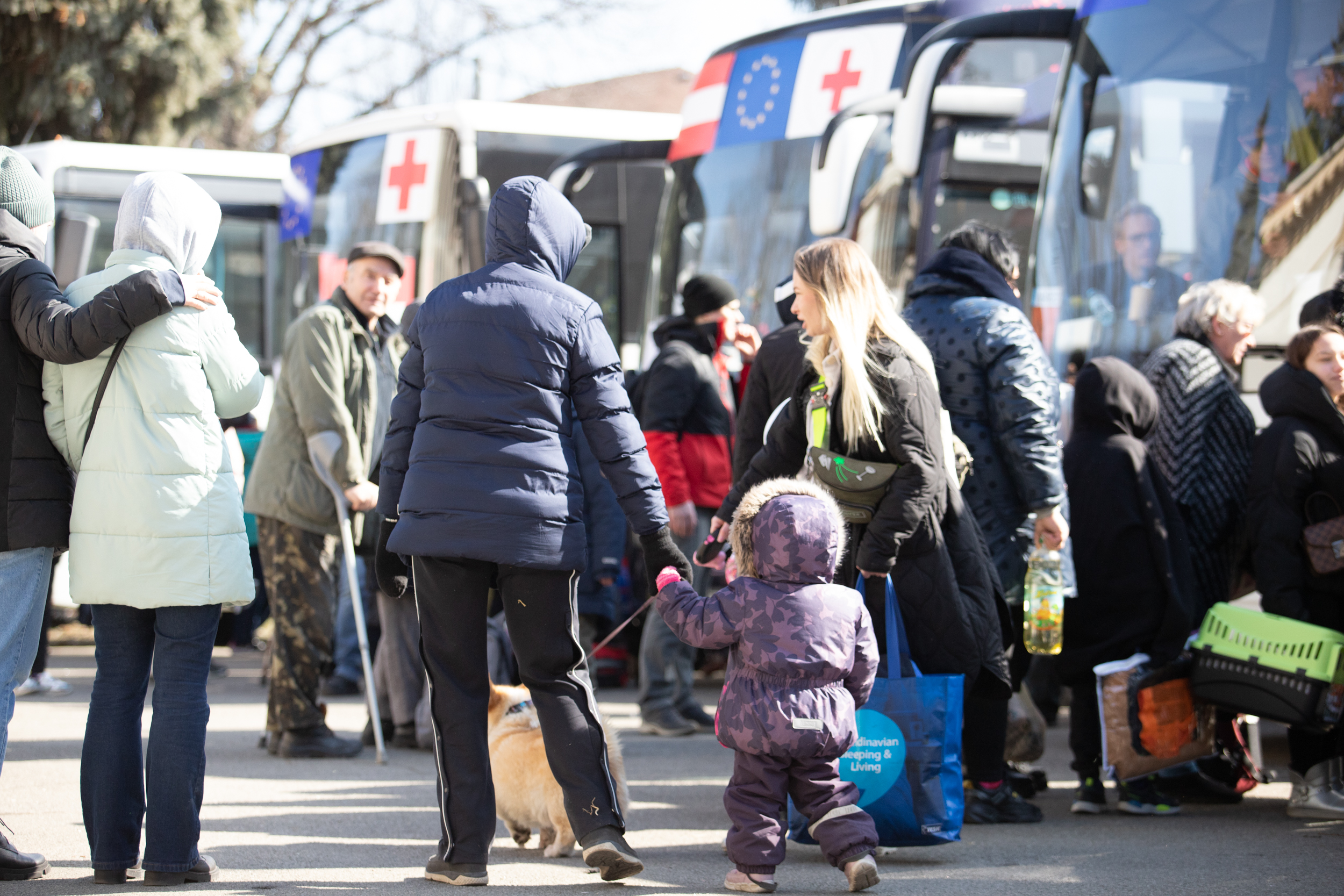
Evacuation of people from vulnerable categories to Austria, 17 March 2022

The Austrian Interior Minister Gerhard Karner from the ÖVP and the Federal Chancellor Karl Nehammer announced that Austria was willing to take in refugees from Ukraine. All refugees are allowed to stay in the country for 90 days. As of March 2022, of 150,000 Ukrainian refugees having arrived in Austria, about 7,000 have applied for asylum, with most proceeding to other countries.

==== Azerbaijan ====
Ukraine is the leading country of origin for the refugee caseload in Azerbaijan, with 4,206 out of the country's officially registered 5,771 refugees being Ukrainians according to UNHCR data as of December 2023.

==== Belgium ====
On 25 February 2022, Belgian State Secretary for Asylum and Migration Sammy Mahdi called for Europe to coordinate the reception. Two days later, Development Minister Meryame Kitir announced that three million euros would be allocated for additional humanitarian aid to Ukraine. By 17 March 2022, 10,000 refugees had registered for temporary protection in Belgium. By 14 April, 30,807 refugees had been registered in Belgium.

==== Bulgaria ====
Up to 5 March 2022, roughly 25,000 Ukrainian refugees had arrived in Bulgaria. By 12 March 2022, their number was nearly 70,000. By 28 March 2022, about 125,500. By 16 April 2022, 185,055 Ukrainian citizens had entered Bulgaria, 87,439 remained in the country, of whom approximately 25,000 were children. The chairman of the State Agency for Refugees told the Bulgarian National Radio that as of 24 August 2022, 91,903 Ukrainian refugees remained in Bulgaria, with nearly 40% of them being children.

==== Croatia ====
From the start of the Russian invasion to 4 September 2022, 21,676 Ukrainian refugees entered Croatia, of whom over 49.9% were women, over 33.5% children and nearly 16.6% men.

==== Cyprus ====
By 9 March 2022, around 3,000 Ukrainian refugees had entered Cyprus since the day after the Russian invasion, the Cypriot interior ministry reported; 19 of these had sought asylum. By April 2022, their number was around 10,000, while by April 2023 it had reached 17,000. According to Eurostat, Cyprus had the highest ratio across EU member states of Ukrainian citizens granted temporary protection for February 2023. In April 2024 the number was 18,500.

==== Czech Republic ====
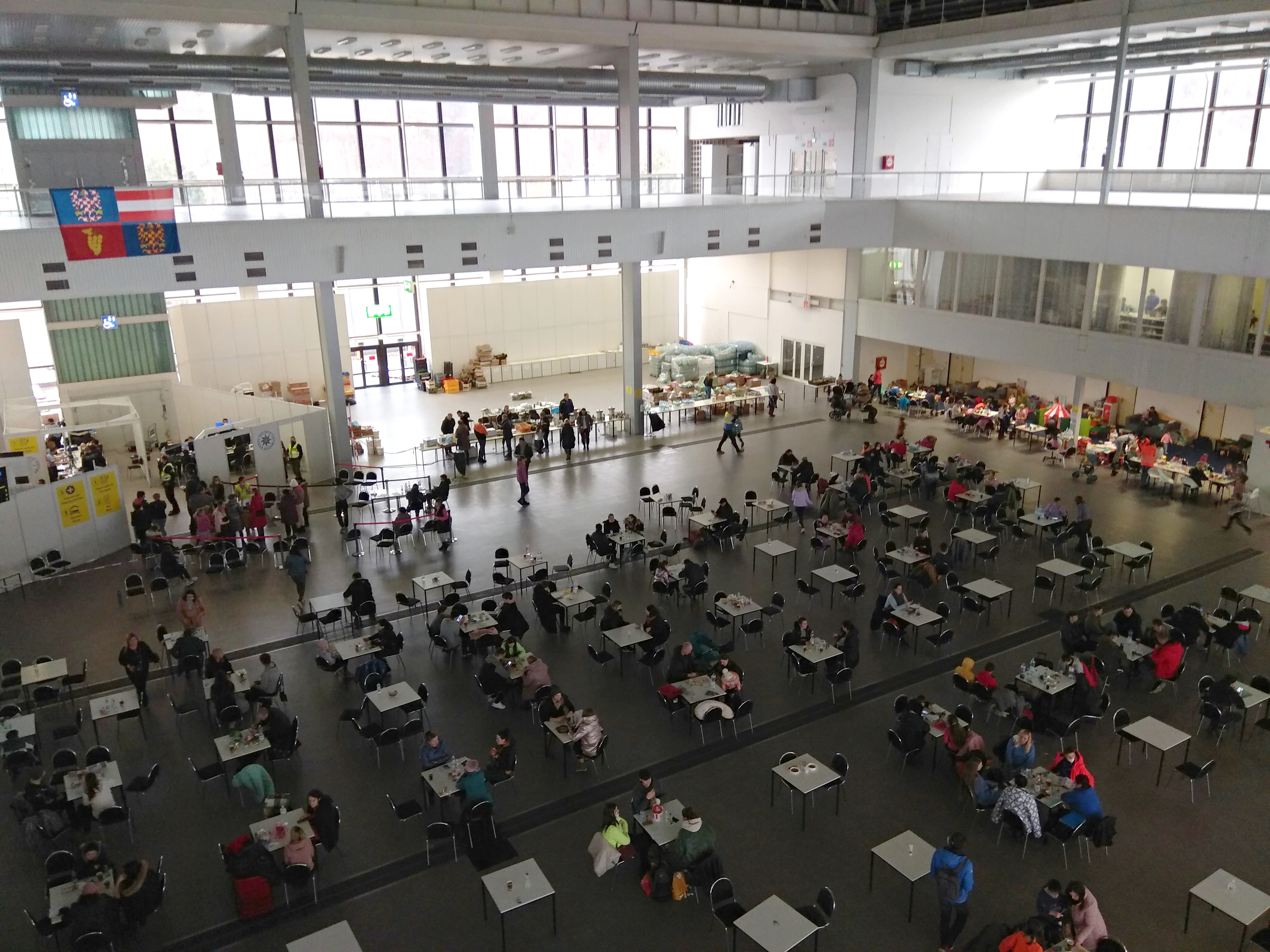
Ukrainian refugees in Brno, Czech Republic

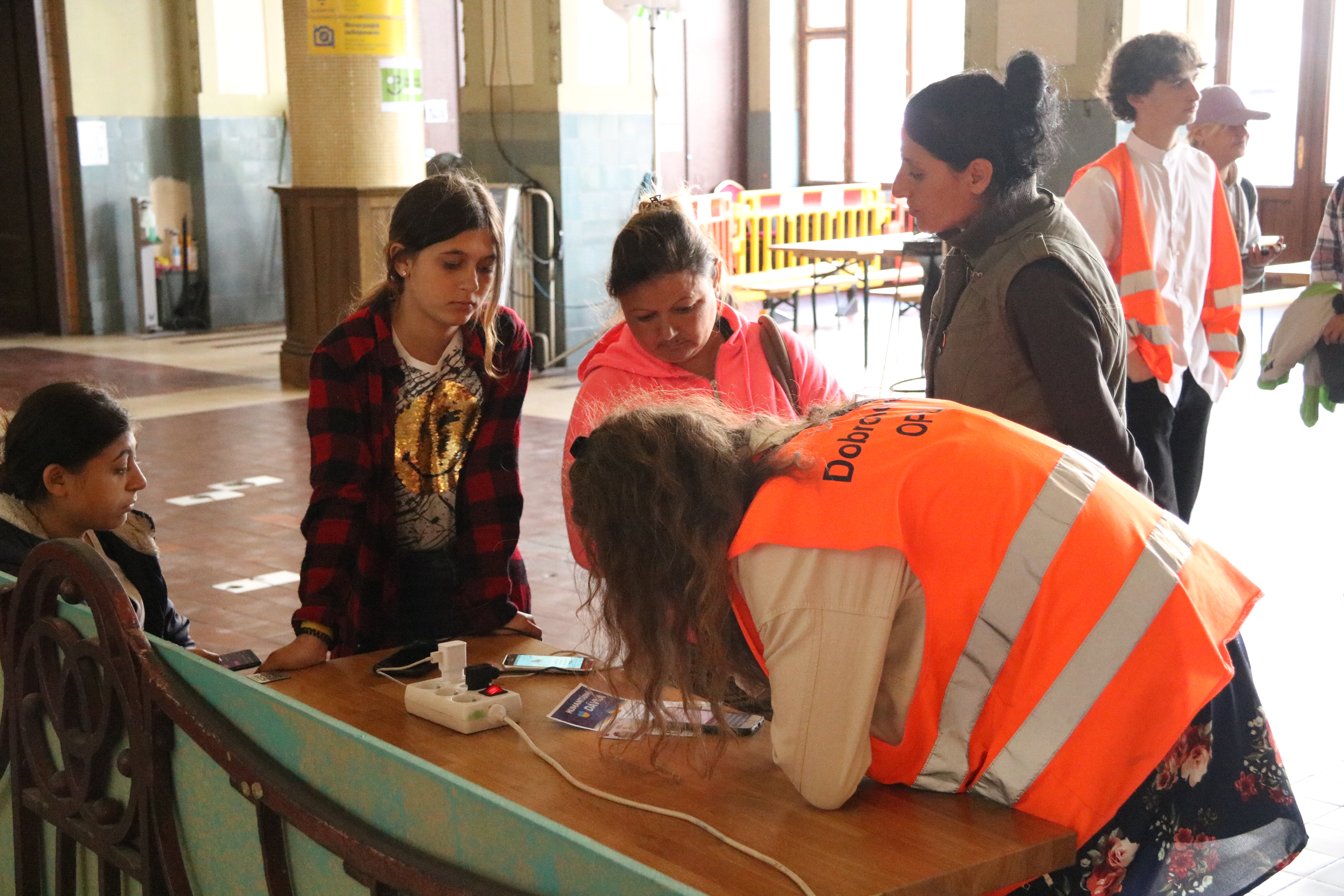
Volunteers providing help to refugees at Praha Hlavní nádraží

The Czech Republic is providing financial, humanitarian and other types of aid to Ukrainian refugees as well as state accommodation and free education for their children. The Czech Republic had received over 100,000 Ukrainian refugees by 7 March 2022, approximately 200,000 by 10 March 2022, over 270,000 by 17 March 2022, with the number rising to over 300,000 by 23 March 2022 and relatively slower rise afterwards. By 1 April 2023, altogether 504,107 Ukrainian individuals had been granted temporary protection in the country, of whom 325,742 had applied for extension of their refugee status beyond March 2023. 68% of the refugees were of working age, of whom 65% were female and 35% male, 28% were children and 4% elderly. In summer 2022, the country hosted the largest number of Ukrainian refugees per capita of any European country.

A network of Regional Centres for Help and Assistance to Ukraine (Krajská asistenční centra pomoci Ukrajině) was created in the regional capitals of the country to help refugees obtain registration, accommodation, health insurance or other assistance. On 17 March 2022, a law known as Lex Ukrajina was passed by Parliament to make it easier for refugees to obtain residence permits and access healthcare, which was followed by passing four follow-up laws in the following year.

Also on 17 March 2022, some media, including Associated Press and BBC News, incorrectly reported that the Czech Prime Minister had said: "Czech Republic can no longer accept refugees from Ukraine". However, someone had mistranslated his Czech quote: "We are at the very limit of what we are capable of absorbing without any major problems (...) we must continue in the steps that will allow us to cope with more high numbers". The BBC later corrected the mistranslation.

As of May 2025, there were around 374,000 Ukrainian refugees in the Czech Republic.

==== Denmark ====
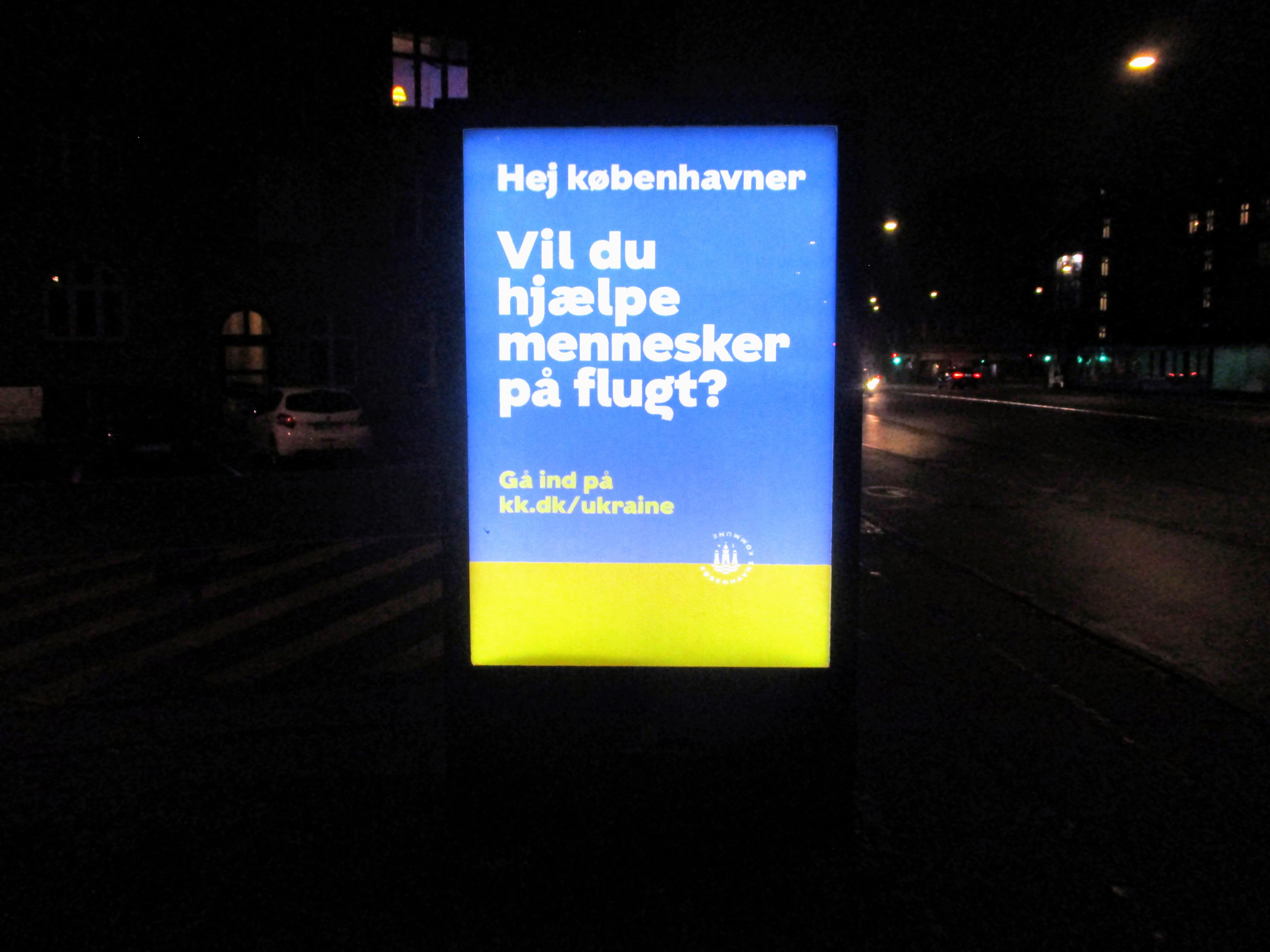
A poster in Copenhagen advertising a municipal Ukrainian refugee help page

By 25 March 2022, the Danish authorities had registered around 24,000 Ukrainians as having arrived in Denmark, with roughly half being children. Because of the visa-free rules for Ukrainians and the borders being largely open, with only sporadic controls, the exact number is unknown. The authorities have projected that the number may eventually surpass 100,000 if the war is drawn out. Ukrainian citizens, their close relatives and non-Ukrainians that already had refugee status in Ukraine can receive a two-year residence permit (with the possibility of extension) without having to first request asylum. By 1 April 2022, about 30,000 refugees had reached Denmark according to the authorities amid expectations that the number will rise to around 40,000 after Easter.

==== Estonia ====
By 18 March 2022, 25,190 refugees, of whom over a third were children, had arrived in Estonia. Of the total, 6,437 refugees were transiting, leaving 18,753 who planned to stay in Estonia. By 31 March 2022, 25,347 refugees, of whom about 40 percent were children had entered Estonia. The government received 13,289 applications for temporary protection.

By 3 July 2022, 49,016 Ukrainian refugees had entered Estonia.

==== Finland ====
From the start of the Russian invasion up to 30 March 2022, around 15,000 Ukrainian refugees had entered Finland according to the Finnish Immigration Service.

==== France ====
On 10 March 2022, the Interior Ministry reported that 7,251 people had arrived in France from Ukraine, 6,967 of whom were Ukrainian nationals. By 16 March, at least 17,000 Ukrainian refugees had entered France, according to French interior minister Gérald Darmanin. On 24 March 2022, Prime Minister Jean Castex visiting the new reception center for Ukrainian refugees in Nice on Thursday, and said that 30,000 Ukrainian refugees had entered France since 25 February. As of 30 March 2022, about 45,000 Ukrainians, mainly women and children, had arrived in France.

As of 27 April 2022, more than 70,000 refugees were benefiting from the subsidy for asylum seekers (Ada) in France, and by 24 May 2022, more than 85,000 according to the French Office for Immigration and integration. By 29 May 2022, this figure was believed to be around 93,000. The number was expected to reach 100,000 during June 2022 said prefect Joseph Zimet, As of 4 July, more than 100,000 refugees were benefiting from the subsidy for asylum seekers (Ada) in France.

A portal called "Je m'engage pour l'Ukraine" (I am committed to Ukraine) was launched with state support, aiming to coordinate help from French citizens.

The French portal to help Ukrainian citizens who choose France has changed its name "Pour l'Ukraine" - "For Ukraine" in French. France is fully in solidarity with the Ukrainians and mobilized to facilitate their reception in France. The "Pour l'Ukraine" portal offers all the useful information to support them in their first days in France. It also allows citizens wishing to mobilize alongside them, to access devices near their homes.

Polls conducted shortly after the invasion began showed that 85% of the French public were in favour of helping Ukrainian refugees.

==== Georgia (Note: Including Asian Georgia) ====
Georgia suffered similar experiences during the Russo-Georgian War and Georgians have thus been generous towards the people of Ukrainian refugees. According to the UN Refugee Agency data, as of January 2023, Georgia officially recorded 25,101 Ukrainian refugees but the full number of unregistered Ukrainians in the country is unknown.

Georgia has also opened facilities in several cities for Ukrainian children so they could learn in their own language. The Georgian government has set up shelters for Ukrainians has sent up to 1,000 tons of humanitarian aid to the country and "shelters up to 28,000 Ukrainians" said Prime Minister Irakli Garibashvili on 27 May 2022. He noted the Government has allocated US$7 million to care for the Ukrainian refugees, and will allot the same amount for aid to Ukraine through 2022.

==== Germany ====
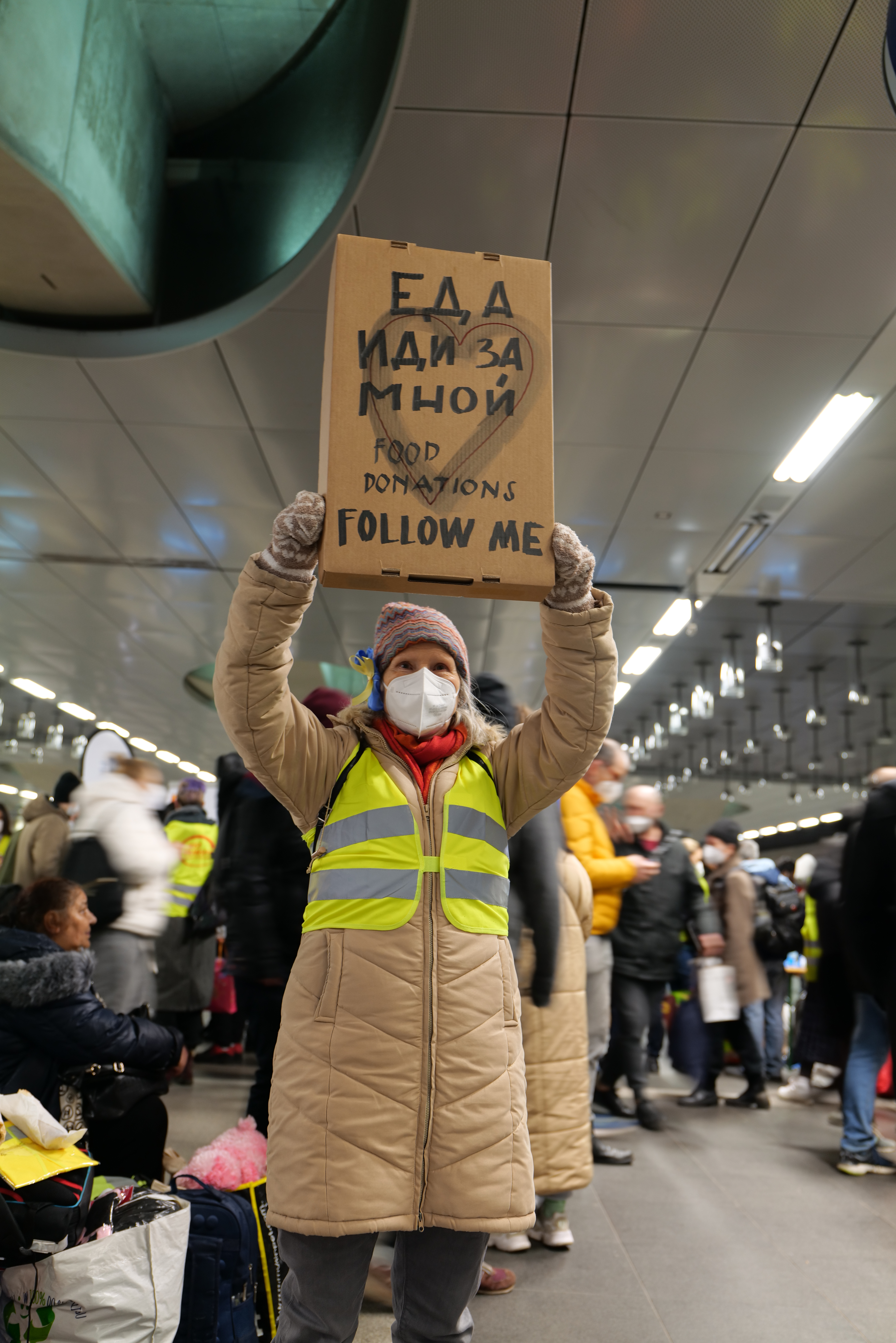
A volunteer holding a sign to guide refugees at Berlin's rail station

The first refugees from Ukraine arrived in Brandenburg on the evening of 25 February 2022, and the state was initially preparing for some 10,000 people. Other states of Germany pledged their help. In addition, Mecklenburg-Vorpommern decided to stop the forced return of people to Ukraine.

On 8 March 2022, a legal norm was enacted (Ukraine-Aufenthalts-Übergangsverordnung), which temporarily legalizes the entry and residence of Ukrainians and third-country nationals in Germany who were legally resident in Ukraine at the beginning of the Russian attack on 24 February.

Deutsche Bahn, the German national railway company, allowed refugees with a Ukrainian passport or ID card to travel free of charge on long-distance trains from Poland to Germany. The company also gave out free tickets to refugees who wanted to continue to another destination; by 17 March, more than 100,000 had been issued. The Association of German Transport Companies decided to also cancel charges for all short-distance travel with buses and trains for Ukrainian refugees within Germany.

German media debated whether there was a difference in the portrayal of refugees from Ukraine compared to those from other countries, particularly those arriving during the 2015 European migrant crisis.

According to the Federal Ministry of the Interior and Community, 37,786 war refugees from Ukraine had registered in Germany by midday on 6 March 2022; by 14 March the number had reached almost 147,000. By 23 March 2022, almost 239,000 refugees had entered Germany. The interior ministry said that by 10 March 2022, 300,000 private homes had offered accommodation. Temporary shelters were built in places such as the former Berlin Tegel Airport and Terminal 5 of Berlin Brandenburg Airport.

As of May 2025, there were more than 1.2 million Ukrainian refugees in Germany.

==== Greece ====
On 1 March 2022, the Greek government was considering evacuating the 100,000 ethnic Greeks from Mariupol and its surrounding area. Many early refugees were from Ukraine's sizeable ethnic Greek community. By 4 April 2022, over 16,700 Ukrainian refugees had arrived in Greece of whom 5,117 were minors according to government officials.

==== Iceland ====
Between 1 January and 25 April 2022, 845 Ukrainians applied for asylum in Iceland. More may have arrived already, who have not yet applied for asylum. As of 13 April 2022, 748 Ukrainians had applied for asylum, of whom 26 percent were under the age of 18.

==== Ireland ====
In early March 2022, the Irish government announced that it expected to receive over 100,000 refugees. However this was later increased to 200,000. 21,000 refugees had arrived by 11 April 2022, of whom about 13,000 were being accommodated in State-provided accommodation. Government expect 40,000 Ukrainians by the end of April. By mid-November 2022, over 58,000 Ukrainians had come to Ireland, equivalent to over 1% of the population of Ireland. November 2022 also saw the beginning of the Irish anti-immigration protests, which saw pockets of protests against the arrival of refugees. As of March 2023, almost 60,000 Ukrainians had been provided with state accommodation. Roderic O'Gorman, the Minister for Children, Equality, Disability, Integration and Youth said he "accepts" the shortage of accommodation, which was brought up by some protestors.

==== Italy ====
Up to 9 March 2022, 23,872 Ukrainian refugees had arrived in Italy, according to Prime Minister Mario Draghi, mainly arriving via the Italian-Slovenian border. By 12 March, three days later, this number had increased to 34,851. By 7 April, the number was 86,066, and 137,385 by 21 June.

Starting from March 2022, assets seized from the mafia by the Italian government have begun housing Ukrainian refugees.

==== Latvia ====
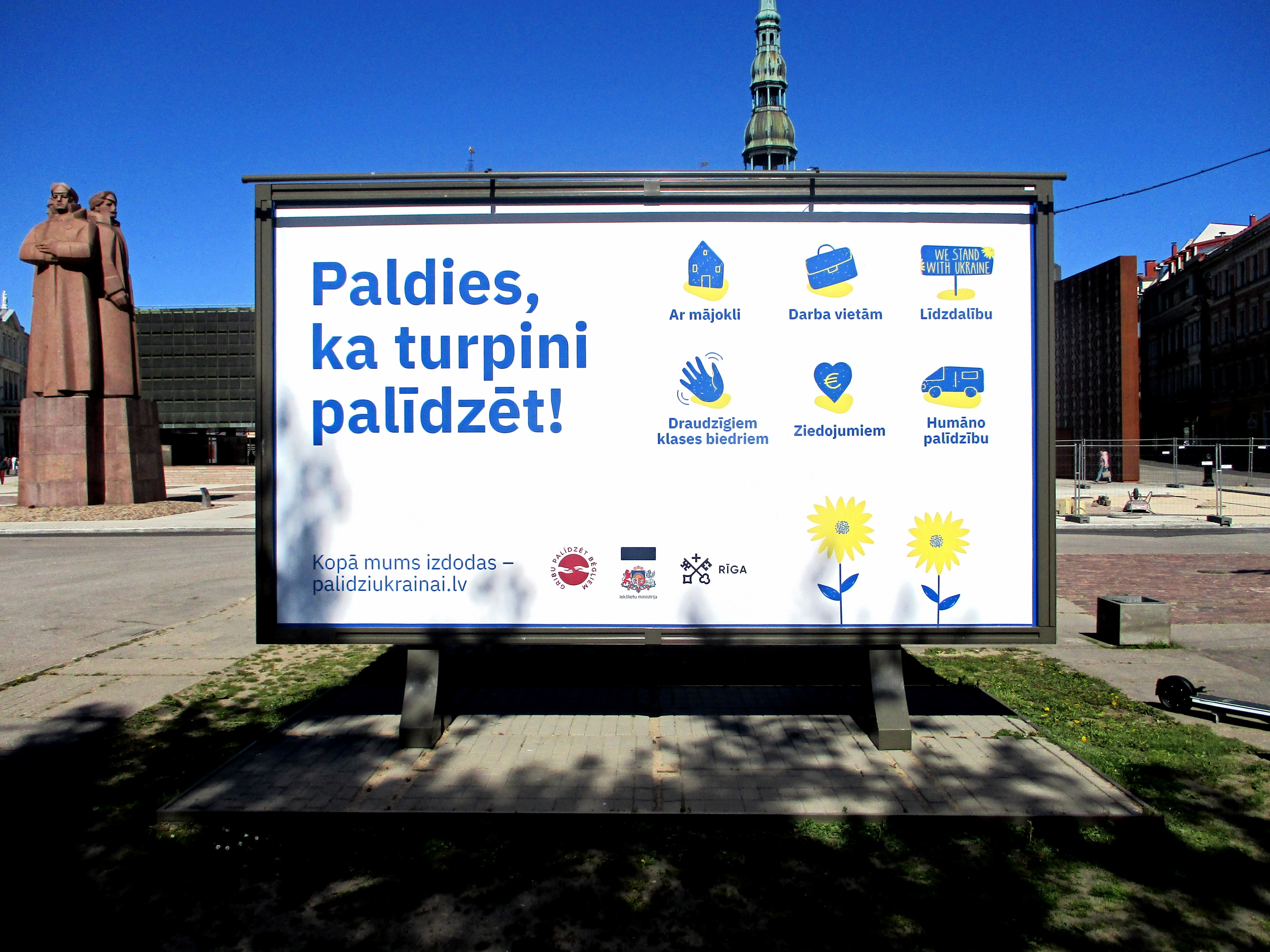
A billboard at the Latvian Riflemen Square in Riga thanking people for the continued support to Ukrainians and Ukraine.

The Latvian Interior Ministry had prepared a plan in case of a large influx of people from Ukraine as early as 14 February. On 24 February 2022, the government approved a contingency plan to receive and accommodate approximately 10,000 refugees from Ukraine. Several non-governmental organizations, municipalities, schools and other institutions also pledged to provide accommodation. On 27 February, around 20 volunteer professional drivers departed to Lublin with supply donations, bringing Ukrainian refugees on their way back.

The first refugees began arriving on 26 February 2022, and by 2 March Latvia had taken in more than 1,000 Ukrainian refugees. On 2 March, an official designated portal in Latvian, Ukrainian, English and Russian called "Ukraine to Latvia" was launched, and on 7 March 2022, with 3,000 to 4,000 Ukrainian refugees having arrived in Latvia, a Ukrainian refugee help center was opened in the Riga Congress Hall. By 9 March 2022, humanitarian visas had been issued to 67 Ukrainian citizens. To deal with the increasingly large numbers of refugees, a second Ukrainian refugee help center is scheduled to be opened in the former building of Riga Technical University on 14 March. As of 20 March, 6,253 Ukrainian refugees are registered in Riga. From the start of the Russian invasion up to 23 March 2022, 12,000 Ukrainian refugees had entered Latvia. From the start of the Russian invasion up to 5 June, 31,960 Ukrainian refugees had entered Latvia.

==== Lithuania ====
From the start of the Russian invasion up to 23 May 2022, almost 53,700 Ukrainian refugees had entered Lithuania, including 21,300 children, of whom almost 5,600 were under the age of six as well as 2,500 Ukrainian refugees aged 65 and over.

==== Luxembourg ====
The Ministry of Foreign Affairs of Luxembourg welcomed the European regulations and in early March 2022 set up a "first reception centre" in Luxembourg City. As of April 2022, around 5,000 Refugees were in Luxembourg.

==== Netherlands ====
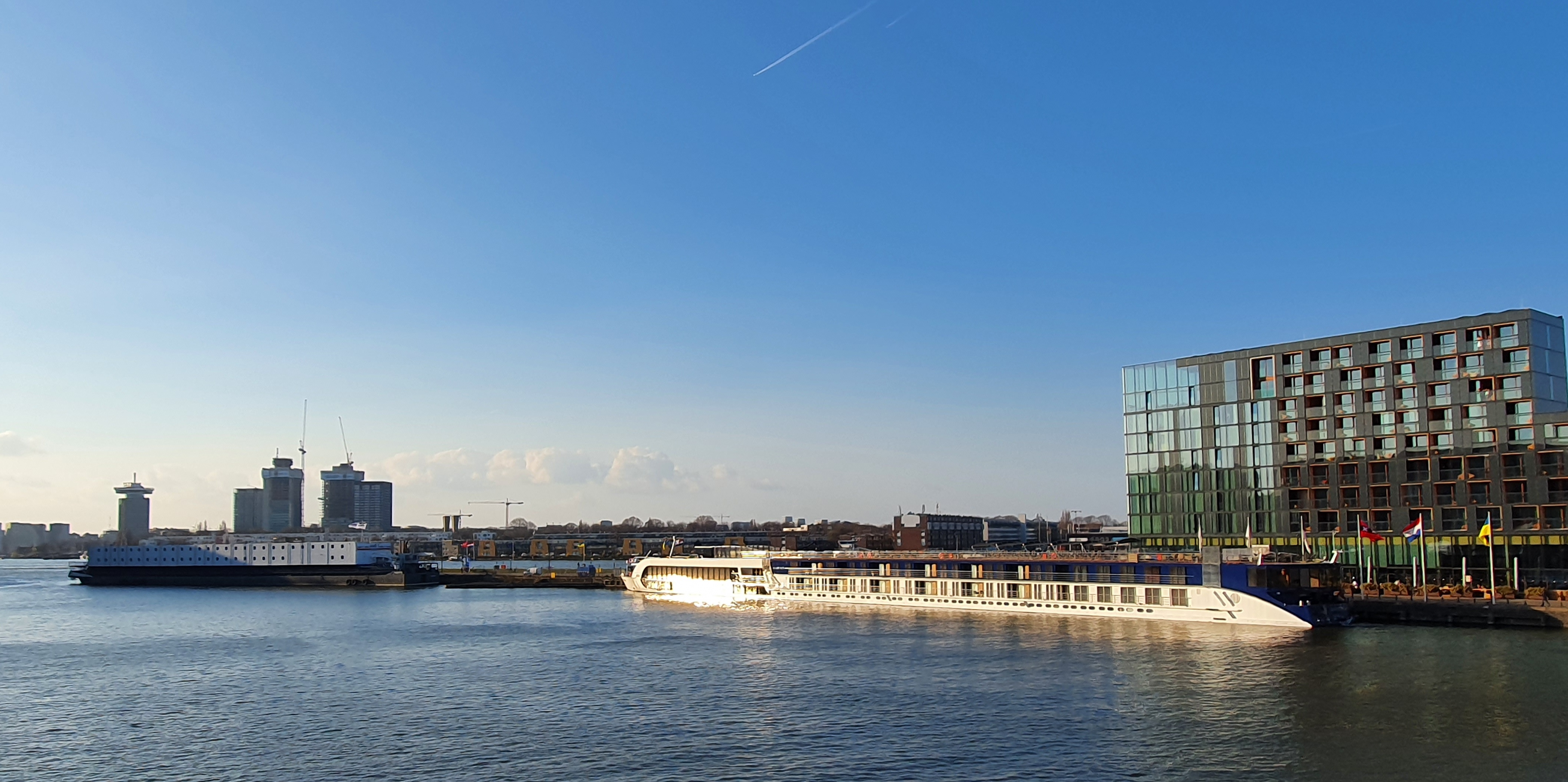
Ships at the Java-eiland

Prior to the invasion, Ukrainians in search of safety could already fly to the Netherlands and stay for three months. During this time, they had to find their own accommodation as asylum centers were already "overcrowded". State Secretary for Migration Eric van der Burg said that the principle had always been emphasized that refugees should be received in their own region, if possible but that "now Europe is the region." As of 27 February 2022, fewer than 50 refugees had arrived in the Netherlands from Ukraine.

However, by 8 March 2022, 325 Ukrainian refugees had arrived in Rotterdam alone. A local official said that Rotterdam would receive more Ukrainians than the thousand who had been initially expected, "our people are working hard to find places, and they won't stop at a thousand."

The Dutch cabinet wanted to ensure 50,000 places for refugees from Ukraine according to a letter from Justice and Security Minister Yesilgöz, "the safety regions will coordinate the implementation, together with municipalities, of reception locations for at least 1,000 refugees from Ukraine per region within two weeks". Then, in a third phase, the same number would again be admitted.

By 16 March 2022, the municipality of Amsterdam had acquired ships harboured in the Java-eiland to lodge 300 refugees as a way to extend their existing capability.

By late December 2022, 85,210 refugees from Ukraine were registered in the Netherlands.

==== Norway ====
Ukrainian refugees have received free public transport. Ruter, Oslo's public transport authority, has provided free rides since 4 March 2022. Vy, a railway company, provides free train rides to reception centres. Vestland county also provide free public transport.

==== Portugal ====
As of 25 April 2022, Portugal had received 33,106 refugees from Ukraine. The majority of the refugees are Ukrainian citizens, while 5% are non-Ukrainian nationals living in Ukraine at the time of the invasion. There were 22,208 women refugees, 10,898 men and 11,410 minors. As of 6 April 2022, 350 minors had arrived without a parent or legal guardian. In most cases, these minors arrived with close relatives, but 16 of them arrived unaccompanied; this number rose to 45 by 7 April 2022. As of 29 March 2022, 1,800 Portuguese families had offered to provide foster care. The Portuguese authorities expect to find next-of-kin for the majority, and only a tiny number will need permanent adoption.

Before the 2022 invasion, Portugal already had 27,200 Ukrainian immigrants. As a result of the crisis, the Ukrainian immigrant community has become the second-largest in Portugal, almost doubling to over 52,000 in the month of March. That community helped in organizing the transport of refugees.

By 6 April 2022, 2,115 Ukrainian refugee children had been enrolled in Portuguese public schools, up from over 600 on 22 March. Employment wise, as of 6 April 2022, 359 refugees had been hired, 4,261 registered as looking for work and 2,880 enrolled in Portuguese classes. As of 6 April, Portuguese social security had processed 1,412 requests from Ukrainian refugees. The Portuguese government reiterated that it had set no limit for Ukrainian refugees.

==== Serbia ====
As of 25 July 2022, there were 17,875 Ukrainian refugees in Serbia according to the Office of the United Nations High Commissioner for Human Rights.

==== Slovenia ====
From the start of the Russian invasion up to 23 March 2022, more than 3,000 Ukrainian refugees had entered Slovenia, by 28 March 2022, more than 7,000 Ukrainian refugees had entered Slovenia, and by 15 April 2022, this number had risen to 18,415 though the majority were not remaining in Slovenia.

==== Spain ====
Spain announced that 100,000 Ukrainian citizens already living in the country would be fully legalized. This would allow them to "work legally, so that they can access education, health and social policies" said Prime Minister Pedro Sánchez. Several other authorities from local to central administration stated the willingness to accept more Ukrainian refugees. On 31 March 2022, Prime Minister Sánchez announced that 30,000 Ukrainian refugees had officially been granted the temporary protection status, but expected that number to increase to 70,000 in the next days. Many of the refugees were staying with relatives or friends and had not yet notified the authorities.

The Spanish Ministry of Inclusion, Social Security and Migration enabled reception, attention and relocation centres (CREADE) for Ukrainian refugees in Pozuelo de Alarcón, Barcelona, Alicante and Málaga, resolving around 40,000 applications for temporary protection over the course of the first three weeks of the conflict.

As of 2025, there were 209,592 Ukrainian-born persons living in Spain.

==== Sweden ====
By January 2025, Sweden had received about 50,000 Ukrainian refugees since Russia's invasion of Ukraine on 24 February 2022. In January 2023, 8500 of them had left Sweden again. Meanwhile, new refugees continued to arrive, and by January 2025, there were 46.500 Ukrainian refugees in Sweden. These refugees are covered by the EU's Mass Refugee Directive, which grants them temporary residence permits until 4 March 2026.

Ukrainian refugees in Sweden have faced significant challenges in adapting to their new lives, including language barriers, difficulties accessing healthcare, and finding employment. There have been concerns about the risk of labor exploitation among Ukrainian refugees, particularly due to their vulnerable legal and economic situation. There have also been reports indicating that female Ukrainian refugees have been subjected to sexual exploitation.

However, their situation has gradually improved. There have been positive developments in almost all aspects. For example, there has been an increase in the rates of employment and the proportion of Ukrainian refugees who have acquired Swedish language skills. Many Ukrainians are content with their life in Sweden and grateful for the support they have received. Since November 2024, new regulations have allowed a large group that was previously ineligible to now register as residents. This means, among other things, that they have broader access to healthcare services beyond the emergency services that were initially provided.

==== Switzerland ====
Prior to the invasion, Swiss laws already allowed any Ukrainian citizen with a biometric passport to enter Switzerland without a visa and to stay for up to three months. On 28 February 2022, Justice Minister Karin Keller-Sutter announced that from then on refugees without passports could enter too and staying in the country would no longer be time limited. The federal government and the cantons committed to providing accommodation for 9,000 refugees. On 11 March, the head of the Justice ministry Karin Keller-Sutter said that 2,100 refugees had already been registered in Switzerland and up to 60,000 refugees could arrive in total. As of 5 April, 24,837 refugees had been registered and 18,149 of them had already received S permits. By October 2022, there were about 70,000 refugees in Switzerland.

In August 2025 the Swiss State Secretariat for Migration (SEM) issued an internal security assessment of seven western Ukrainian oblasts (Volyn, Rivne, Lviv, Ternopil, Zakarpattia, Ivano-Frankivsk and Chernivtsi). The report, drawing on ACLED and UN data up to July 2025, found these rear-zone areas under full Ukrainian control experience only sporadic Russian long-range air and drone strikes, with “very low civilian casualties” (defined in the report as 0-9 deaths and 7–83 injuries per oblast in the preceding 12 months). Based on this assessment, the Swiss government ruled on 8 October 2025 that refugee returns to these seven oblasts are generally reasonable. Effective 1 November 2025, new applicants for temporary Protection Status (Status S) from these regions are generally ineligible for automatic collective protection and must apply through the regular asylum procedure. Existing Status S holders remain unaffected.

==== United Kingdom ====
Britain had issued about 1,000 visas by 13 March 2022 and was criticised for placing too many bureaucratic obstacles to entry to the UK for refugees by both international and UK sources, and for only granting admission to refugees who already had family in the UK. On 4 March 2022, the United Kingdom announced that British nationals and Ukrainian residents of the UK would be allowed to bring in members of their extended family from Ukraine. Prime Minister Boris Johnson stated that the country could take in 200,000 Ukrainian refugees. On 7 March 2022, French Interior Minister Gerald Darmanin said that many Ukrainian refugees had been turned away by British officials in Calais and told to obtain visas at UK consulates in Paris or Brussels. Emmanuel Macron also criticised the United Kingdom for not helping Ukrainian refugees enough, specifically criticising Britain's visa policy which required applicants to apply for visas in person in Brussels or Paris before entering Britain.

On 12 March 2022, Michael Gove announced the "Homes for Ukraine" scheme whereby Britons who offered their home to Ukrainian refugees would receive £350 a month.

On 28 March 2022, the Home Office announced it had issued 21,600 visas under the Ukraine Family Scheme, under which refugees could join close family members already resident in the UK. The government was criticised however for the slow and bureaucratic procedures in the "Homes for Ukraine" scheme previously announced by Gove. The heads of the Refugee Council, the British Red Cross, Save the Children and Oxfam made a statement warning that the system was "causing great distress to already traumatised Ukrainians". 2,500 applications for visas under this scheme had been approved by 30 March 2022. In April 2022, The Times revealed that female refugees may be at risk of being exploited by UK men offering to be their hosts, with some proposing sexual relationship or even marriage. On 13 April 2022, UNHCR asked the United Kingdom to stop pairing single British men with lone Ukrainian women refugees under the "Homes for Ukraine" scheme because the women were at risk of sexual exploitation.

By 8 April 2022, a total of 12,000 Ukrainian refugees had entered Britain. 1,200 of them under the "Homes for Ukraine" scheme for those who are sponsored by UK hosts and 10,800 under the Ukrainian family scheme for those with prior family connections to the UK. The British government had received 79,800 applications for visas from Ukrainians and had issued 40,900 up to 7 April 2022, but only 21,600 refugees had actually entered the UK by 22 April and 27,100 by 22 April under both schemes. By 29 May 2022, this figure had reached 65,700.

A report by the British Red Cross found that the cost-of-living crisis of the early 2020s had affected host families' ability to support Ukrainian refugees by the latter half of 2022.

A study by the University of York also found that, though children of Ukrainian refugees had been successful in learning English, after 12 to 18 months younger children had begun to struggle with simple tasks in Ukrainian, raising questions over future bonds to their extended families.

=== Other countries ===
==== Argentina ====
In May 2022, the first private plane carrying refugees arriving under humanitarian visas arrived in Buenos Aires carrying 9 passengers. The Argentine government has stated its intent to continue such flights.

==== Australia ====
In the wake of the Russian invasion in February, Prime Minister Scott Morrison said that visa applications from Ukrainian nationals would be sent "to the top of the pile". Several Australians have opened their homes to host Ukrainian refugees, with more than 4,000 visas having been processed. On 20 March, the federal government announced that Ukrainians who arrive or are already in the country will be allowed temporary humanitarian visas, which allows them to work, study, and access healthcare. By 20 March, about 5,000 Ukrainians had been granted visas to travel to Australia, and 750 have arrived.

==== Brazil ====
On 3 March, Brazil announced that Ukrainians would receive humanitarian visas as refugees, with a period of 5 months to apply for asylum. The country has around 600,000 people of Ukrainian descent, about 38,000 of whom live in Prudentópolis, according to the Ukrainian-Brazilian Central Representation. From 3 February until 19 March, Brazil had received almost 900 Ukrainian refugees according to Brazilian police. On 22 March, the country's police reported that 1,100 Ukrainians had landed in Brazil up to that date.

==== Canada ====
On 3 March 2022, the Government of Canada announced a plan to permanently reunify Canadian citizens with their Ukrainian family members. Immigration, Refugees and Citizenship Canada stated the country will allow an unlimited number of Ukrainians to apply to temporarily stay in Canada and provide work permits for Ukrainians that have either been accepted under these migration schemes or cannot safely return to Ukraine. On 17 March 2022, the Government launched the Canada-Ukraine Authorization for Emergency Travel (CUAET), which gives Ukrainians and their families a visa to come to Canada temporarily, and allows them to work and study there for up to three years. There is no limit to the number of people who can apply, and applicants who are overseas can apply online and provide their biometrics (fingerprints and a photo). The online application takes 14 days to process. Ukrainians approved under the CUAET will be able to travel to Canada up until 31 March 2024. Afterward, they will be subject to the standard immigration measures available to others around the world.

Canada is home to nearly 1.4 million Ukrainian-Canadians, making Canada the second-largest population of the Ukrainian diaspora, after Russia. Between 17 March and 8 July 2022, 1,084,599 applications through CUAET were received, of which 784,272 were approved, with 164,626 having arrived in Canada under said program. In March 2022 Canada announced it was investing an additional CA$117 million in the implementation of new immigration programs for Ukrainian refugees.

People coming to Canada from Ukraine under the CUAET scheme were legally considered to be temporary residents rather than refugees. They were granted the right to work or study in Canada for three years but do not get the right to automatic permanent residency like refugees from Syria or Afghanistan. This policy was reportedly adopted to simplify and speed up the application process. In 2024, Canada admitted only 6,780 new permanent residents from Ukraine.

==== Egypt ====
When the conflict broke out, there were an estimated 16,000 to 20,000 Ukrainian tourists, now refugees, in Egypt. The Egyptian government assisted them to leave Egypt, with free flights to Poland, Slovakia, and Hungary – as of 4 March, almost 4,000 had left the country.

==== Israel ====
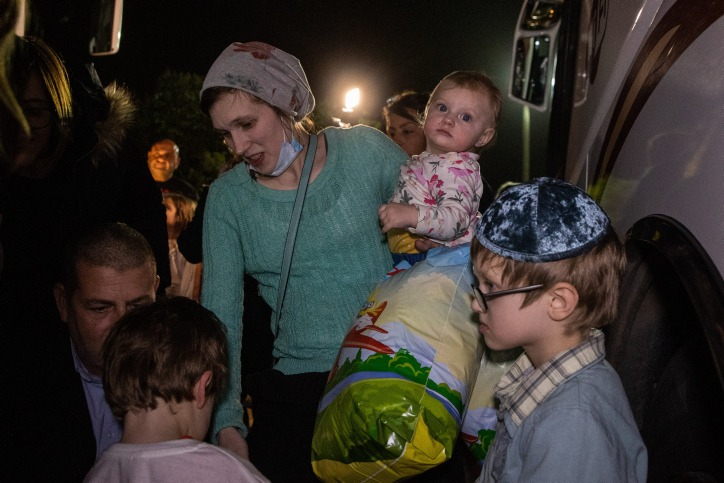
A Ukrainian family arrives in Israel on 6 March 2022

As of 22 May, 36,600 Ukrainians had arrived in Israel, of whom 18,600 had the right to enter Israel.

As of 23 March, more than 15,200 Ukrainian refugees had arrived in Israel, of whom only 4,200 would have otherwise been eligible for citizenship In addition, another 20,000 Ukrainians who were already inside Israel when the conflict broke out (on tourist visas or illegally in the country) were also regarded as refugees and given permission to stay. On 3 July 2022, the Supreme Court of Israel abolished the quotas on Ukrainian refugees in Israel and allowed unlimited entry of refugees into Israel. Ukrainian president Volodymyr Zelenskyy welcomed the decision and said it is a sign of "a true, developed democracy"

As of January 2023, 15,000 Ukrainian refugees remained in Israel, of the about 47,000 Ukrainians who had traveled to Israel since the start of the invasion but who are not entitled to citizenship under Israel's Law of Return. None of the 15,000 had been granted refugee status by Israel.

==== Japan ====
Japan opened its borders to refugees from Ukraine fleeing the war on 15 March 2022. On 12 March, Chief Cabinet Secretary, Hirokazu Matsuno confirmed that 29 Ukrainians had entered Japan to seek shelter with friends or relatives in Hiroshima.

As of 6 April 2022, 437 Ukrainian refugees had entered Japan, reaching 1222 by 8 June 2022. The largest number of Ukrainian refugees were in Tokyo (215 people), Fukuoka (92 people) and Kanagawa (70 people), 284 being under the age of 18 according to the prefectures.

In 30 November 2022 the number of refugees reached 2158, the highest number being in Tokyo (545 people), Osaka (154 people), Kanagawa (139 people), Fukuoka (122 people) and Hyōgo (105 people), 417 were under the age of 18, 1463 between the ages of 18 and 61 and 278 over 61.

==== Mexico ====
Mexico has been the Latin American country that has received the most Ukrainians since February 2022.

==== New Zealand ====
New Zealand promised to accept 4,000 Ukrainian refugees. By July 2022, 227 Ukrainians had arrived in New Zealand.

==== Philippines ====
The Philippines' Department of Justice stated that the country would be willing to accept Ukrainian refugees and asylum seekers as a response to the Russian invasion of Ukraine. President Rodrigo Duterte on 28 February 2022 institutionalized the Philippines policy to protect refugees, stateless persons and asylum seekers under international law.

==== Sri Lanka ====
Early in the conflict the government announced that it would grant and extend free visas by two months for over 15,000 Russians and Ukrainians who are stranded in Sri Lanka due to the ongoing conflict.

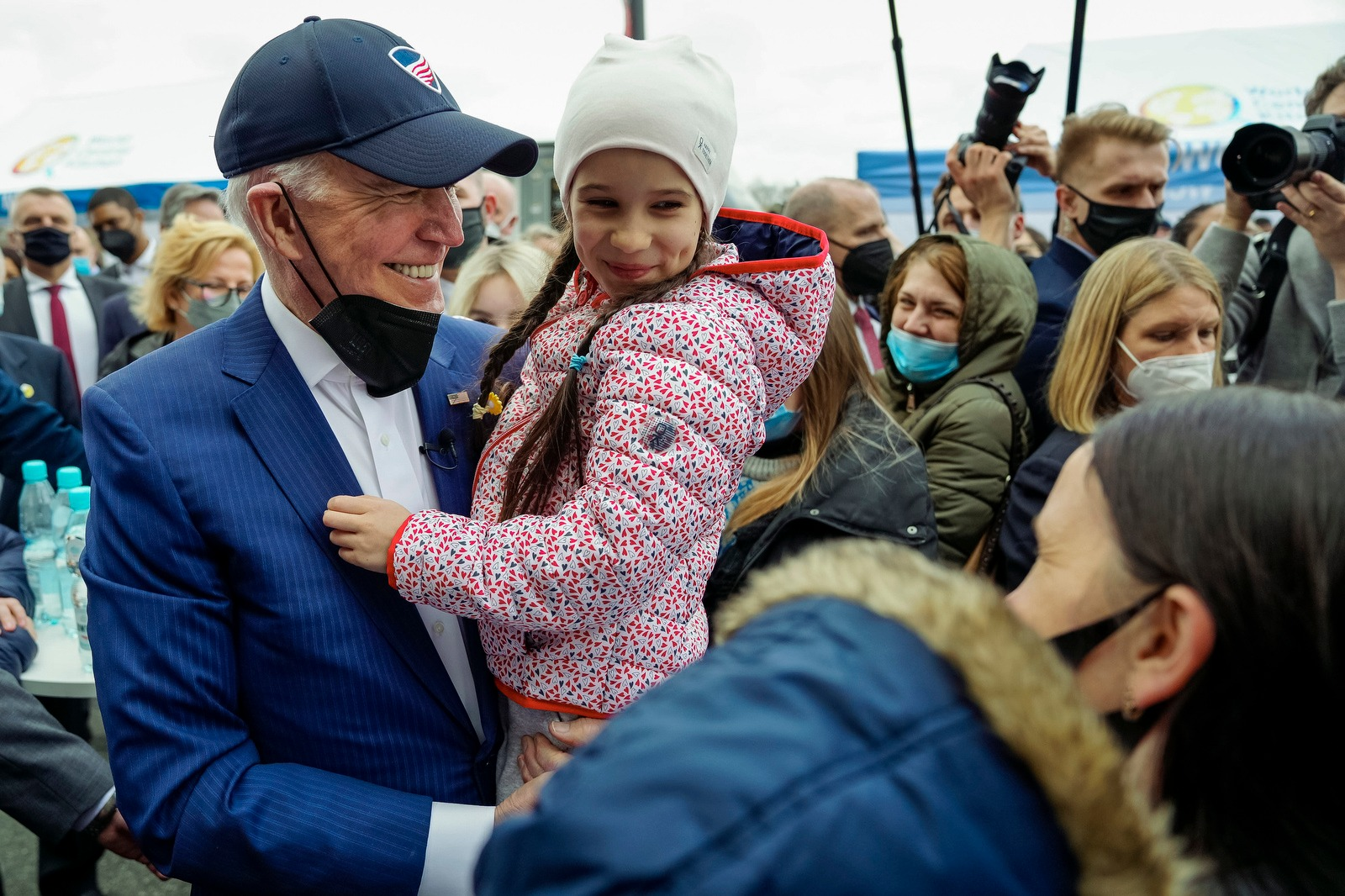
American president Joe Biden meeting with a group of Ukrainian refugees in Warsaw, Poland, in March 2022

==== Turkey (Note: Including European Turkey) ====
On 3 March 2022, Turkey announced that 20,000 Ukrainian refugees had entered Turkey since the Russian invasion. Interior Minister Süleyman Soylu said that Turkey was glad to welcome them. By 8 March 2022, official figures put the number of Ukrainian refugees in the country at 20,550, of whom 551 were of Crimean Tatar or Meskhetian Turk origin. The Ukrainian winner of the 2016 Eurovision Song Contest, Jamala, who is of Crimean Tatar origin, also sought refuge in Turkey. By 23 March 2022, the number of Ukrainian refugees had risen above 58,000. As of 25 April 2022, the number of Ukrainian refugees in Turkey exceeded 85,000.

==== United States ====
The United States announced on 4 March 2022, that Ukrainians would be provided Temporary Protected Status. This was estimated to impact 30,000 Ukrainian nationals in the United States. On 24 March 2022, US President Biden announced that up to 100,000 Ukrainian refugees would be accepted into the United States; especially, focusing on those with family already in the country. As of June 2022, only 300 Ukrainians had been resettled under the U.S. Refugee Admissions Program, and most Ukrainian refugees came to the United States on visas they held or by crossing the Mexico–United States border. By late 2022 approximately 85,000 Ukrainians had utilized the "Uniting for Ukraine" program which allows refugees with an American sponsor to remain in America for two years. On 21 December 2022, President Joe Biden announced during his meeting with Volodymyr Zelenskyy that the U.S. had accepted roughly 221,000 Ukrainian refugees via earlier Title 42 encounters, Uniting for Ukraine and other organisations. On 18 August 2023, the Biden administration announced it would extend Temporary Protected Status from 19 October 2023, to 19 April 2025. In January 2025, President Biden's administration extended Temporary Protected Status for Ukrainians until October 2026. However, this temporary protection is only available to Ukrainians who had arrived in the US by August 2023.

On 20 January 2025, newly inaugurated President Donald Trump signed the Executive Order Securing Our Borders. Due to this order The Uniting for Ukraine parole program is paused, and is not accepting new applications.

The killing of Iryna Zarutska, a Ukrainian refugee from Kyiv, on a light rail train in Charlotte, North Carolina, gained national attention, prompting statements and legislative oversight from local, state, and federal politicians. Addressing the United Nations General Assembly on 24 September 2025, Ukrainian President Volodymyr Zelenskyy paid tribute to Zarutska.

==== Uruguay ====
On 10 March 2022, President Luis Lacalle Pou stated that Uruguay was willing to accept Ukrainian refugees, despite the issue not yet being discussed with any international organization, and noting that the country "has historically had open arms in this regard". In the first half of 2022, ten Ukrainians arrived in Uruguay as refugees.

== International aid ==
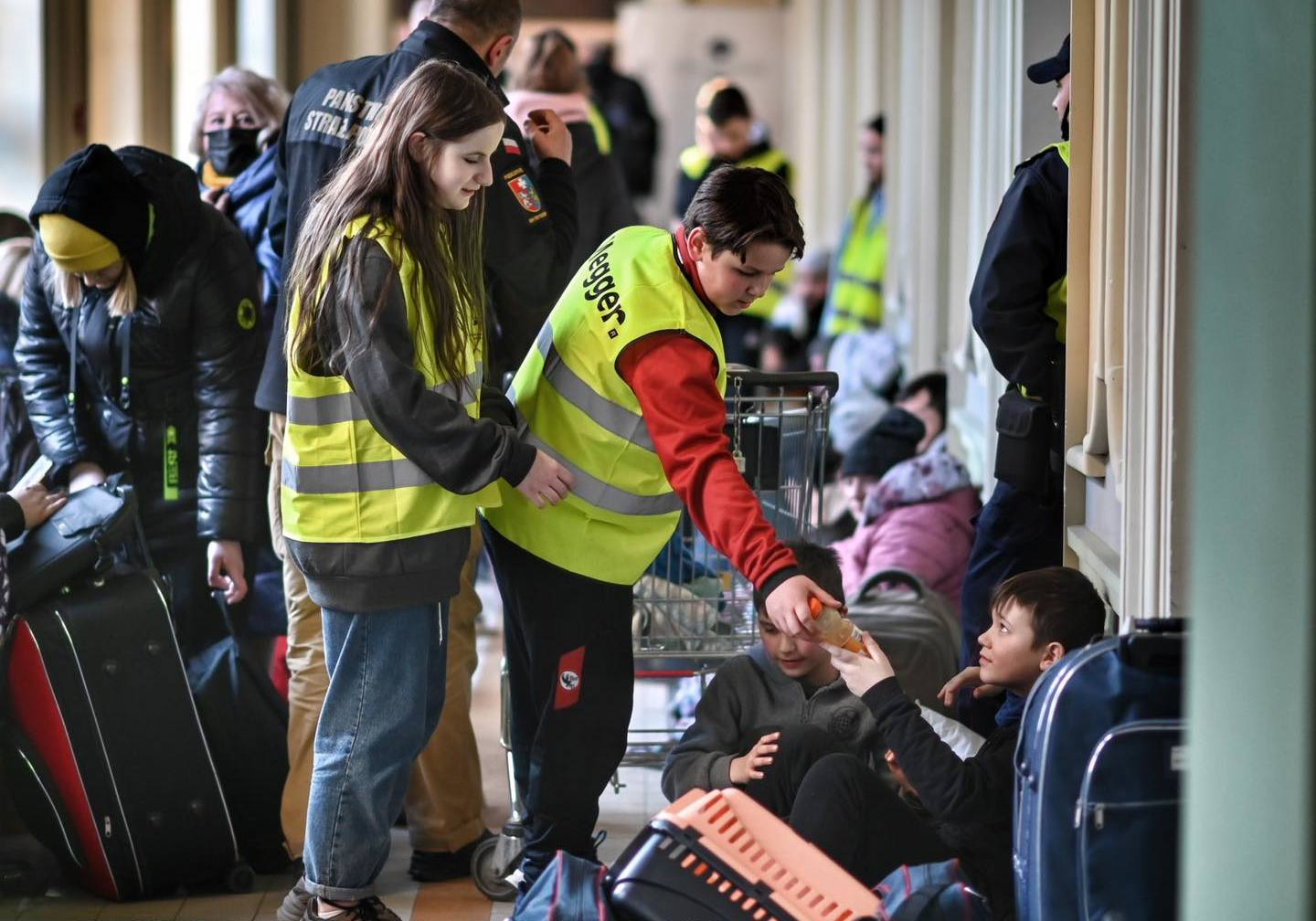
Volunteers assist refugees in a Polish train station

Organizations such as UNICEF, the United Nations Refugee Agency, International Rescue Committee and others began accepting monetary donations to help refugees and those affected by the crisis. Others such as The Kyiv Independent began GoFundMe campaigns to raise money for specific causes or calls for physical items to be donated.

On 10 May 2022, the US House of Representatives passed legislation that would provide $900 million for housing, education and other help for Ukrainian refugees in the United States.

UNICEF is helping the Ukrainian children and refugees also by providing essential health services, safe drinking water supplies, education and protection.

== Controversy and concerns ==
=== Human trafficking concerns ===
The Council of Europe's Group of Experts on Action against Trafficking in Human Beings (GRETA) and aid organizations such as the Human Trafficking Foundation and World Vision warned that refugees are at risk of falling into human trafficking, exploitation and violence, including sexual violence.

Concerns about human trafficking and sexual violence have been realized during the refugee crisis, with spotty documentation and identification, language barriers and the large numbers of refugees creating opportunities for traffickers. A Ukrainian refugee who stayed to help at a border location told reporters of calling the police on three men holding transportation signs, who were later arrested for looking for women for the sex trade. Another refugee spoke of men who attempted to coerce her and her children into a van full of only women, and refused to show her proof of identification and attempted to intimidate her from other travel options. At least one man was arrested on suspicions of raping a 19-year-old refugee after promising her work and shelter.

La Strada worked on a case where Ukrainian girls were offered tickets to Mexico, Turkey and the United Arab Emirates without ever meeting the men who invited them. European Commissioner for Home Affairs Ylva Johansson said: "We have some indications on online services that the demand for Ukrainian women for sexual purposes has gone up." According to USA Today, "there has been a skyrocketing increase in all forms of illegal trafficking of women and girls in the region – and also boys – including forced sex and labor, prostitution, pornography and other forms of sexual exploitation... In recent weeks, online searches for Ukrainian women and keywords like escorts, porn or sex have shot up dramatically in European countries, according to the Organization for Security and Co-operation in Europe (OSCE)."

Polish, Romanian and Slovak law enforcement deployed patrols to border crossings to look out for criminal activity. Both men and women have attempted to procure female refugees at stations. The Polish government passed an amendment which raised the minimum sentence of human trafficking from 3 years to 10 years, and the sex trafficking of children from 10 years to 25 years. In Berlin, German authorities advised refugees not to accept help directly from people at train stations, and for Germans to register their offers of help on coordinated websites rather than approaching refugees directly. German police also increased the number of uniformed and undercover police officers at train stations, and asked volunteers to report suspicious activity at train stations.

==== Unaccompanied minors ====
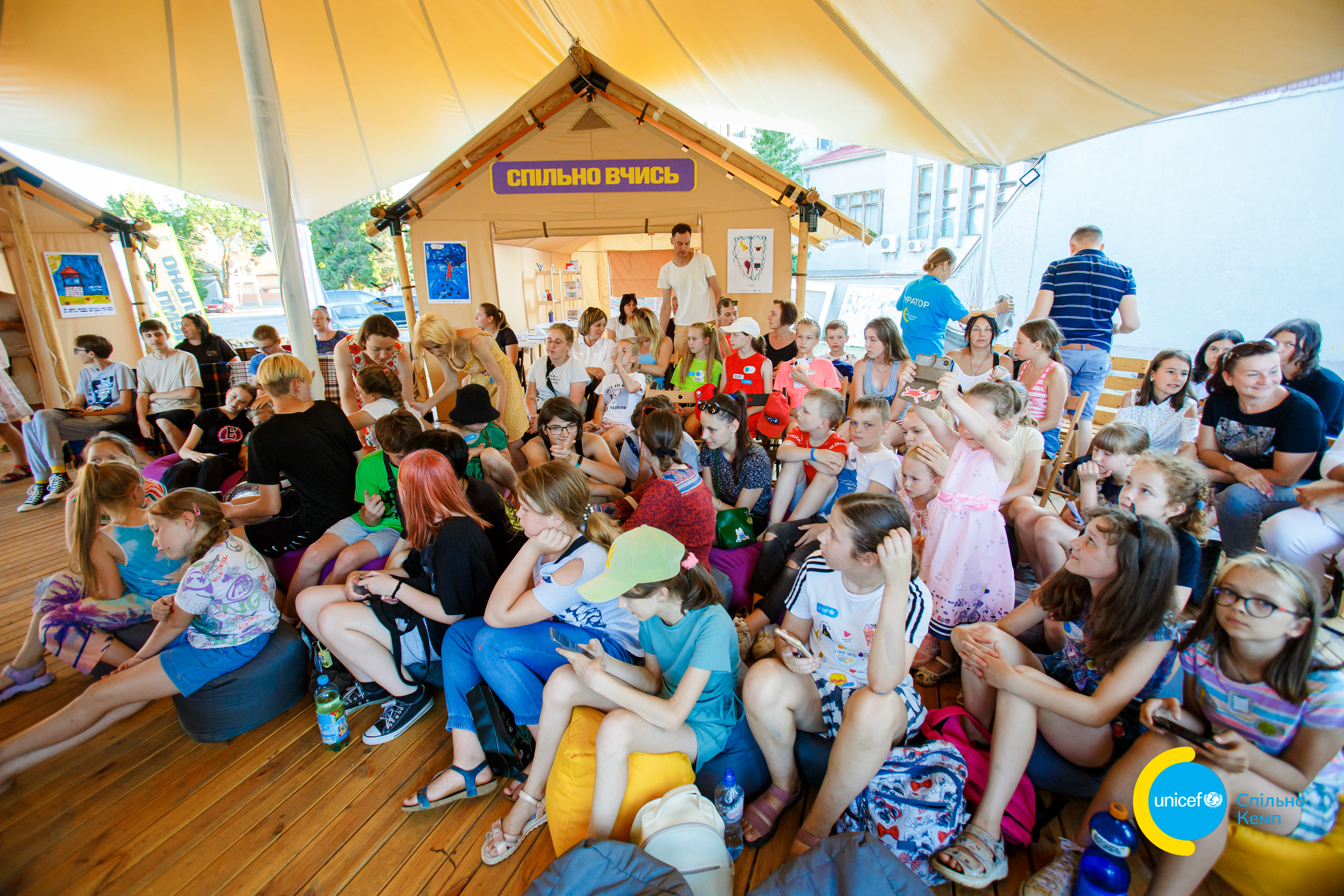
Internally displaced children from other parts of Ukraine in the Zakarpattia Oblast of western Ukraine

UNICEF and UNHCR raised concerns about minors who were traveling unaccompanied, and urged neighbouring countries to identify and register the children before sending them to relocation services. They also highlighted a number of institutional care and boarding schools in Ukraine which held about 10,000 students that have been caught up in the invasion. In some countries, accommodation has been created specifically for orphaned children in foster homes or orphanages. UNICEF set up "Blue Dot" safe spaces in neighboring countries, which included support for unaccompanied children. In addition, some protection for separated and unaccompanied minors is now provided through a system of temporary guardianship in the country where the children arrive, which Poland among other countries has set up under new legislation.

=== Deportations ===
According to Ukrainian authorities, thousands of refugees arriving in Russia have been forcibly relocated using 'filtration centres', evoking the memory of Soviet era population transfers and prior Russian use of such centres in the Chechen War of Independence. Forcible deportation by a warring party is a human rights violation, and experts warn that the forcible transfer of Ukrainian children for "adoption" in Russia is a genocidal act.

RIA Novosti and Ukrainian officials stated that thousands were dispatched to filtration centres in Penza Oblast, Taganrog, Donetsk, Ryazan, Yaroslavl and the Russian-occupied Ukrainian cities of Dokuchaievsk, Izium and Bezimenne. The Ukrainian government claimed that 400,000 Ukrainian citizens have been forcibly taken to Russia where "some could be sent as far as the Pacific Ocean island of Sakhalin and are being offered jobs on condition they don't leave for two years", while "the Kremlin" claimed the relocated people wanted to go to Russia. It was reported that underground networks of Russians and Russian exiles, had been helping Ukrainian refugees to leave Russia and Russian controlled areas. More than 20,000 Ukrainians have entered Estonia from Russia since the war began.

Human Rights Watch, the UN Human Rights Office, Amnesty International, the United States Department of State, and The Intercept have reported Russian deportations of Ukrainians. According to the U.S. State Department, the number of Ukrainians who have been deported or forcibly transferred into Russia is between 900,000 and 1.6 million, citing various sources including the Russian government.

=== Military-age men and travel restrictions ===
Following the February 2022 Russian invasion, Ukrainian men between the ages of 18 and 60 were initially barred from leaving the country, a restriction that was later narrowed to ages 23 to 60, though an estimated 600,000 to 850,000 Ukrainian men still fled to Europe. To address this, the Ukrainian government in April 2024 suspended the issuance of new passports and the provision of non-emergency consular services for military-age Ukrainian men residing abroad. Among those who fled illegally, Romanian border police reported that more than 30,000 Ukrainian men crossed into Romania alone, often undertaking hazardous transits through the Carpathian Mountains and across the Tisza River that have resulted in numerous rescues and fatalities.

Throughout 2024, the Polish government and Lithuanian leaders, including President Gitanas Nausėda, Prime Minister Ingrida Šimonytė, and Defence Minister Laurynas Kasčiūnas, repeatedly expressed readiness to assist in the repatriation of military-age Ukrainian men to support Kyiv's conscription efforts. At the time, more than 650,000 military-age Ukrainian men were registered as refugees across the European Union, Norway, Switzerland, and Liechtenstein, with estimates suggesting that up to 400,000 resided in Poland alone.

In June 2026, European Commission President Ursula von der Leyen signaled plans to alter the terms of the Temporary Protection Directive, an EU emergency mechanism that grants immediate collective protection to displaced persons, in response to the ongoing Ukrainian conscription crisis. Consequently, EU member states began debating the exclusion of new arrivals of Ukrainian men aged 23 to 60 who are subject to the 2022 Ukrainian mobilization, aiming to avoid undermining Ukraine's self-defense capacity. The proposal reflected a position also expressed by German Chancellor Friedrich Merz, who stated during a bilateral meeting with Ukrainian President Zelenskyy that Berlin would actively support Kyiv's efforts to limit the exodus of military-age men and facilitate their return, emphasizing their importance for Ukraine's defense and future reconstruction. Furthermore, representatives from Poland, Finland, Sweden, and Austria also voiced support for the proposal during EU ministerial meetings, arguing that restricting automatic residency rights for individuals subject to mobilization is necessary to help maintain Ukraine's military mobilization capacity and support its war effort.

Following these discussions, on 26 June 2026, the European Commission formally proposed extending the temporary protection framework for displaced Ukrainians until March 2028. At the request of Kyiv, the proposal introduced restrictions excluding newly arriving Ukrainian men of military age from receiving automatic temporary protection status. In July 2026, the Council of the European Union made compliance with military obligations in Ukraine a condition for newly granted temporary protection to displaced Ukrainians. The new rule took effect on 5 August.

=== Hostility towards refugees ===
According to a 2023 survey, 57% of Ukrainian refugees in the Czech Republic experienced verbal— aggression because of their nationality, and 5% said they had been physically attacked. The Czech Republic hosted more Ukrainian refugees per capita than any other country in the world. Hostility towards Ukrainian refugees was widespread among poorer and less educated Czechs, and among the Romani minority as Institutional flaws that have pitted two of Europe's most vulnerable against each other. Japanese-born Czech far-right politician Tomio Okamura claimed that the "widespread aid to Ukrainians" by the Czech government "is disproportionate to the aid to our socially vulnerable citizens".

There was also growing hostility towards Ukrainian refugees in Poland.

=== Racial discrimination ===
==== Treatment at the borders ====
A few days into the crisis, claims of discrimination by border guards and other authorities against non-European and Romani people were reported by some of those fleeing Ukraine. There were reports of people being forced to move to the backs of queues, deboarded from buses, prevented from crossing the border, and, in one report, being beaten by guards. Some Indians in Ukraine said they were targeted after India chose to abstain from condemning Russia at the UN. Some Indians and Africans were reportedly harassed and threatened by Polish nationalists after crossing into Poland. On 1 March, Filippo Grandi, of UNHCR, acknowledged that discrimination against non-Ukrainians had occurred at some borders, but he did not believe it was from state policies.

The African Union called attempts to prevent Africans from crossing the border racist and not in line with international law. On 2 March, Ukrainian foreign minister Dmytro Kuleba stated that Africans "need to have equal opportunity" to leave the country and he also stated that "Ukraine's government spares no effort to solve the problem." On 3 March, Russian president Vladimir Putin held talks with Indian prime minister Narendra Modi and told him that he had instructed Russian soldiers to "ensure the safe exit of Indian nationals from the armed conflict zone."

In 2020, Ukraine had over 76,000 foreign students, with India and African countries each making up one quarter of the total number. With their affordable tuition, straightforward visa requirements, and the possibility of permanent residency, Ukrainian universities were seen as an entry point to the European job market. Afghans constitute the largest immigrant group in the country, having arrived as early as the 1980s. Andriy Demchenko, a spokesperson for the Ukrainian border guard, said that allegations of segregation at the borders are untrue. On 28 February, Krzysztof Szczerski, Poland's ambassador to the UN, reported that the refugees who were admitted from Ukraine on that day alone represented 125 countries. Since then, EU Commissioner Ylva Johansson has stated that its borders are open to people in Ukraine from third countries who want to travel to their home countries, and individuals in need of protection can apply for asylum.

On 2 March, the German embassy as well as the EU delegation in Kenya called for verification of the postings on Kenyan social media, cautioning that unsubstantiated claims had been spread. According to the German news program Tagesschau, such allegations are grave because they are in line with the narrative of Vladimir Putin, who has justified his attack on Ukraine with, the need to free the country from "Nazis". On Polish social media, the amount of both pro-Russian and racist content saw an increase following the invasion, and fake news about supposed crimes which were committed by, or against refugees were partially spread by pro-Kremlin accounts.

==== By politicians and mainstream media ====
Differences between the policies, border treatment and media portrayal of Ukrainian refugees compared to other groups, in particular those during the 2015 European migrant crisis, have been criticised. Specific issues include alleged harsher treatment and more restrictions placed on Syrian, Afghan, Iraqi, and other refugees, in contrast to the relatively liberal and welcoming response to native Ukrainian refugees. Portrayal by some Western media and politicians of Ukraine as a country "where you wouldn't expect that" [war] and its people as "white", "Christian", "relatively civilized", "relatively European", "like us", and having "blue eyes and blonde hair" has also been criticised. Guardian columnist Kenan Malik wrote that there is an irony in such Western reporting, as there was a "long history of bigotry towards Slavs", seeing them as "primitive" and “Asiatic” and "a born slave"

Professor of philosophy Serena Parekh suggested that besides racism there are other factors explaining the different treatment in earlier crises: including that current Ukrainian refugees are almost entirely women, children and elderly people. Under the purview of the visa liberalisation agreement in force since 2017, Ukrainians with biometric passports were already allowed to enter the Schengen zone and stay for up to 90 days within any 180 days period without a visa; therefore, there was never any question of whether they should be allowed to enter any Schengen zone country. The welcoming approach witnessed in Central and Eastern Europe has been further explained by its geographical and language proximity to Ukraine, large Ukrainian diasporas, shared history and traumatizing experiences of Soviet aggression and occupation.

Romani people have suffered since they often lack the civil status documentation needed to access humanitarian assistance. Some local officials have allegedly refused to accommodate Romani refugees from Ukraine in their territories.

== Pets and zoo animals ==
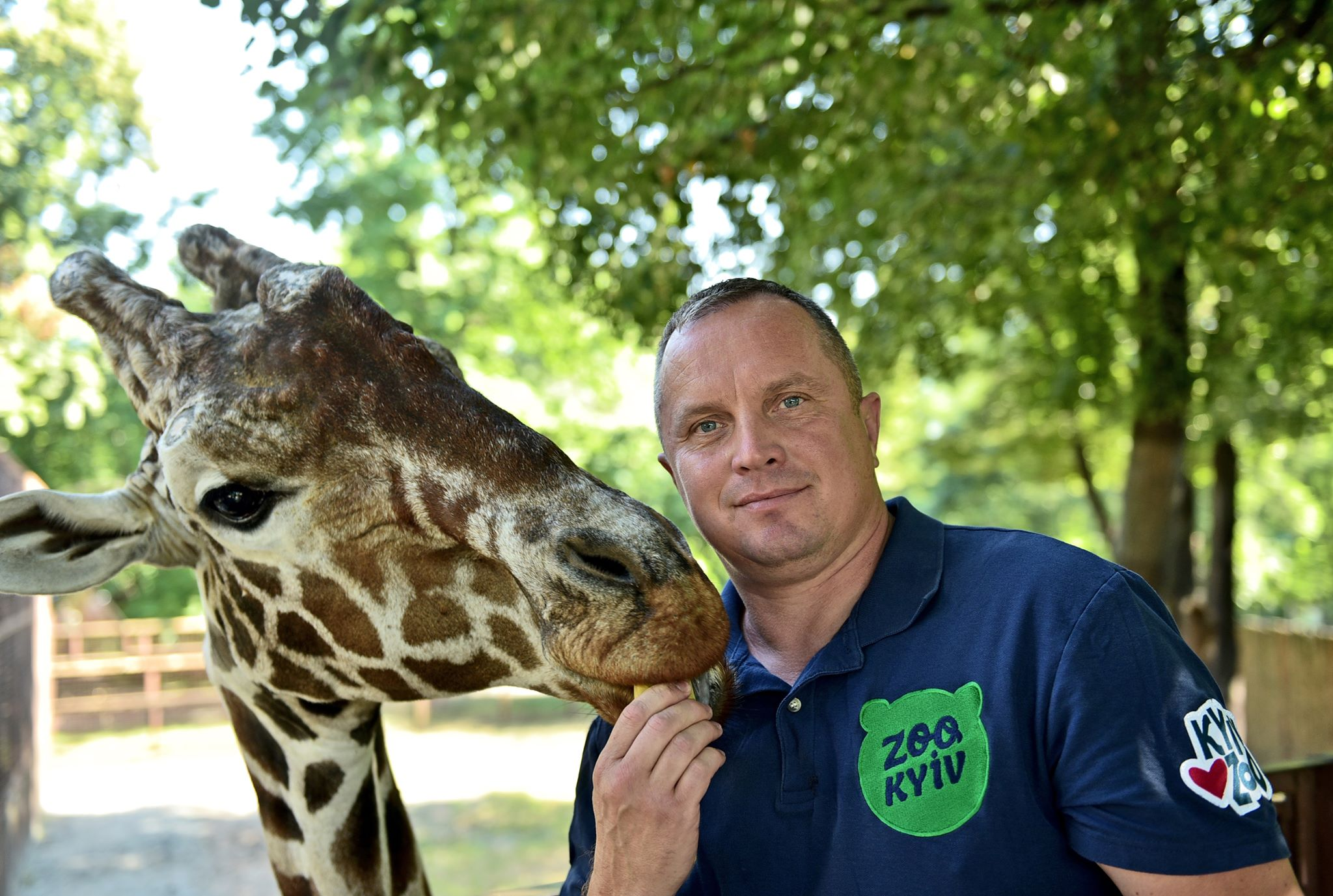
Kyiv Zoo in 2020

Domestic animals and animals in zoos were caught up in the invasion, with many border crossing regulations of microchipping and vaccinations in effect. Pets entering the EU from a third country would normally have to include an identification document or pet passport that includes information on anti-rabies vaccinations and any other preventative health measures. Additionally, dogs, cats and ferrets must undergo a rabies antibody titration test. Many EU authorities and governments of neighboring countries have since removed or relaxed the requirements needed for pets to cross the borders with their owners.

While some delayed leaving Ukraine in order to leave with their pets, others were forced to give their pets to shelters or leave them with relatives who were staying behind. Some international organizations, such as the International Fund for Animal Welfare and PETA and independent organizations or sanctuaries, have offered support in the form of food, veterinary supplies for the animals and wages along with housing for the caretakers. Others who work with animal shelters or the Kyiv Zoo have refused to evacuate, when it would be impossible to safely evacuate all the animals due to their numbers or size. The Feldman Ecopark Zoo (outside Kharkiv) reported the death and wounding of some of their animals due to damage to their facilities. A lion and a wolf were evacuated from a zoo in Zaporizhzhia, Ukraine to a zoo in Rădăuți, Romania.

== See also ==
- Borders of Ukraine – International boundary of Ukraine
- Demographics of Ukraine
- Emigration from Europe
- European migrant crisis
- List of largest refugee crises
- Migration diplomacy
- Refugees in Poland
- Refugees in Romania
- Prelude to the Russian invasion of Ukraine
- Russian emigration following the 2022 invasion of Ukraine
- Evacuations during the 2023 Israel–Hamas war
