= Temporary Protection Directive =

European Union directive on displaced people

Directive 2001/55/EC
- European Union directive
- Title: Council Directive on minimum standards for giving temporary protection in the event of a mass influx of displaced persons and on measures promoting a balance of efforts between Member States in receiving such persons and bearing the consequences thereof
- Made by: Council
- Made under: Art. 63(2) TEC
- Journal reference: L 212, 7.8.2001, p. 12–23

History
- Date made: 20 July 2001
- Entry into force: 7 August 2001

Other legislation
- Amends: —
- Replaced by: —

The Temporary Protection Directive (TPD; Council Directive 2001/55/EC) is a 2001 European Union directive providing for immediate, temporary protection for displaced people from outside the external border of the Union, intended to be used in exceptional circumstances when the regular EU asylum system has trouble handling a "mass influx" of refugees. It was introduced in the aftermath of the Yugoslav Wars, but was not used before 2022. When invoked, it requires EU member states to accept refugees as allocated based on their capacity to host them, following a principle of solidarity and a "balance of efforts" among member states.

On 3 March 2022, in response to the refugee crisis caused by the 2022 Russian invasion of Ukraine, EU ministers unanimously agreed to invoke the Temporary Protection Directive for the first time in its history.

== Origins ==
With the entry into force of the Treaty of Amsterdam on 1 May 1999, the European Union gained authority to legislate in the areas of migration and asylum policy. At the European Council meeting held in Tampere in October 1999, several legislative instruments instituting a Common European Asylum System (CEAS) were proposed. Together with the other instruments, the Temporary Protection Directive was passed in 2001 in the aftermath of the Yugoslav Wars. The directive has been in effect since 7 August 2001, but was not invoked until 2022.

== Details ==
The Temporary Protection Directive aims to harmonise European Union policies with respect to displaced people and increase solidarity and collaboration between member states in a refugee crisis. The directive discusses procedures for triggering and ending temporary protection, rights of people under temporary protection, and special provisions for specific categories of people (survivors of trauma, unaccompanied minors, and potential security threats).

Temporary protection, which is distinct from asylum, can last up to three years depending on circumstances. People under temporary protection can obtain a residence permit without the complicated bureaucracy normally associated with seeking asylum. They are allowed to work and access social welfare, and are entitled to protection throughout the EU. Children must be allowed to access education the same way as EU residents.

To invoke the directive, the European Commission must first make a proposal to member states, and a qualified majority of the Council of the European Union (generally at least 55% of EU countries, representing at least 65% of the union's total population) needs to vote in favour. The directive is intended to be invoked in the event of a "mass influx" of refugees; the definition of "mass influx" was intentionally left vague and is meant to be defined on a case-by-case basis, in order to allow flexibility in its application.

When invoked, the directive compels all member states (except Denmark, which has an opt-out clause) to accept refugees, issue residence permits, minimise red tape, and take other steps to assist displaced people. Refugees are to be distributed among member states on a voluntary basis, based on member states' capacity to host them.

The directive originally did not apply to Ireland due to its opt-out clause, but on 11 April 2003, the Irish government stated its desire to opt in, which was accepted by the European Commission. However, as of 2016 the Irish government has not transposed the directive.

== Ukrainian refugee crisis ==
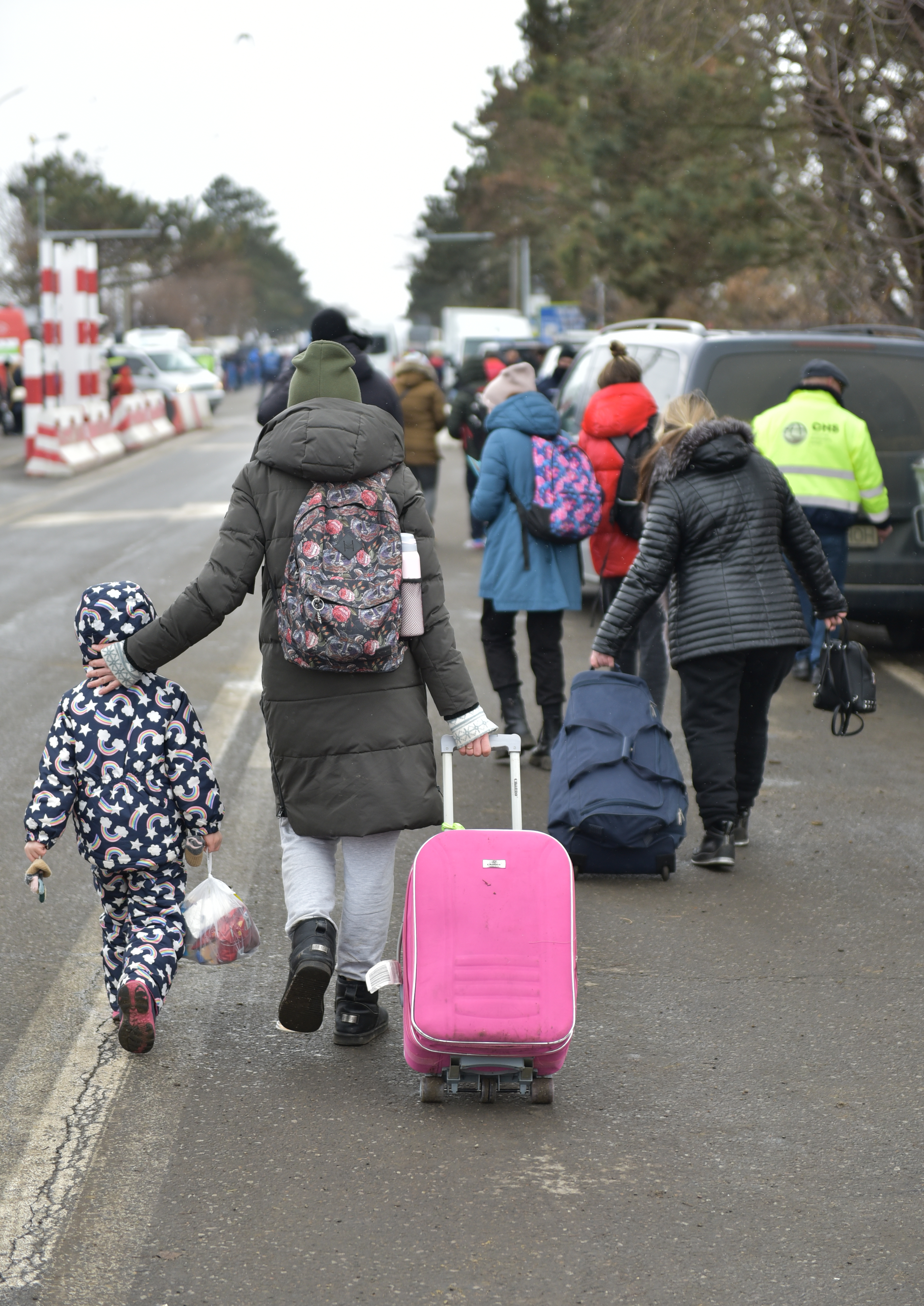
Refugees entering Romania, 5 March 2022

In March 2022, the Council of the European Union invoked the Temporary Protection Directive for the first time in its history, in response to the refugee crisis caused by the Russian invasion of Ukraine. The European Commission proposed invoking the directive on 2 March 2022, and EU ministers unanimously agreed to invoke it on 3 March. The decision was unanimous despite the fact that Hungarian minister Gergely Gulyás had expressed opposition hours before the decision. The Council formally activated the directive on 4 March 2022.

The European Commission published guidelines for how member states should implement the directive in light of the crisis, and individual member states have announced specific requirements for how refugees can apply for protected status. It was reported that the directive would include "non-Ukrainian nationals and stateless people legally residing in Ukraine", if they are unable to return to their home countries. Although Denmark is not bound by the TPD, Danish authorities have announced a similar "Special Act Status" for Ukrainian refugees.

The legal blog Lawfare said it was surprising that the Council's decision was unanimous, pointing out that Hungary and Poland had opposed burden-sharing measures during the 2015 refugee crisis. Lawfare said that those countries' support for invoking the TPD in 2022 was probably driven by "popular sympathy for the Ukrainians, and the specter of further Russian westward expansion".

In 2026, EU ministers considered excluding Ukrainian men who could be drafted from the directive. At a meeting of the Justice and Home Affairs Council, Swedish migration minister Johan Forssell said there was "strong support" for the change among the ministers present. This debate was preceded by statements from German Chancellor Friedrich Merz, who indicated during an April 2026 meeting with Ukrainian President Volodymyr Zelenskyy that Berlin would actively support Kyiv's efforts to limit the exodus of military-age men and facilitate their return for defense and reconstruction. In June 2026, European Commission President Ursula von der Leyen also signaled formal plans to alter the terms of the directive in response to the ongoing Ukrainian conscription crisis.

Following these discussions, on 26 June 2026, the European Commission formally proposed extending temporary protection until March 2028 while excluding newly arriving Ukrainian men aged 23 to 60 subject to mobilization, a move requested by Kyiv to support its defense needs. While presenting the extension, EU Migration Commissioner Magnus Brunner emphasized the coordination with Ukrainian authorities, stating, "This is what Ukraine has asked us to do, and this is what we are doing." On the other hand, the Council of Europe Commissioner for Human Rights Michael O’Flaherty opposed the proposal, criticized the exclusion of entire groups such as conscription age men and pointed to the possible violation of the right for non-discrimination (Article 14 European Convention on Human Rights and Article 1 Protocol No. 12 of the same Convention).

On 30 July 2026, the Council of the European Union adopted new rules linking the granting of temporary protection to compliance with military obligations under Ukrainian law.

== Other proposals for use or repeal ==
The directive's possible use has occasionally been discussed in the years since it was passed.

In 2011, the EU received more than 300,000 refugees, partly due to the First Libyan Civil War. The Italian and Maltese governments argued for using the Temporary Protection Directive, and the European Commission discussed invoking it to address tension between Italy and France over their differing refugee policies. However, the directive was not invoked, partly due to opposition from the German government.

Amid the 2015 European refugee crisis, the UNHCR, some members of the European Parliament, and activists called for the directive to be invoked.

EU foreign policy official Josep Borrell discussed the possibility of invoking the directive in 2021 to aid Afghan refugees following the United States military's withdrawal from Afghanistan.

There has been discussion of the directive in the context of climate refugees, but it is thought that it would probably not be applicable due to the gradual nature of climate change.

=== Possibility of repeal ===
In 2020, a proposed regulation stated that the Temporary Protection Directive "no longer responds to member states’ current reality" and should be repealed.

John Koo, a lecturer in EU law at London South Bank University, has argued that the directive benefits neither EU member states nor refugees themselves, and that its mechanisms contain problems.

== See also ==
- Temporary protection visa – Australian counterpart
- Temporary protected status – United States counterpart
