= Afghans in Ukraine =

Afghan Ukrainians
Total population
- 1,682

Languages
- Ukrainian, Russian, Pashto, Dari

Related ethnic groups
- Pashtuns, Tajiks

Afghans in Ukraine are the country's largest diasporic community with origins outside of the former Soviet Union.

== History ==
During the existence of the Soviet Union, Afghans were the largest foreign group studying in Ukraine. After the resignation of the pro-Soviet president of Afghanistan, Mohammad Najibullah, in 1992, some Afghans in Ukraine applied for asylum. Other Afghans had returned to Afghanistan and served in the security forces during the Afghan Civil War of 1989 to 1992, with some then returning to Ukraine. Some male students married Ukrainian women. Many Afghans in Ukraine live in Kyiv and Dnipro, where some run small businesses that recruit workers from Afghanistan. There is also an Afghan community in Odesa, "made up of successive waves of exiles, refugees, and migrants" as well as commercial traders. This included former DRA General Aslam Watanjar. The 2001 Ukrainian census recorded 1,008 people of Afghan nationality.

In 2019, Ukraine was hosting 1,034 Afghan refugees. At the end of 2020, 1,449 Afghans had permanent residency in Ukraine and 233 had temporary visas.

After the withdrawal of United States and other foreign troops from Afghanistan, in September 2021 the Ukrainian military evacuated Afghans alongside Ukrainian citizens from Afghanistan, now under the control of the Taliban. This followed previous rescue missions that had followed the fall of Kabul on 15 August 2021. In the context of the 2022 Russian invasion of Ukraine, TOLOnews reported that there were around 6,000 Afghan refugee in Ukraine, many of whom lacked permission to leave the country. A number of Afghans in Ukraine have volunteered with both the Pro-Russian separatist militias and the Ukrainian army during the Russo-Ukrainian War. At the beginning of war in the Donbass, an Afghan Pashtun by the name of Rafi Jaffar joined the ranks of the Vostok battalion in 2014. Jaffar's parents, who were part of the PDPA, were killed by the Mujahedeen during the Afghan Civil War. The Soviets took him in and sent him to a Soviet boarding school in the city of Rostov. Known by his comrades as "Abdullah", In 2018, Jaffar lost both legs in a mortar attack. Despite this he continues to serve the DPR refusing to put on prosthetics. In May 2023, Russian president Vladimir Putin met with Jaffar via E conference after being told about Jaffar's health. Another Pro Russian fighter, Mohammad Omar Nasser Rahmanovich who goes by the callsign "Pashtun", who was born in Kharkiv to a Russian specialist mother and an Afghan doctor father, was featured on Russia Today on a report about drone warfare, he has participated in the conflict since its outbreak in 2014. There is one known Afghan-Ukrainian in the Ukrainian army named Jalal Noory, an ethnic Tajik who joined following the Russian invasion in 2022. Noory was killed by Russian forces in October 2023.

== Notable people ==
- Mustafa Nayyem
- Aslam Watanjar - Afghan Army general
- Vida Mohammad

== See also ==
- Afghan diaspora
- Afghan refugees
- Anti-Afghan sentiment
