= Bovenkarspel =

Town in North-Holland, Netherlands

- Town in the Netherlands
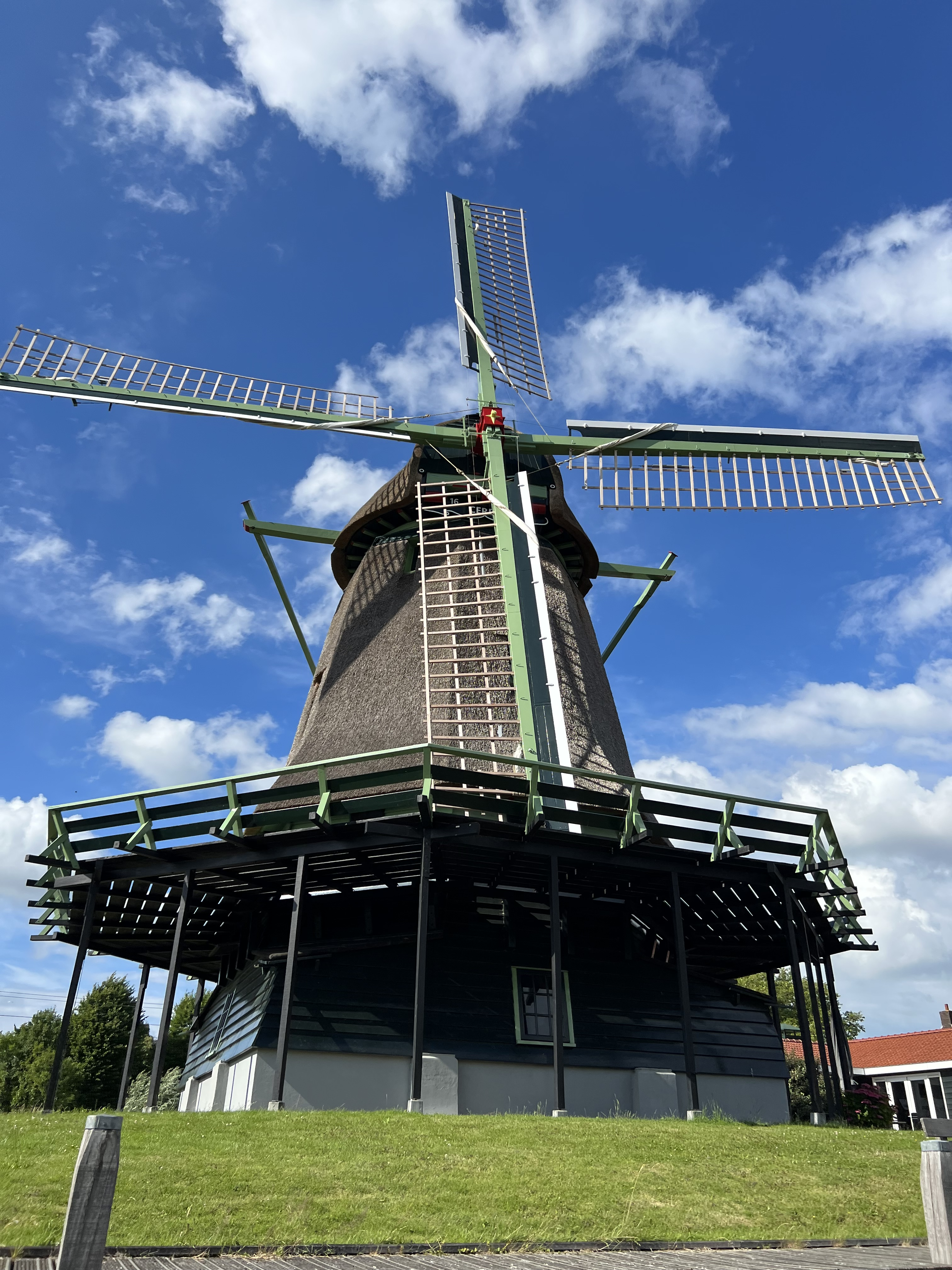
- Windmill "Ceres"

- Coat of arms

- Location in the Netherlands Location in the province of North Holland in the Netherlands
- Coordinates: 52°41′52″N 5°14′38″E
- Country: Netherlands
- Province: North Holland
- Municipality: Stede Broec
- First name reference: 1193
- Named for: Parish
- Neighbourhoods: 4

Government
  - Mayor (Stede Broec): Ronald Wortelboer (VVD)

Area
  - Total: 5.92 km^{2} (2.29 sq mi)
  - Land: 5.62 km^{2} (2.17 sq mi)
  - Water: 0.31 km^{2} (0.12 sq mi)
- Highest elevation (dyke): 4 m (13 ft)
- Lowest elevation: −2 m (−6.6 ft)

Population (2025)
  - Total: 10,125
  - Density: 1,800/km^{2} (4,670/sq mi)
- Time zone: UTC+1 (CET)
  - Summer (DST): UTC+2 (CEST)
- Postcode: 1611
- Area code: 0228

Bovenkarspel (Dutch pronunciation: [ˈboːvə(n)ˌkɑrspəl]) is a town in the municipality of Stede Broec in the Dutch province of North Holland. Situated in the West Friesland region, Bovenkarspel is known for its agricultural heritage, particularly its historical ties to horticulture and flower cultivation.

== Etymology ==
The name Bovenkarspel can be broken down into two elements that reflect its historical and geographical roots in Dutch:

- "Boven" means "upper" or "above", often used to distinguish between two settlements with the same name. However, in the case of Bovenkarspel, it refers to its location on a sand ridge, which gives it a slightly higher elevation than the surrounding area.
- "Karspel" is an old Dutch word (related to the Middle Dutch kerspel) that originally referred to a parish, specifically, a church district or community centred around a church. The name Bovenkarspel sets the settlement apart from other areas within the municipality of Stede Broec, which are named after the former swampland characteristic of the region.

Thus, Bovenkarspel means "Upper Parish". Place names derived from parishes are common in the Netherlands, reflecting the historical development of settlements around churches. Similar names occur in the region, including Hoogkarspel and Sijbekarspel.

== History ==
=== Prehistory ===
Prehistoric occupation of the area now known as Bovenkarspel dates back to the Neolithic and Bronze Age periods, when the region of West Friesland was characterised by a landscape of peat bogs and sand ridges. Archaeological evidence indicates that early inhabitants settled primarily on these elevated sandy grounds, which were more suitable for habitation than the surrounding wetlands.

Archaeological excavations in and around Bovenkarspel have uncovered traces of prehistoric dwellings, artefacts, and agricultural activity. The region is also notable for numerous burial mounds. One key site, known as Het Valkje, provides important archaeological insights into the region's history. Excavations there revealed evidence of prehistoric settlement through structural remains and material culture, including traces of a Bronze Age farmhouse and associated artefacts, demonstrating the area's long-standing human presence and early land use. The Zuiderzee Museum in Enkhuizen houses a reconstruction of this farmhouse. The discovery of farmhouses reflect a shift toward more permanent, agrarian settlements. These early settlements often featured wooden buildings constructed on raised terps or natural elevations to protect against flooding.

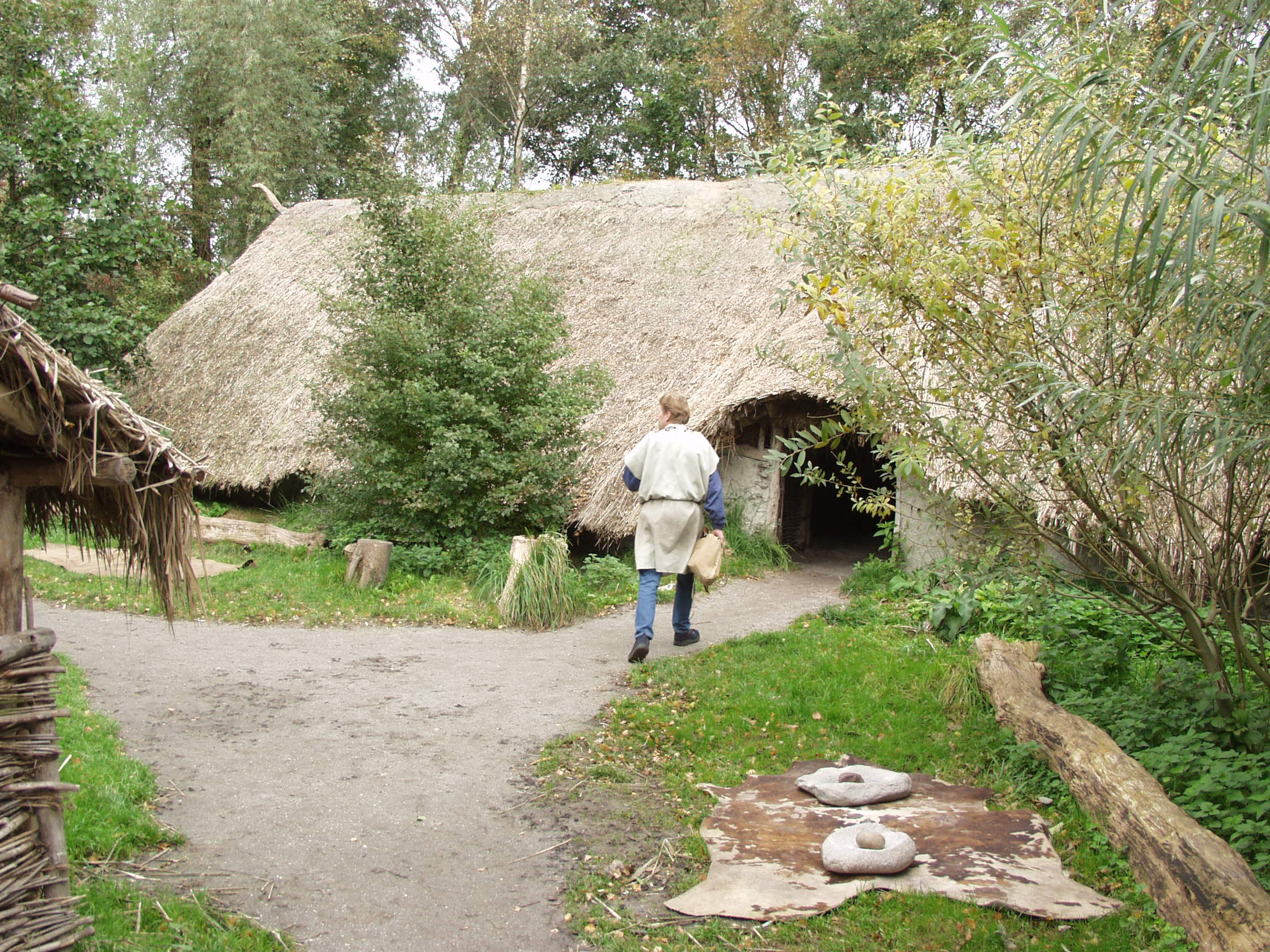
Bronze Age farmhouse modelled after Het Valkje (Zuiderzee Museum)

The prehistoric landscape illustrates how early communities adapted to changing environmental conditions of the West Frisian coastal area, balancing settlement on higher sandy grounds with exploitation of surrounding wetland resources.

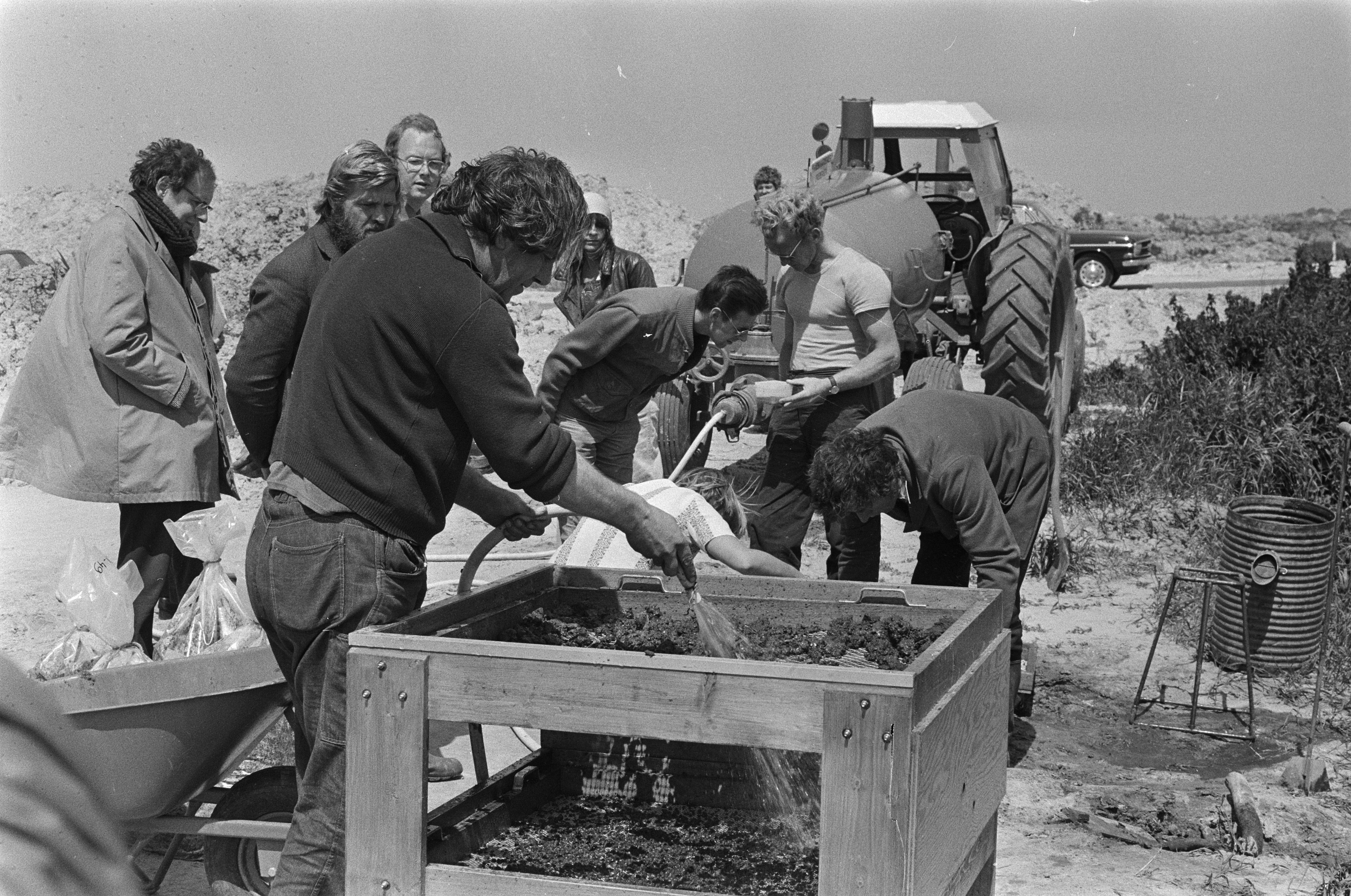
Excavation work in the Grootslag polder near Bovenkarspel (1974)

=== Stede Broek ===
During the Middle Ages, Bovenkarspel was part of the medieval administrative area known as Stede Broek or Stede Grootebroek. The name Bovenkarspel first appears in historical documents as early as 1193, when it was listed among the possessions of the chapter of Saint Martin in Utrecht, with a recorded population of approximately 200 inhabitants.

In 1289, Count Floris V conquered West Friesland, including the banne Broek area, which encompassed Bovenkarspel. Given the reputation of the West Frisians as independent and difficult to govern, Count Floris allowed them some autonomy with their own rules within the banne.

Although Christian structures and parish organisation predated Floris V’s conquest, the formal process of Christianisation and consolidation of authority in the region intensified during his rule. Archival material suggests that this process was gradual and met with resistance. North of the neighbouring village of Grootebroek, a monastery founded by monks from Hemelum in Friesland played a crucial role in the area's religious and environmental management, especially following the All Saints' Flood of 1170. The monks were heavily involved in maintaining dykes and constructed water barriers to protect the villages and farmland, but they disappeared after 1322. The flood of 1170 proved that collective action was necessary, leading to the construction of the Westfriese Omringdijk, which was completed just in time to protect the region from the St. Lucia's flood.

In 1364, Bovenkarspel and Grootebroek were jointly granted city rights and the privilege to hold an annual market by Duke Albert of Bavaria. Governance was placed in the hands of aldermen, consisting of eight representatives from Grootebroek and six from Bovenkarspel, assisted by a schout. From the 15th century onward, land reclamation made the marshy terrain more arable, leading to a relatively prosperous farming community. The farmers were free people rather than serfs, as was common in many other regions. Inland fishing also provided a good income.

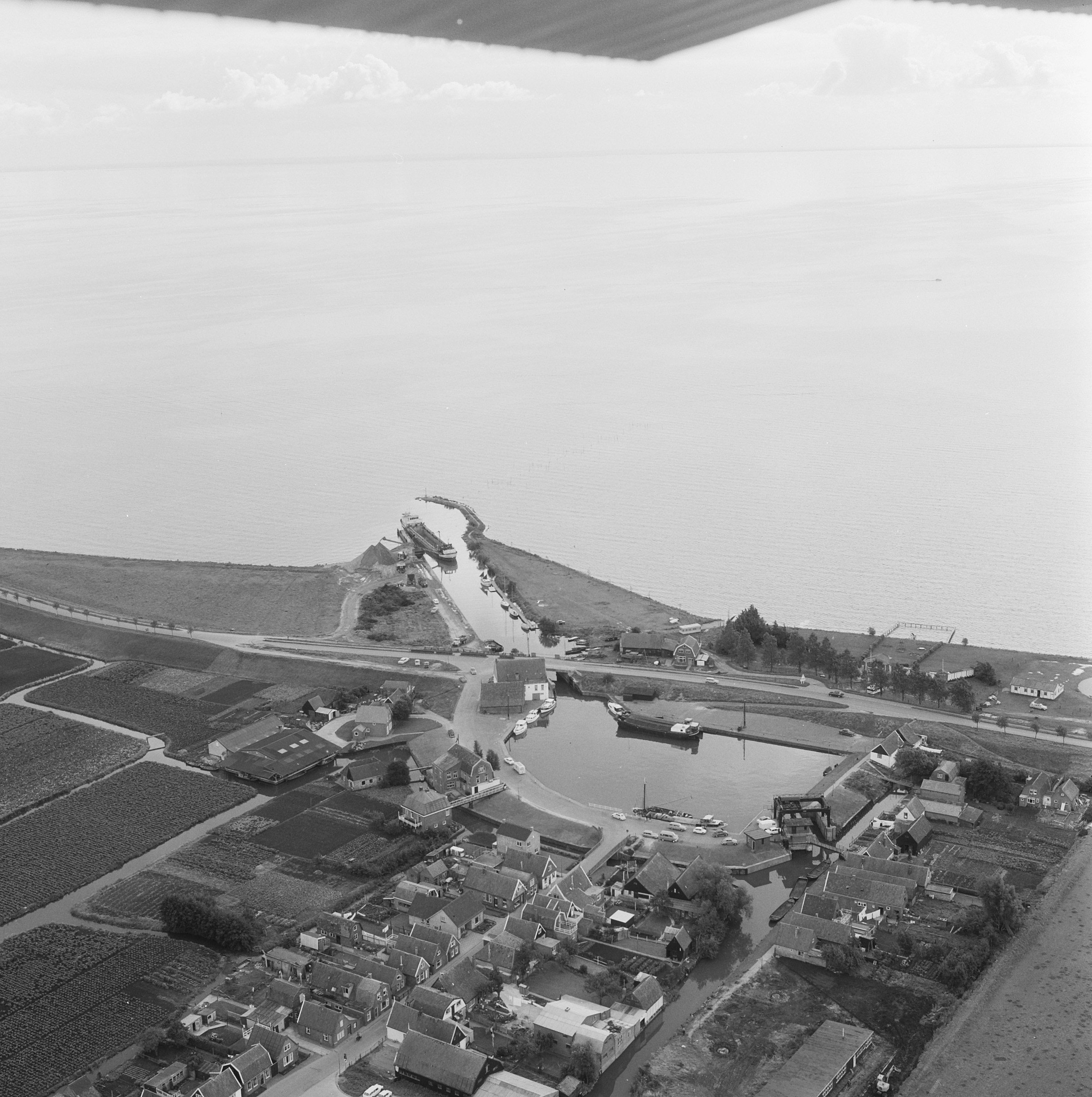
Aerial picture of Broekerhaven (1968)

The citizens of Stede Broek sought to control their own maritime trade in the 15th century by establishing a dedicated harbour, a move opposed by the nearby city of Enkhuizen. They submitted a plan to Philip of Burgundy, who approved the project, and in 1449 the Broekerhaven harbour was opened. This helped Bovenkarspel and the surrounding area benefit from the prosperity of maritime trade through the Zuiderzee as far as the Baltic Sea. To facilitate the movement of polder boats into the harbour, a manually operated boat lift (Dutch: overtoom) was installed. The traditional lift has since been replaced by the electrically powered Overhaal and remains in operation.

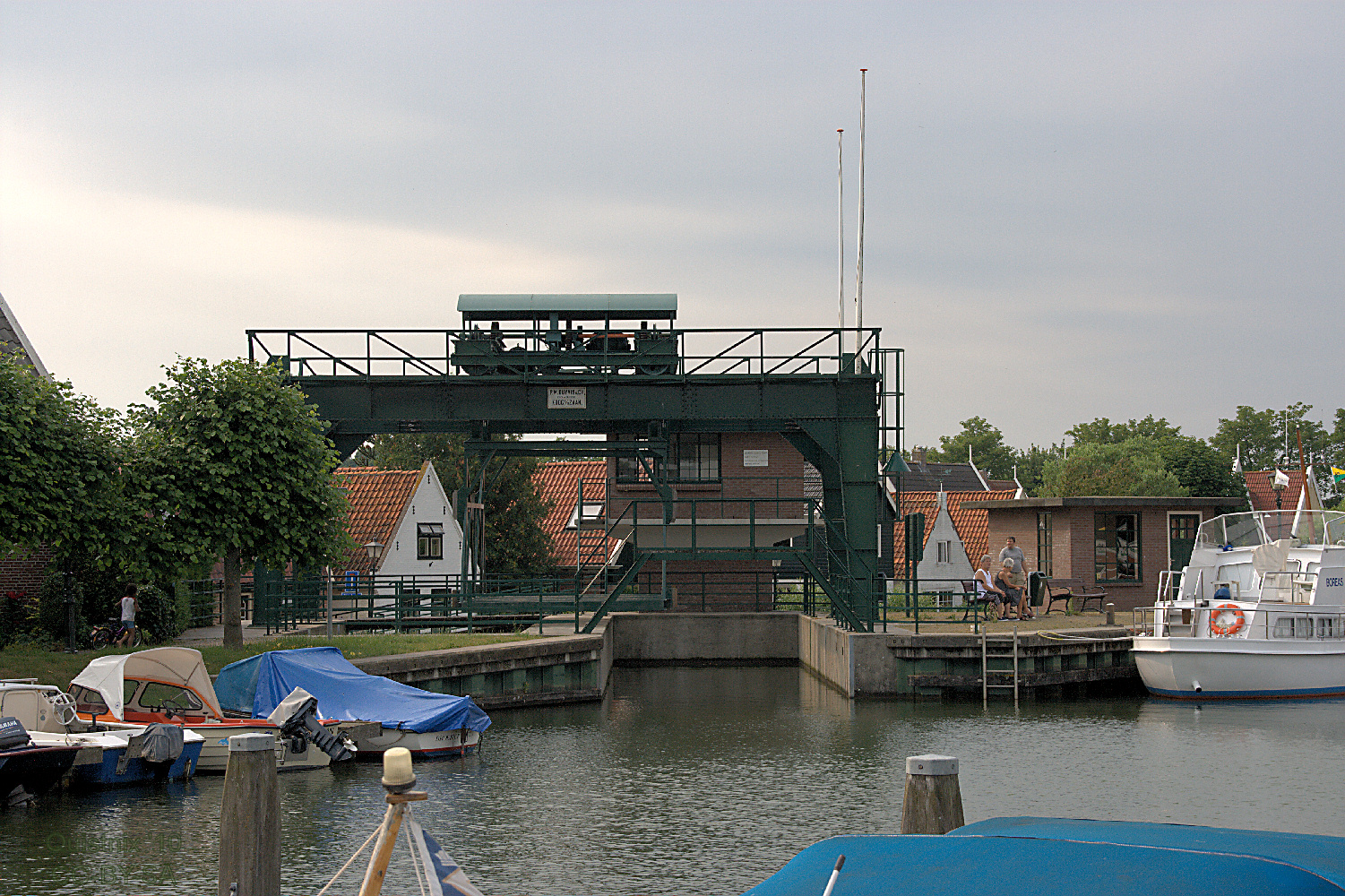
The "Overhaal" boat lift in Broekerhaven

In 1591, a road was constructed between Hoorn and Enkhuizen, passing directly through Bovenkarspel. Prior to this, the connection consisted mainly of a muddy path with uneven surfaces. The lack of an organised waste disposal system led residents to discard waste along the route, which was then compacted by horse-drawn traffic, resulting in difficult and unreliable travel.

During the period of the Spanish Netherlands, Bovenkarspel’s residents, alongside those in Grootebroek and neighbouring villages, were governed by appointed burgomasters responsible for tax collection and communal administration. Historical records highlight difficulties in tax collection; a decree from King Philip II of Spain required all residents of Stede Grootebroek, including Bovenkarspel, to submit their tax payments within fourteen days after announcement in the church, under penalty of additional fines.

=== Dutch Golden Age ===
Due to its location between the port cities of Enkhuizen and Hoorn, both important centres of maritime trade during the Dutch Golden Age, Bovenkarspel played a modest but supportive role in the regional economy. As trade between the two cities increased, infrastructure improvement became necessary. In the first half of the 17th century, a paved road was constructed using cobblestones, replacing the muddy and poorly maintained route. Completed in 1671 and later extended to Amsterdam in 1811, the new road significantly enhanced transportation and regional connectivity.

This infrastructure improvement further stimulated local agriculture. Farmers in Bovenkarspel saw their markets expand, selling produce to growing urban populations and provisioning ships. The local economy also benefited from fisheries and trade through Broekerhaven, which had developed into an active port. This increased trade activity marked a period of relative prosperity for the region.

=== Late 17th - 18th Century ===
Following the Dutch Golden Age, Bovenkarspel experienced a prolonged period of economic hardship. The decline of trade, shipping, and fishing in West Friesland’s port cities had a direct impact on the local agricultural economy. Farmers found it increasingly difficult to sell their produce. A major flood in 1675 had caused widespread damage, and further setbacks followed throughout the 18th century.

Multiple outbreaks of rinderpest led to significant livestock losses, further reducing agricultural productivity. In many cases, financial strain forced farmers to abandon their land, which often reverted to state ownership. A series of disasters further exacerbated the situation: a large fire devastated Grootebroek in 1694, a failed harvest in 1698 caused food shortages, and the extreme winter of 1740 brought additional hardship. Further fires occurred in 1750 (Grootebroek) and in 1763 (Lutjebroek). Appeals for assistance raised nearly 35.000 guilders, but the combined effects of these events contributed to a significant population decline. Church records show that the number of adult Catholics in Bovenkarspel decreased from 1.050 in 1645 to just 198 by 1723.

Infrastructure also became a pressing concern. In 1731, the discovery of shipworm damage to the wooden foundations of the dykes prompted emergency action. Local officials, including the burgomasters of Stede Broek, proposed reinforcing the dykes with large stones. Initially sourced from Drenthe by dismantling hunebeds, these stones were later imported from Norway and Denmark. The high costs of these reinforcements were passed on to the local population, adding to the financial strain.

During the French occupation around 1800, internal disagreements among local authorities contributed to the weakening of the Stede Broek union. In 1825, the municipality was formally dissolved and Bovenkarspel became a separate municipality. Proposals to merge it with neighbouring municipalities emerged as early as 1849 but were unsuccessful.

=== 19th Century ===
On 26 June 1816, Bovenkarspel was granted a coat of arms. It features a green tree, symbolising justice traditionally administered under a linden tree, along with two golden stars representing Bovenkarspel and Broekerhaven. In 1849, the village's windmill was replaced by the current one.

During the 19th century, agriculture became increasingly important to the economy of Bovenkarspel. The village and region gradually developed into a key supplier of vegetables for many Dutch cities. Horticulture emerged as a vital pillar of local prosperity. Initially, produce was transported primarily by boat, as the waterways of West Friesland offered the most practical transport routes. Overland travel remained difficult due to poorly maintained, unpaved roads. Efforts to improve road infrastructure were limited, partly due to concerns in port cities that better roads might undermine their dominance in waterborne trade.

Around 1880, the first tram lines, both rail-bound and horse-powered, were introduced in and around Bovenkarspel. The construction of the railway between Hoorn and Enkhuizen, completed by 1884, connected Bovenkarspel to nearby cities such as Alkmaar and Medemblik. These developments significantly improved Bovenkarspel’s accessibility and expanded market opportunities for its horticultural produce.

Despite the growth of horticulture and better transport connections, poverty remained widespread in Bovenkarspel. During harvest seasons, farmworkers worked long hours under physically demanding conditions for low pay.

=== 20th Century ===
Until World War II, living conditions in Bovenkarspel remained relatively poor despite some infrastructural improvements, such as the introduction of electricity and water supply networks. The completion of the Afsluitdijk in 1932, which closed off the Zuiderzee, brought an end to the herring fishing industry that had been part of the local economy.

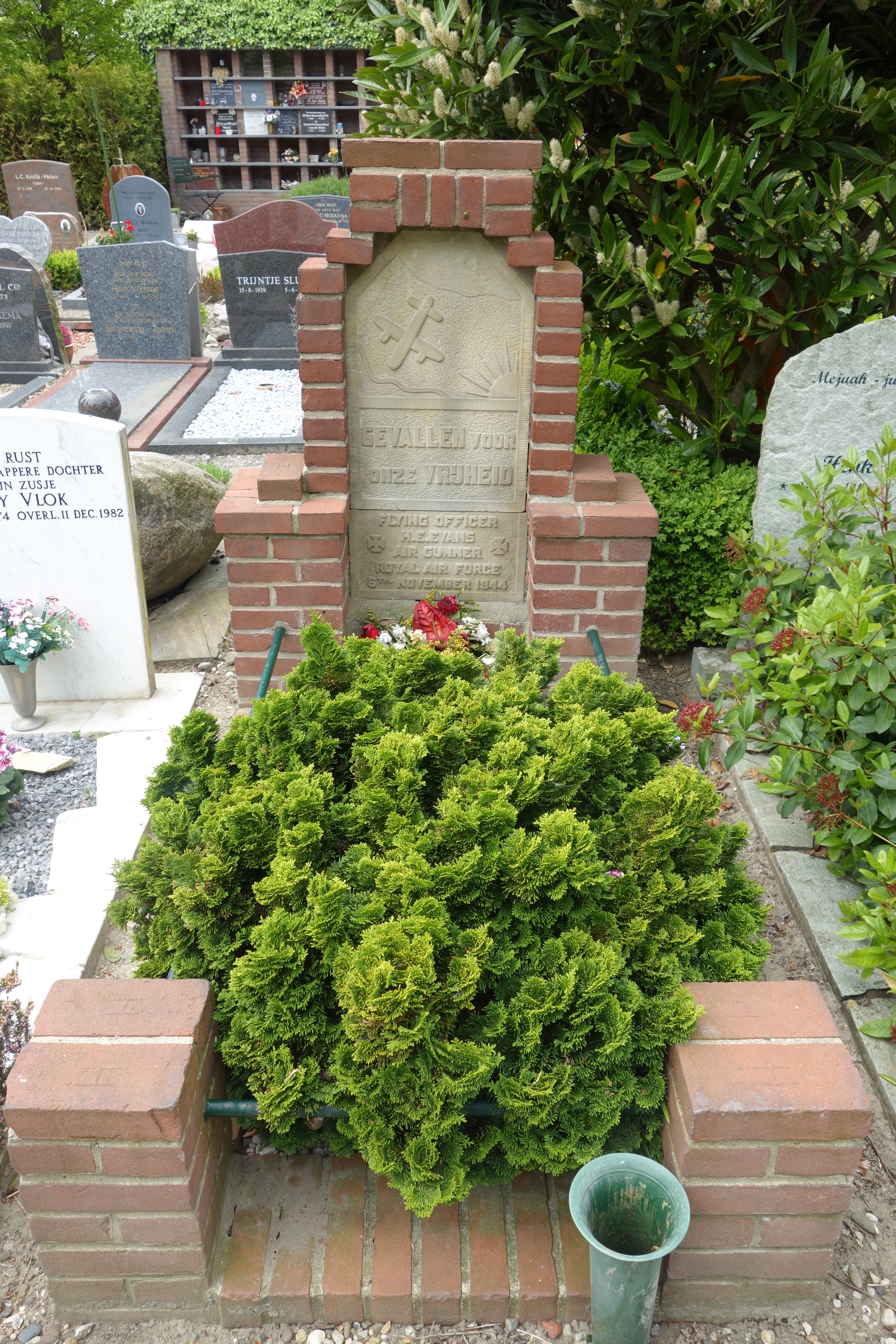
Commonwealth War Grave of Henry E. Evans, flying officer in the RAF Volunteer Reserve, in Bovenkarspel

During the German occupation in World War II, Bovenkarspel, like the rest of the Netherlands, endured significant hardships. Following the German invasion on 10 May 1940, the local population faced restrictions including curfews.

A significant event from this period involved the German-Jewish Fröhlich family, who went into hiding in Bovenkarspel during the final months of the war. Georg Fröhlich, a lawyer originally from Germany, his wife Edith, and their daughter Sabine were sheltered by the family of Mayor Elders in a house later known as Huize Elastiek. While in hiding, Fröhlich kept a diary in Dutch, documenting their daily life and the threat of discovery. The diary has since become a documented source offering insight into the daily realities of Jewish families in hiding and the risks undertaken by those who protected them.

Bovenkarspel was liberated by Canadian forces on 10 May 1945 at approximately 14:00. Celebrations took place the same day, including a procession through the village in the evening. In the immediate post-war period, local authorities prosecuted several collaborators, including a local grocer who was sentenced to five years' imprisonment for the betrayal of a Jewish resident. Several war graves in local cemeteries commemorate those who lost their lives during the conflict and occupation.

The post-war era brought significant structural changes to Bovenkarspel. Due to overcrowding and poor living conditions in major cities such as Amsterdam, and societal changes such as a wealthier middle class, suburbanisation increased. The village, which had resembled a linear settlement up until that point, underwent residential development both to the north and south of the railway.

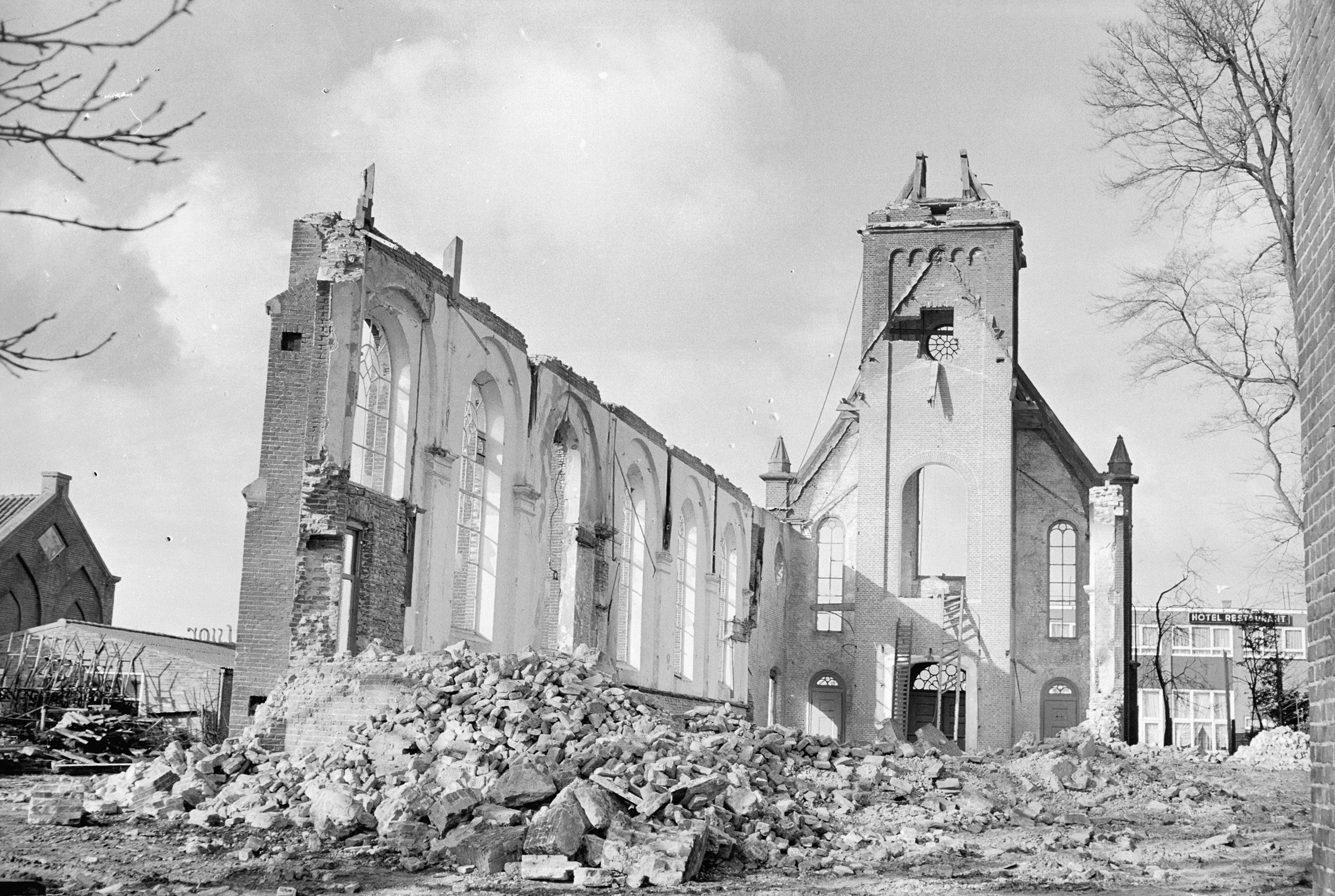
Demolition of the reformed church (1968)

In the 1960s, Bovenkarspel experienced substantial redevelopment. Streets were widened to accommodate increasing car traffic, resulting in the demolition of numerous buildings. Around the same time, the Saint Martin's Parish was demolished and replaced by a modern church featuring a minimalist design and a new bell tower. Other notable demolitions included the reformed church, the original railway station building, a hotel, and several traditional farmhouses.

In 1979, Bovenkarspel merged with the neighbouring municipalities of Grootebroek and Lutjebroek to form the new municipality of Stede Broec. The area surrounding the Bovenkarspel-Grootebroek railway station was developed into a central hub with the construction of a new town hall and the Streekhof shopping centre.

In February 1986, the world’s first black tulip was presented in Bovenkarspel, following seven years of cross-breeding deep purple tulip varieties.

=== 1999 Legionellosis outbreak ===
In March 1999, an outbreak of Legionnaires' disease occurred during the Westfriese Flora flower exhibition. The outbreak resulted in 318 reported cases, with at least 32 fatalities. It is believed that additional victims may have died before the infection was identified. The source of the bacteria was traced to a hot tub within the exhibition area, and many affected individuals were hospitalised in nearby Hoorn. The outbreak led to the permanent discontinuation of the flower exhibition, which was established in 1933.

=== 21st Century ===
By the 21st century, Bovenkarspel has transitioned into a primarily residential and commuter town, with many residents employed in nearby cities. Although agriculture, particularly flower cultivation, remains an important part of the local economy, the area has experienced more growth in housing and services to support its expanding population.

On New Year's Eve 2019–2020, the town's historic "Ceres" windmill was severely damaged after a blaze sparked by fireworks destroyed the upper structure, leading to extensive restoration efforts. During the COVID-19 pandemic, Bovenkarspel drew national attention following an explosion outside a local COVID-19 test centre. The incident, believed to be related to unrest over pandemic restrictions, caused property damage but no reported injuries.

On 18 March 2022, the restored windmill was officially reopened by Princess Beatrix of the Netherlands, who unveiled a commemorative plaque at the site.

== Geography ==
Bovenkarspel is situated in the eastern part of the North Holland peninsula, on the northern shore of the Markermeer lake. It lies within the West Friesland region, characterised predominantly by low-lying, flat polder landscapes. The only elevated areas in the town are the dykes, which protect the land from flooding. Administratively, Bovenkarspel falls under the safety region Noord-Holland Noord and the jurisdiction of the Hollands Noorderkwartier water board.

The town is intersected by waterways and canals that have historically supported transport and irrigation. Its proximity to the Markermeer and the larger IJsselmeer lakes has influenced both the local climate and economic activities. The fertile soil of the region supports extensive agriculture, especially the cultivation of vegetables and flower bulbs.

Natural areas nearby, including Het Streekbos and surrounding polders, provide recreational spaces and function as green buffers that separate urban areas.

=== Climate ===
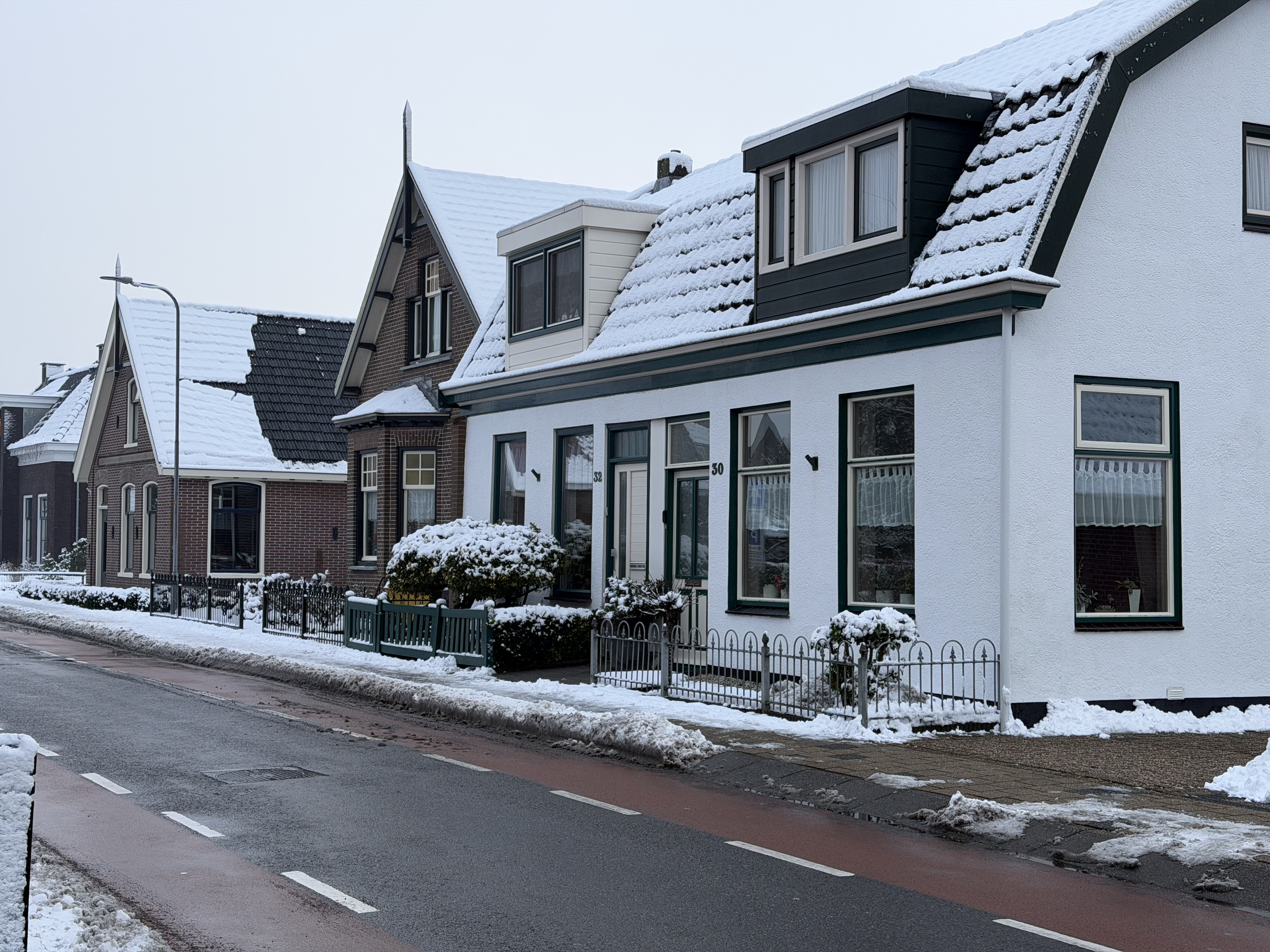
Snow in Bovenkarspel (2026)

Bovenkarspel has an oceanic climate (Köppen: Cfb) strongly influenced by its proximity to the North Sea to the west, with prevailing westerly winds.

Summers are moderately warm with average daily highs from June to August ranging between 19–21 °C (66–70 °F). Temperatures of 30 °C (86 °F) or higher occur on average 1.8 days per year (2009–2018), placing Bovenkarspel in AHS heat zone 2. The town receives the most sunshine during late spring and early summer. Winters are mild, with average high temperatures in January typically around 5 °C (41 °F). Snowfall occurs occasionally, with a few snowy days each year. Bovenkarspel, like much of North Holland, lies in USDA hardiness zone 8b. Frosts mainly occur during spells of easterly or northeasterly winds from continental Europe, but due to surrounding bodies of water, nighttime temperatures rarely fall far below 0 °C (32 °F).

Precipitation is relatively evenly distributed throughout the year, with annual totals between 800 and 900 millimeters (31 to 35 inches). The wettest months are August and October, while January and February tend to be the driest. Average wind speeds range from 3 and 4 on the Beaufort scale, with stronger winds occurring in autumn and winter.

== Demographics ==
As of 2025, Bovenkarspel has an estimated population of approximately 10,125 residents, representing a slight decline since 2014. The average household size is about 2.4 persons. Age distribution data indicates that around 25% of the population is between 45 and 65 years old.

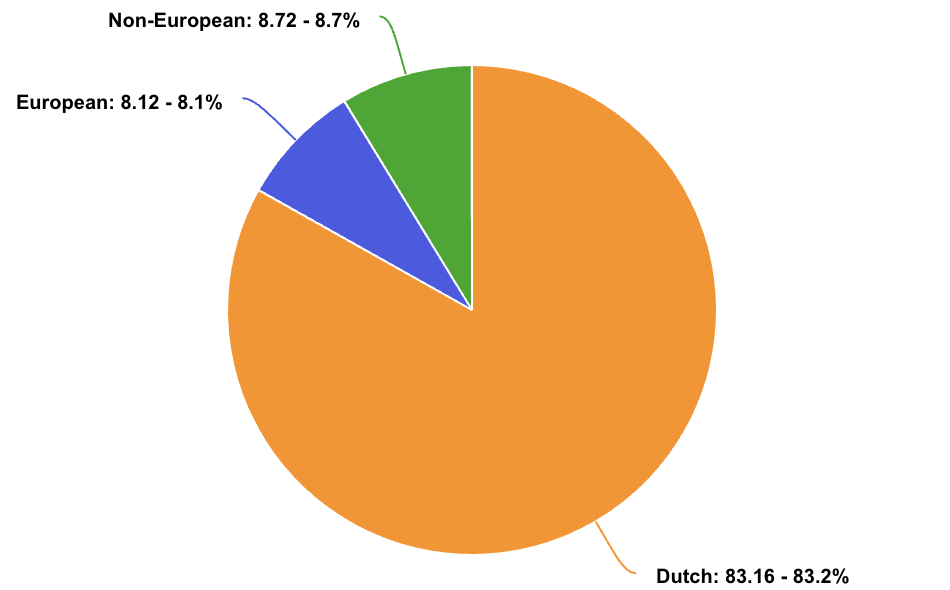
Population distribution of Bovenkarspel by native and migration backgrounds (2024)

The distribution of inhabitants in Bovenkarspel by place of origin was as follows: in 2013, 88% were of Dutch origin, 5.8% originated from other European countries, and 6.2% from countries outside Europe. By 2024, these figures shifted to 83% of Dutch origin, 8.1% from other European countries, and 8.7% from outside Europe. This change reflects a slight decrease in the Dutch-born population alongside an increase in residents with origins from other parts of Europe and beyond. The growth is largely driven by migration flows, including migration to and from Dutch cities as well as international migration from Eastern Europe, including Ukraine following the 2022 Russian invasion, and regions such as the Middle East and North Africa, mirroring broader demographic trends observed across the Netherlands.

=== Neighbourhoods ===
The town comprises four primary neighbourhoods: Bovenkarspel-Centrum, Broekerhaven, Plan Zuid en Princenhof, and Rozeboom. Among these, Plan Zuid en Princenhof is the most populous, with around 5,360 inhabitants according to Statistics Netherlands:

No.	Neighbourhood	Population	Zoning	Location within Stede Broec
1	Bovenkarspel-Centrum	2450	Residential, commercial, and agricultural	
2	Broekerhaven	850	Residential	
3	Plan Zuid en Princenhof	5360	Residential and commercial	
4	Rozeboom	2540	Residential	

== Culture ==
=== Landmarks ===
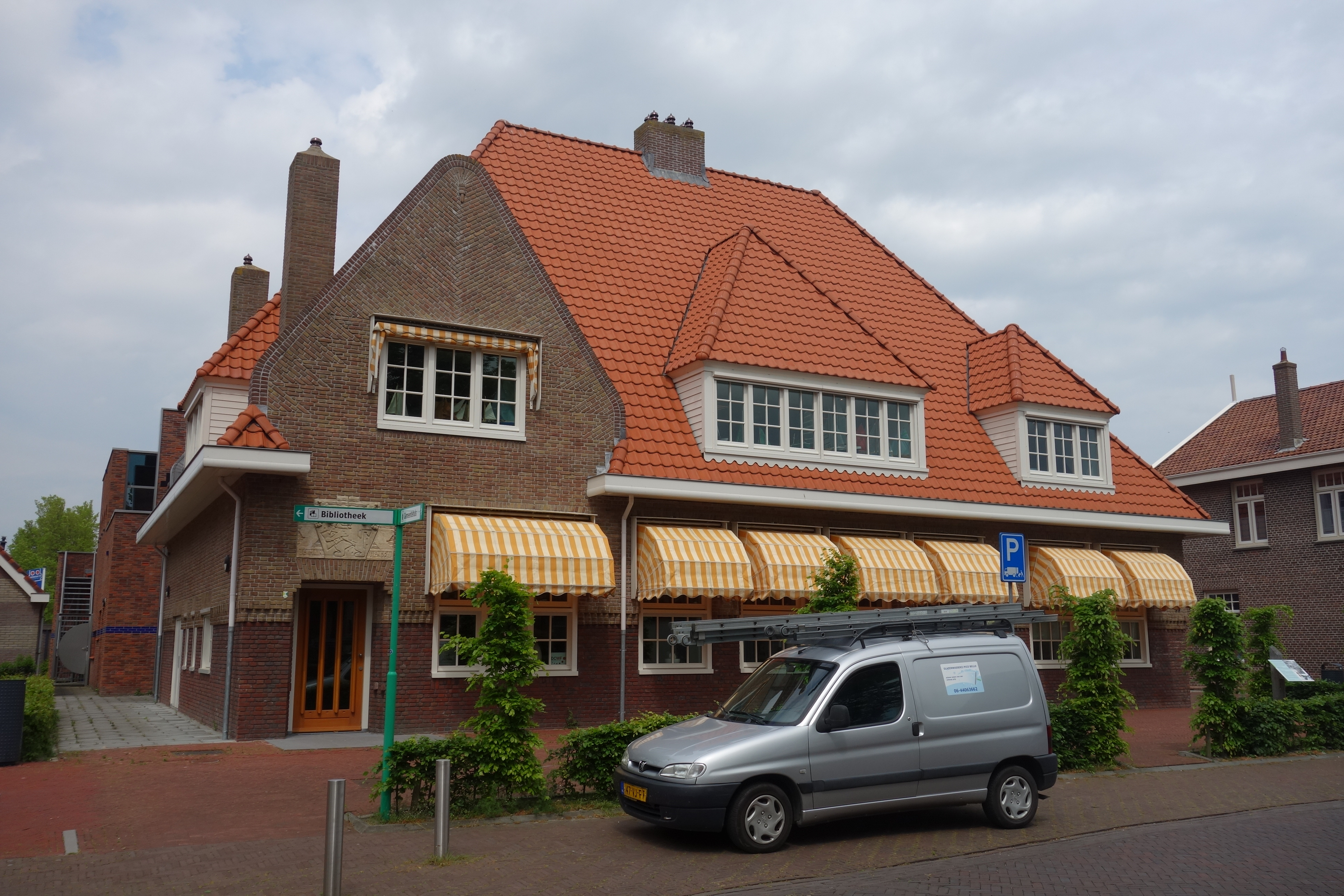
Former post office, now a performing arts theatre

- Ceres (1849), windmill
- Grootslag II (1907), pumping station
- Overhaal (1924), boat lift in Broekerhaven
- Saint Martin's Parish (1967), Catholic church

Several buildings on the main street are classified as monumental. The former post office has been redeveloped into a performing arts theatre.

=== Monuments ===
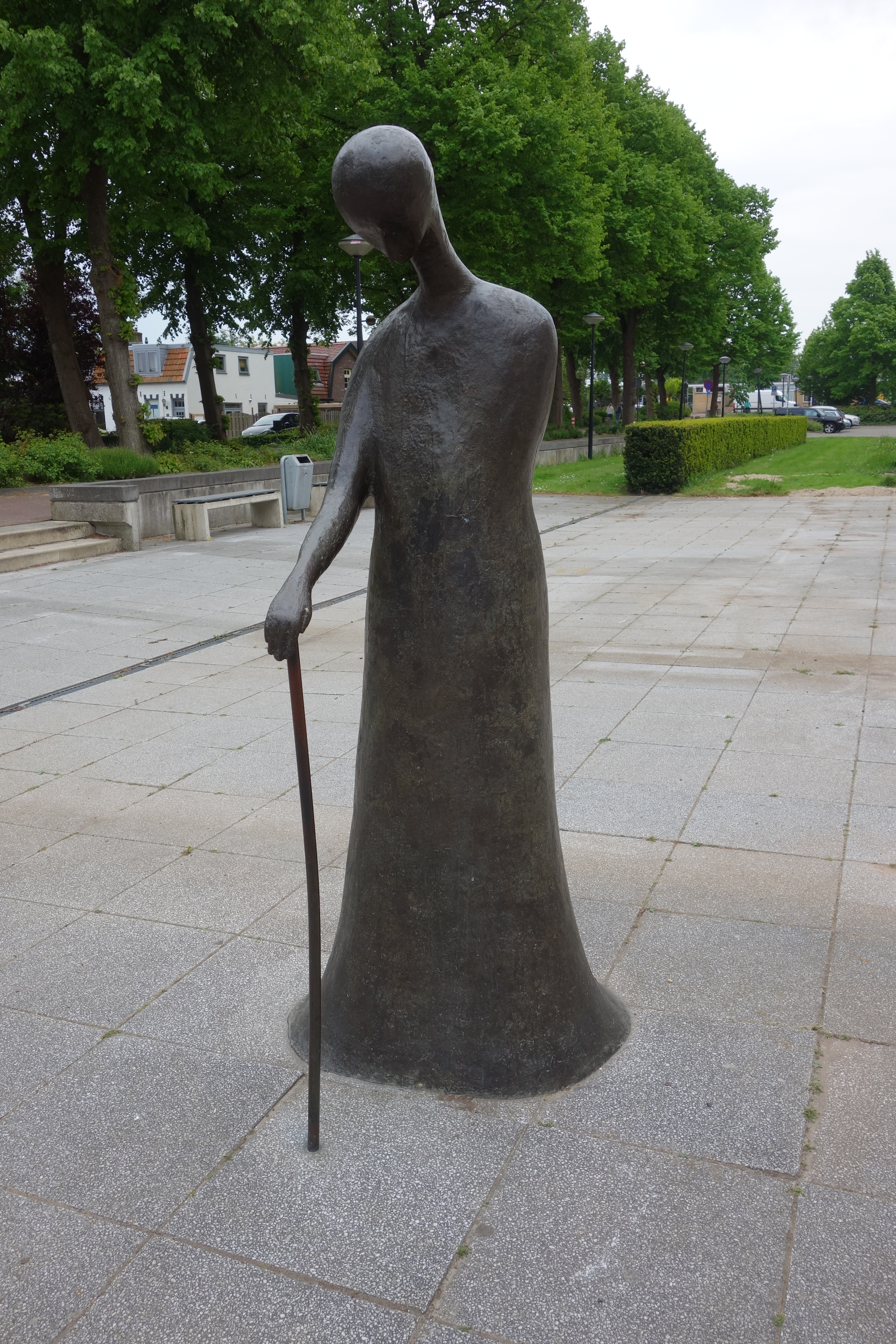
Wandelaar met Stok, war memorial

- Wandelaar met Stok (1998)
- Legionellamonument (2006)

=== Events ===
Bovenkarspel hosts several recurring cultural and community events throughout the year. The local fair, known as the kermis, takes place around Easter, accompanied by informal gatherings called borrels. In spring and autumn, music festivals such as the Grote Buurtfeest and Cube Outdoor Festival take place, featuring performances primarily of contemporary music genres.

During summer, the “Huttendorp” event allows children to build shelters and participate in group activities.

King’s Day is celebrated with markets, music, and public gatherings. The Avondvierdaagse walking event encourages participation from residents of all ages, especially elementary school students. A weekly market takes place every Thursday, providing a venue for local vendors and community interaction.

On 11 November, children walk the streets with lanterns, singing traditional songs in celebration of St. Martin’s Day, receiving candy in return. Also in November, the annual Sinterklaas parade marks the traditional arrival of Saint Nicholas.

Bovenkarspel also hosts cycling events and participates in the regional Ironman Triathlon competition.

== Education ==
Bovenkarspel is home to several primary schools including two Catholic schools (Basisschool Willibrordus, with 269 pupils, and Roman-Catholic De Molenwiek, with 292 pupils). The Gideonschool is a Protestant Christian school with 117 pupils. Due to declining enrolment, a location of ’t Vierspan ceased operations in 2025, having only 25 pupils at the time. The other location remains open and is the town's fourth primary school (De Klim-Op), with 69 pupils.

The town has two preschools, which offer early childhood education and development programmes for children aged two to four. Additionally, there are two out-of-school care facilities (BSO's) that provide supervised childcare.

There is no secondary school in Bovenkarspel. Most students attend Martinus College in Grootebroek or RSG Enkhuizen in Enkhuizen. These schools are easily accessible via bicycle or car. Following secondary school, students typically continue to MBO (secondary vocational education), HBO (higher professional education), or university-level education in cities such as Hoorn, Alkmaar, or Amsterdam.

Historically, the town had close ties to Catholic and Protestant education, with photographs from the 20th century showing former school buildings near the church and town centre.

== Sports ==
Bovenkarspel has a range of sporting facilities and clubs including multiple gyms, an archery club, a BMX track, and an indoor football centre. The town previously had a baseball and softball club, which closed in 2017. In winter, when the canals freeze, ice skating becomes a popular pastime. VV K.B.G., the local football club founded in 1931, plays in de Vijfde Klasse, the lowest tier of football in the Netherlands.

Local primary schools organize annual sports days that feature a variety of athletic competitions and traditional Dutch games, such as zaklopen (sack racing) and spijkerbroek hangen (hanging from suspended jeans for as long as possible).

== Transport ==
Bovenkarspel is well-connected by road to nearby towns and cities in North Holland. The town is primarily served by the N302 and N506 highways, providing access to places such as Hoorn, Enkhuizen, and the province of Flevoland via the Houtribdijk.

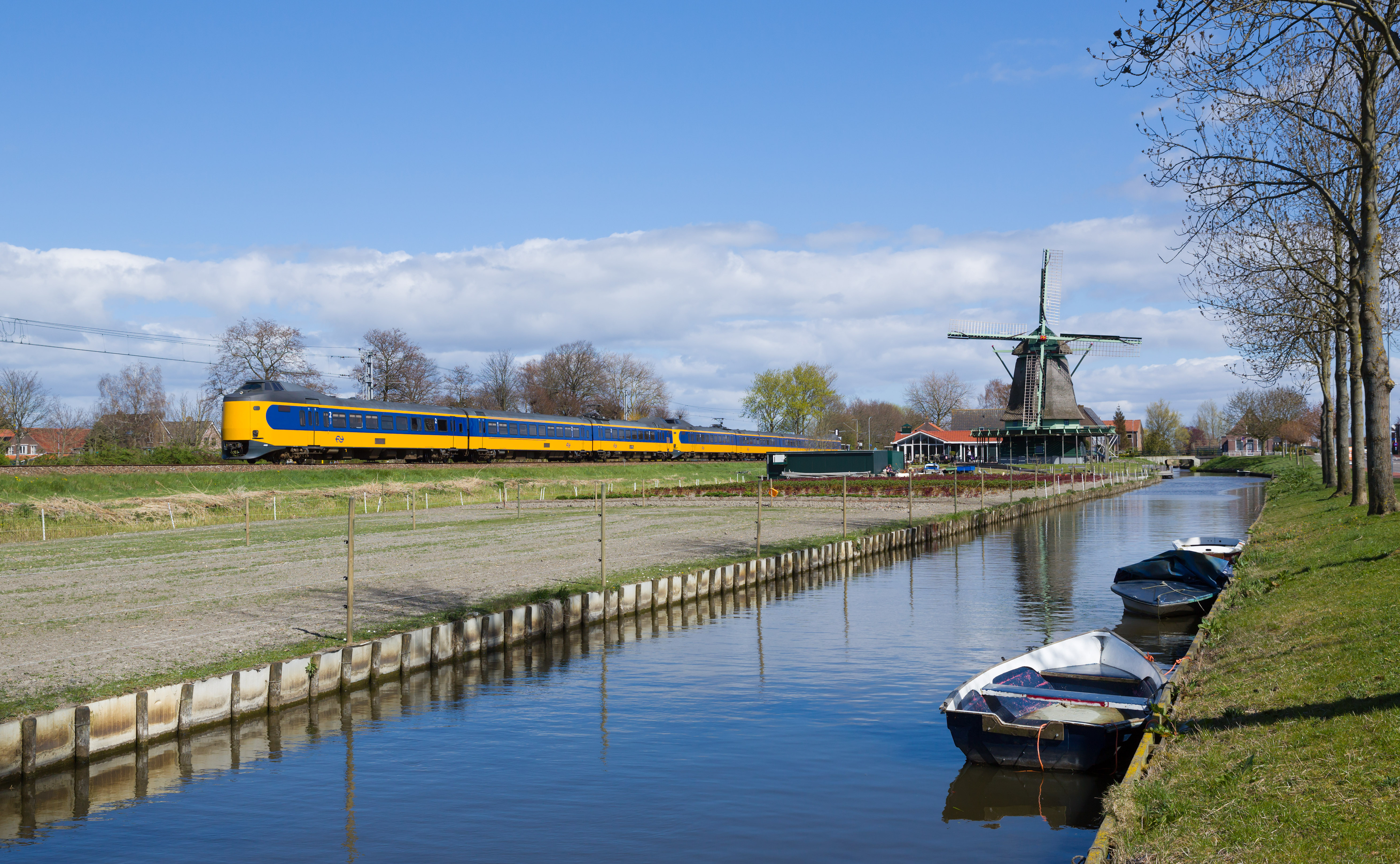
A NS InterCity train passing the windmill "Ceres"

Public transportation includes regional bus services that connect Bovenkarspel to surrounding areas within the municipality and beyond. For longer-distance travel, residents can use one of the town's two railway stations, Bovenkarspel-Grootebroek and Bovenkarspel Flora, which offer half-hourly connections to cities such as Hoorn, Amsterdam, and Heerlen/Maastricht.

== Notable people ==
The following is a list of notable people who were born in Bovenkarspel:

- Pieter Straat (ca. 1670-1752), poet, mayor, and water board official
- Jan Elders (1900-1992), mayor
- Johannes Willebrands (1906-2006), Catholic cardinal
- Henk Bosma (1915-2002), politician
- Gerard Visser (born 1950), philosopher
- Cor Dekker (born 1987), darts player
- Nina Buysman (born 1997), racing cyclist
