= Het Streekbos =

Recreation area in Bovenkarspel

Coordinates: 52°42′44.2″N 5°15′12.2″E

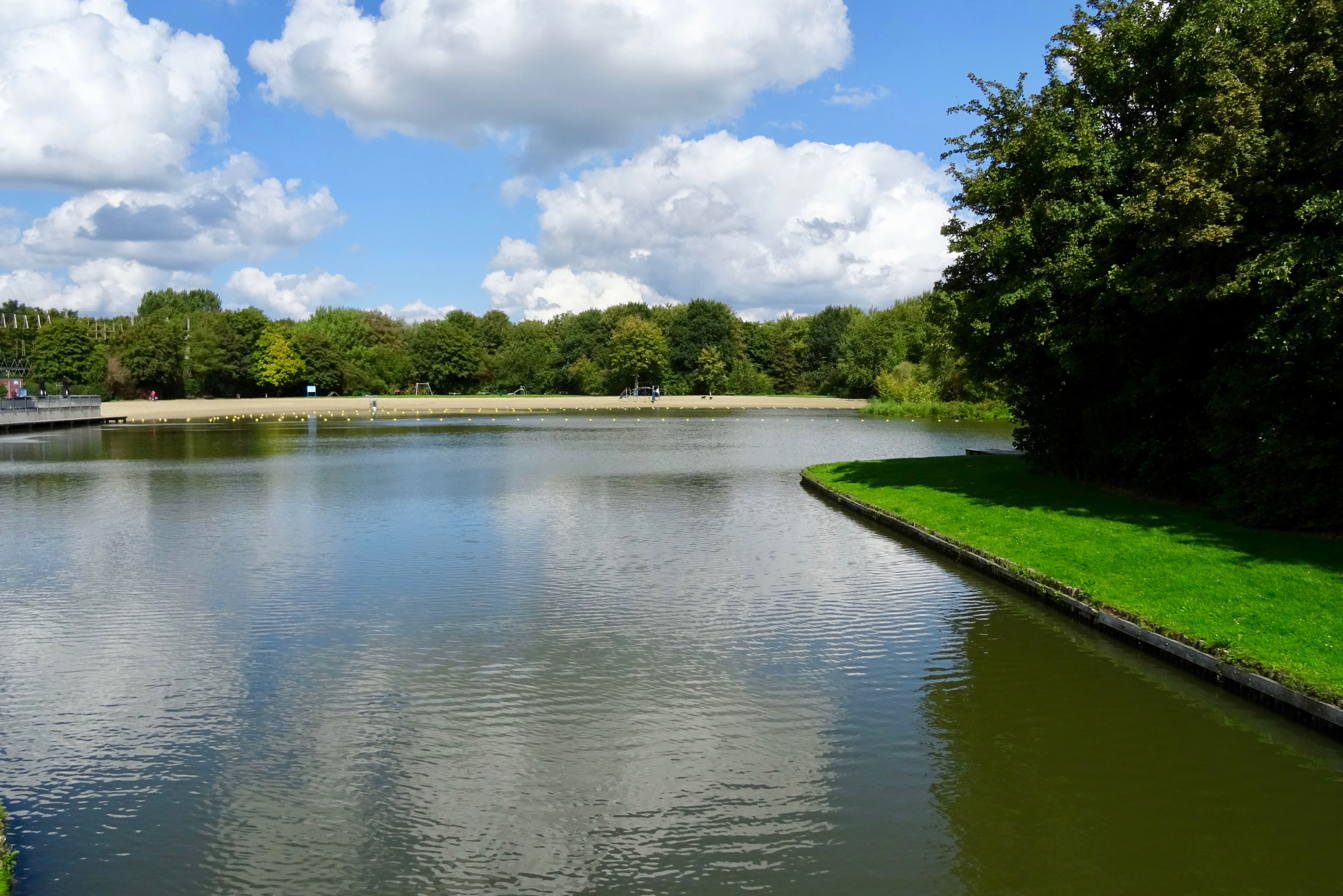
- Bathing lake at Het Streekbos
- Interactive map of Het Streekbos
- Type: Recreation area
- Location: Bovenkarspel, Stede Broec, Netherlands
- Area: 0.73 square kilometres (180 acres; 73 ha)
- Established: 1978
- Etymology: Area name
- Administered by: Recreatieschap Westfriesland
- Status: Open all year
- Hiking trails: 5
- Water: Lake
- Parking: Parking available
- Facilities: Forest, bathing lake, observatory, adventure park, playground, restaurant

Het Streekbos is a recreation area in Bovenkarspel, Netherlands, covering approximately 73 hectares. It is managed by the Recreatieschap Westfriesland and serves as a site for outdoor recreation and environmental education. The park borders the municipality of Enkhuizen to the east.

== History ==
Het Streekbos was created in 1978 as part of a land consolidation project in the Grootslag polder. A portion of the land was allocated for recreational purposes, which led to the development of the park. Many of the existing ditches predate the consolidation, preserving the historical structure of the area.

A significant development within Het Streekbos is the 'Ecoproject', initiated in 1996. This project transformed a former horticultural field into three islands where nature is allowed to develop with minimal human intervention. The islands became habitats for diverse flora and fauna. The project is maintained primarily through manual efforts by volunteers from IVN West-Friesland.

In 1986, biologist Roelof Horreüs de Haas and his son proposed to reconstruct a Bronze Age farmhouse on the islands, based on archaeological findings from Het Valkje which revealed traces of prehistoric settlement. The original structure had been built for the 1982 Floriade in Amsterdam and was dismantled afterward. The reconstruction was completed in February 1989 but was destroyed by fire three months later. Subsequently, the Zuiderzee Museum in Enkhuizen offered a site for rebuilding the farmhouse, which remains accessible to visitors.

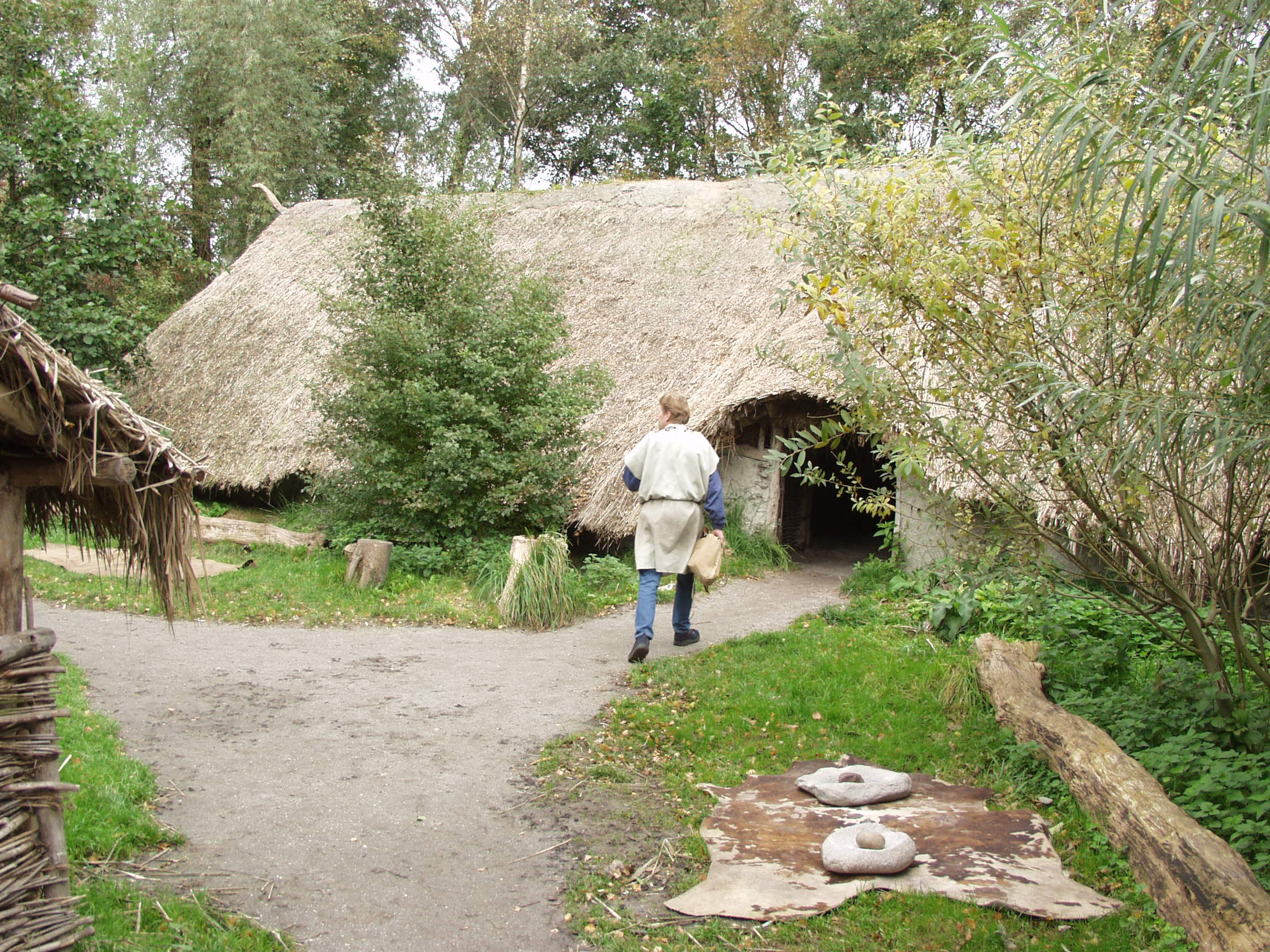
Bronze Age farmhouse modelled after the Bovenkarspel farmhouse at the Zuiderzee Museum

Further development in 2006 included the expansion of Het Streekbos, during which consideration was given to the area's Bronze Age history. In 2011, the Recreatieschap established the 'Archaeological Footprint' (Dutch: Archeologisch Voetspoor) featuring a layout of a Bronze Age farmhouse, enhancing the educational and historical value of the park.

== Facilities ==
Het Streekbos contains a variety of facilities intended for recreation, education, and nature observation. It includes a forest and a bathing lake featuring a beach and access for boats and canoes via adjacent waterways. Fishing is permitted in designated areas. Two cycling trails and five walking trails run throughout the area and connect to regional trail networks.

Near the entrance to the park, an adventure park featuring a climbing and miniature golf course attracts visitors. The park also houses the IVN West-Friesland nature education centre and the public observatory Volkssterrenwacht Orion, which offer nature and astronomy-related programs. A pavilion with a restaurant is located near the main access point to the park.

== Events ==
Several recurring events are hosted within Het Streekbos, including an Easter walk, an annual cross country run, and the UNICEF Loop West-Friesland, a charity event with walking and running activities. Every two years, the Streker Oerbos Survivalrun passes through the area, featuring obstacle courses that combine running, climbing, and canoeing.
