= Saint Martin's Parish =

Coordinates: 52.6992°N 5.2493°E

- Sint Martinus Parochie
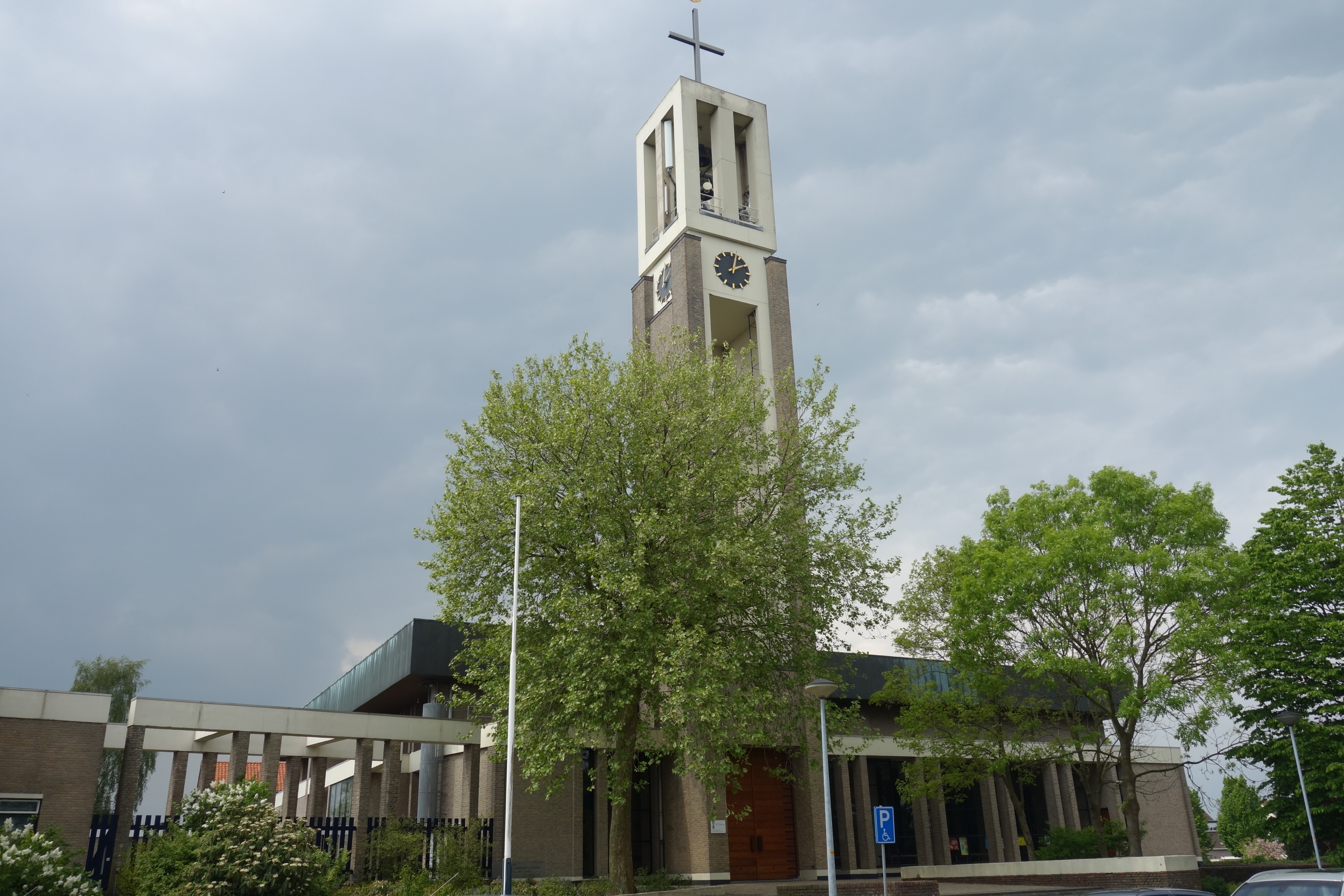
- Saint Martin's Parish
- Location: Bovenkarspel
- Address: Hoofdstraat 205, 1611 AE Bovenkarspel
- Country: Netherlands
- Website: https://www.sint.martinuskerk.nl/

Architecture
- Architect: Johannes Anthonius Lelieveldt
- Style: Modernism
- Completed: 1967

Administration
- Diocese: Roman Catholic Diocese of Haarlem–Amsterdam

The Saint Martin's Parish (Dutch: Sint Martinus Parochie) is a Roman Catholic church in Bovenkarspel, Netherlands. The original church, built in the late 19th century, was a prominent example of Neo-Gothic architecture. It featured a striking façade, pointed arch windows, and an imposing bell tower. The church served as a religious and cultural landmark for the town.

In the mid-20th century, it was demolished and replaced with a modernist-style church.

== Original church (1872-1965) ==
The original Saint Martin's Parish, completed in 1872, reflected the revivalist Gothic style popular in the Netherlands at the time. It featured a spacious interior with a large central nave and side aisles, adorned with stained glass windows and religious statues. Its towering façade and detailed crucifix made it a significant landmark in Bovenkarspel.

By the 1960s, concerns arose regarding the church’s structural integrity, and debates emerged about whether it should be restored or replaced. Ultimately, in 1964–65, the decision was made to demolish it, despite protests from parishioners who wished to preserve the historic building. Later research suggested that restoration and expansion would have been feasible, leading to lasting regret among heritage enthusiasts.

The fate of the original Saint Martin’s Parish was part of a broader trend during this period. The town’s Dutch Reformed Church, another historic landmark, was also demolished in the 1960s and replaced with a modernist structure, reflecting a shift away from traditional architecture.

== New church (1967-) ==
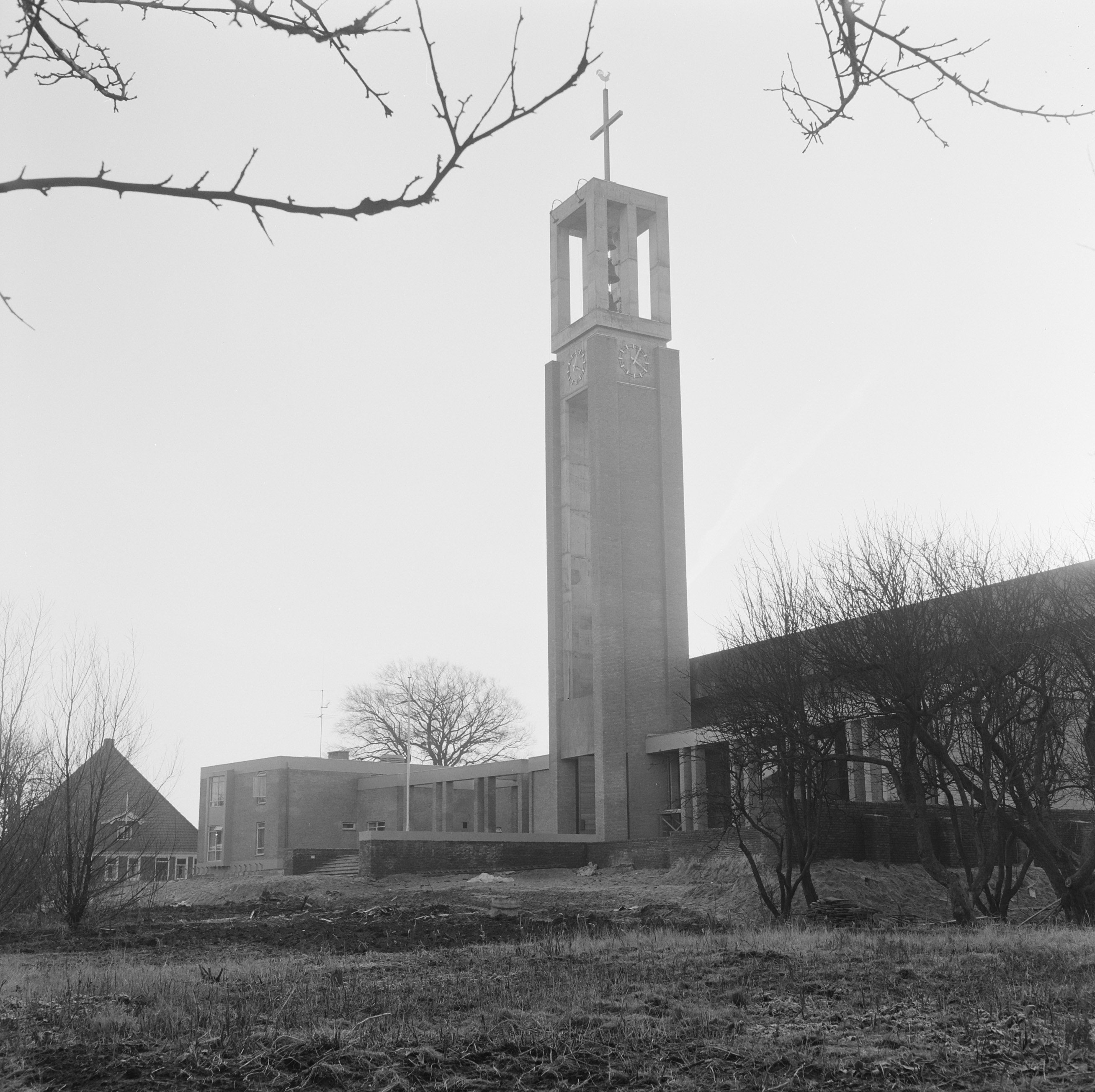
Modernist church after completion

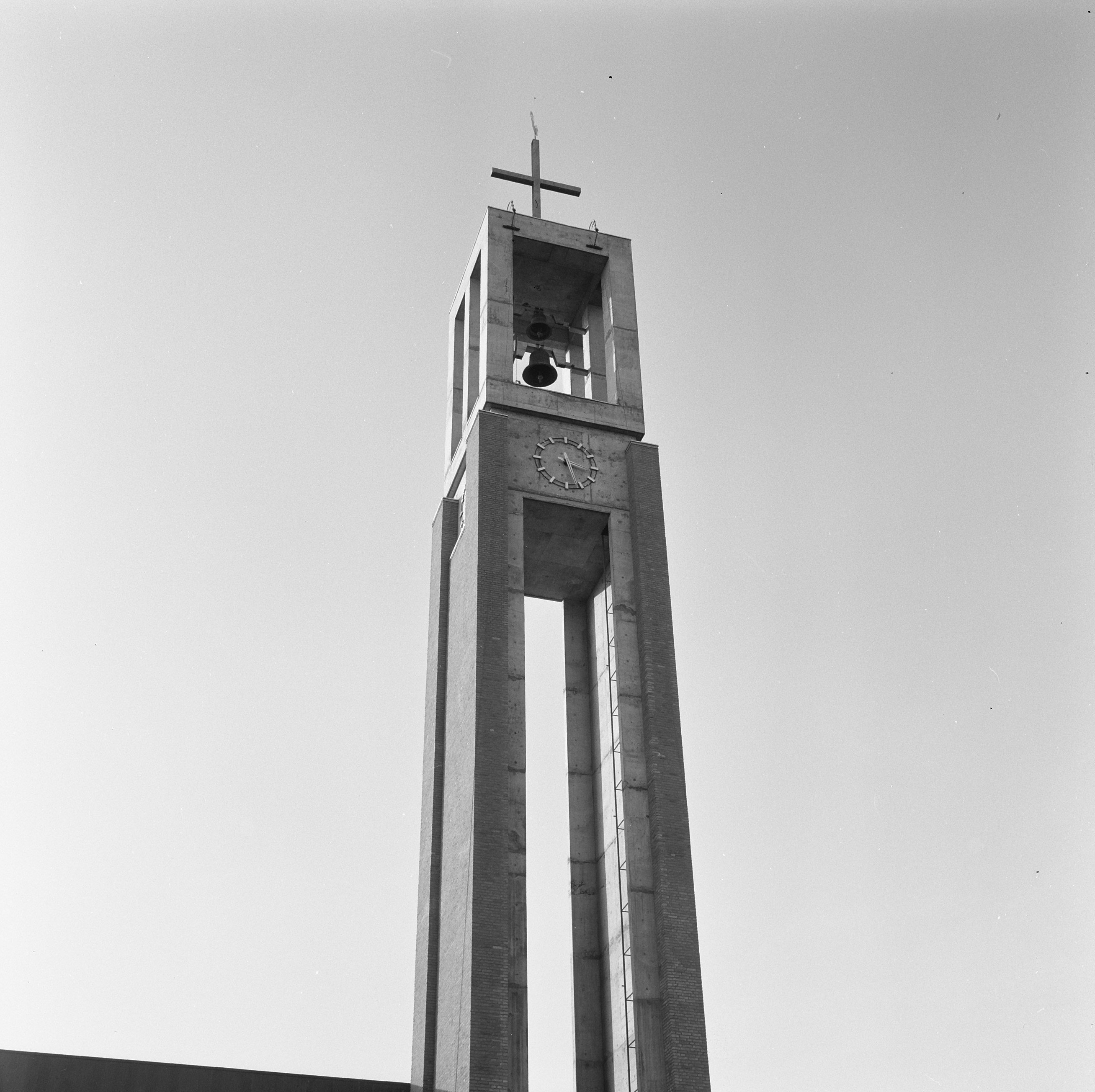
Modern-day church bell tower

Following the demolition, a new modernist-style church was built on the same site, featuring a minimalist design. While functional, it lacked the architectural grandeur of its predecessor. Later research revealed that the old church could have been restored and expanded instead of being demolished, leading to regret among historians and heritage enthusiasts. Its loss was seen as part of a broader trend in the 20th century where many historic buildings were replaced with modernist structures.

Though the original church no longer stands, its memory remains strong in Bovenkarspel. Old photographs, personal stories, and surviving artefacts continue to remind the town of the grandeur and importance of the historic church. The debate over its demolition has contributed to a greater awareness of heritage preservation in the region.
