= Ceres, Bovenkarspel =

Windmill in Bovenkarspel, Netherlands

Ceres
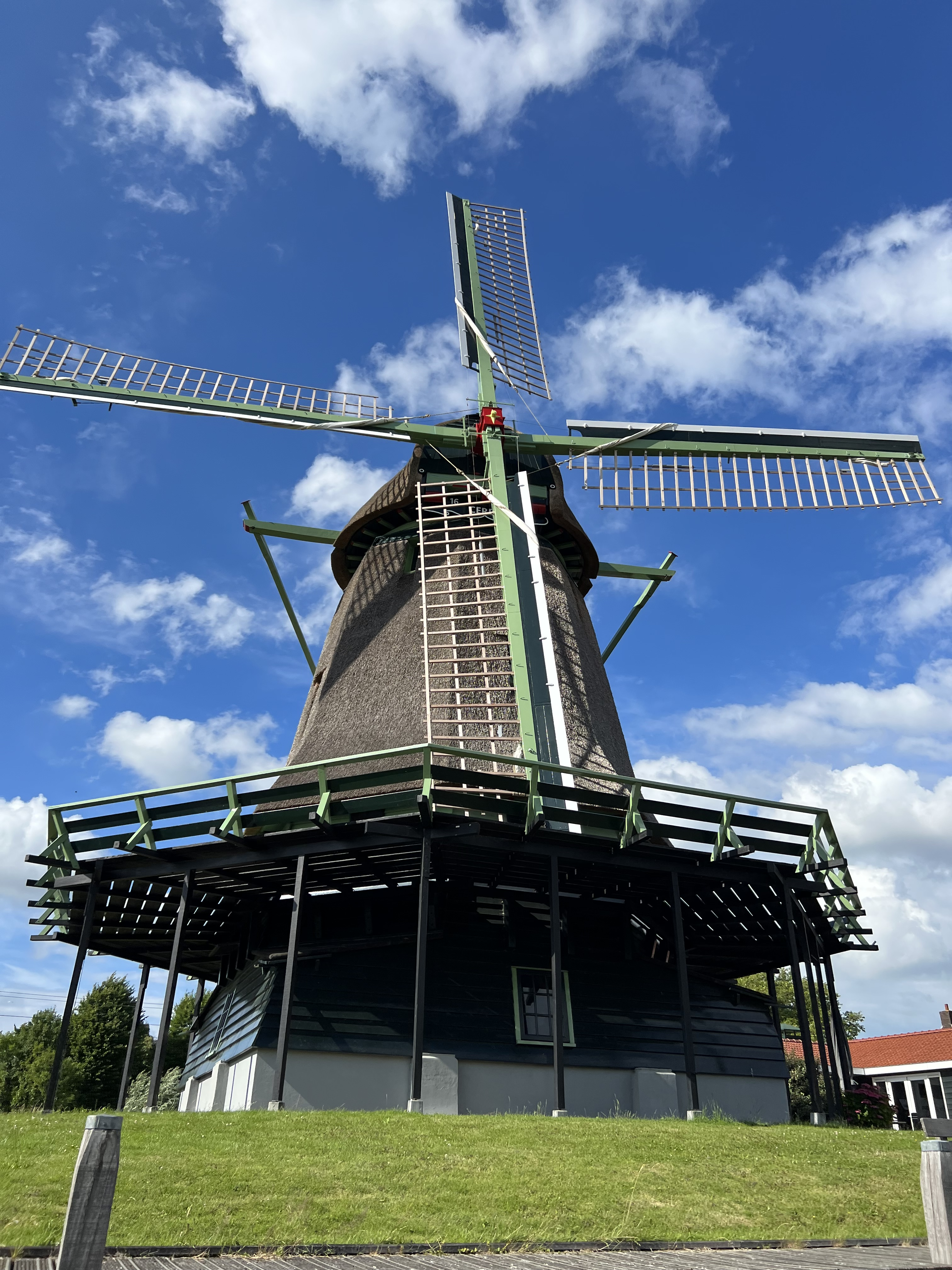
- Ceres, 2022

Origin
- Mill name: Ceres
- Mill location: Broekerhavenweg 80 1611 CH Bovenkarspel
- Coordinates: 52.69556°N 5.25167°E
- Operator: Stichting De Westfriese Molens
- Year built: 1849 (1998/2022)

Information
- Purpose: Gristmill
- Type: Smock mill
- Smock sides: Eight
- No. of sails: Four sails
- Type of sails: Common sails
- Windshaft: Cast iron
- Winding: Tailpole and winch

Ceres is an octagonal smock mill in Bovenkarspel, Netherlands. It was built in 1849 as a corn mill, using structural parts from a 17th-century oil mill. The mill’s wooden frame was originally part of De Oude Haas, an oil mill from Zaandijk. Initially called De Haas (the hare), the mill was renamed Ceres in 1908 after a local agricultural cooperative of that name purchased it.

The mill is listed as a Rijksmonument, number 34497. The mill remains in working order as a gristmill operated by volunteer millers, and after suffering severe fire damage in 2019 it was fully restored and officially reopened in 2022.

== History ==
Ceres was erected in 1849 on the Broekerhavenweg in Bovenkarspel to replace an earlier mill. Rather than being built entirely from new, it was constructed using the octagonal body and other parts salvaged from ''De Oude Haas'', a wind-powered oil mill that had stood in Zaandijk since before 1650. The timber was likely sourced from Sweden and felled around the 1660s. Initially named "De Haas," the mill operated as a ''korenmolen'' (gristmill), grinding grain for flour and animal feed.

In 1908, the mill was acquired by the Venhuizer Cooperative Agricultural Purchase Association, known as Ceres, and renamed accordingly. For decades, it was used by millers to grind cattle feed, using wind and later electric power. Milling ceased in 1968, though the sails were occasionally turned.

In 1986, ownership passed to Stichting De Westfriese Molens, and restoration efforts began in the 1990s. The mill was dismantled, repaired, and reassembled, resuming grain milling in 1998.

On 31 December 2019, the mill suffered a major fire caused by fireworks. Though much of the exterior was damaged, the wooden frame survived. Restoration began in 2020 with national support, and the mill was refitted with traditional sails and a newly constructed cap. It was formally reopened on 18 March 2022 in a ceremony led by Princess Beatrix.

== Description ==
Ceres is an ''achtkante bovenkruier'', an eight-sided smock mill with a rotating cap. It stands on a brick base integrated with a barn and features a stage for access to its four sails. Both the smock and cap are thatched with reed. The cap is turned manually using a tailpole and winch.

The mill uses a cast-iron windshaft to power two pairs of millstones. The current sails have automatic brake shutters, installed after the 2019 fire. Internally, the structure includes preserved oak and pine beams, and it once featured a ''pelsteen'' (pearl barley stone) on the stage level.

== Gallery ==
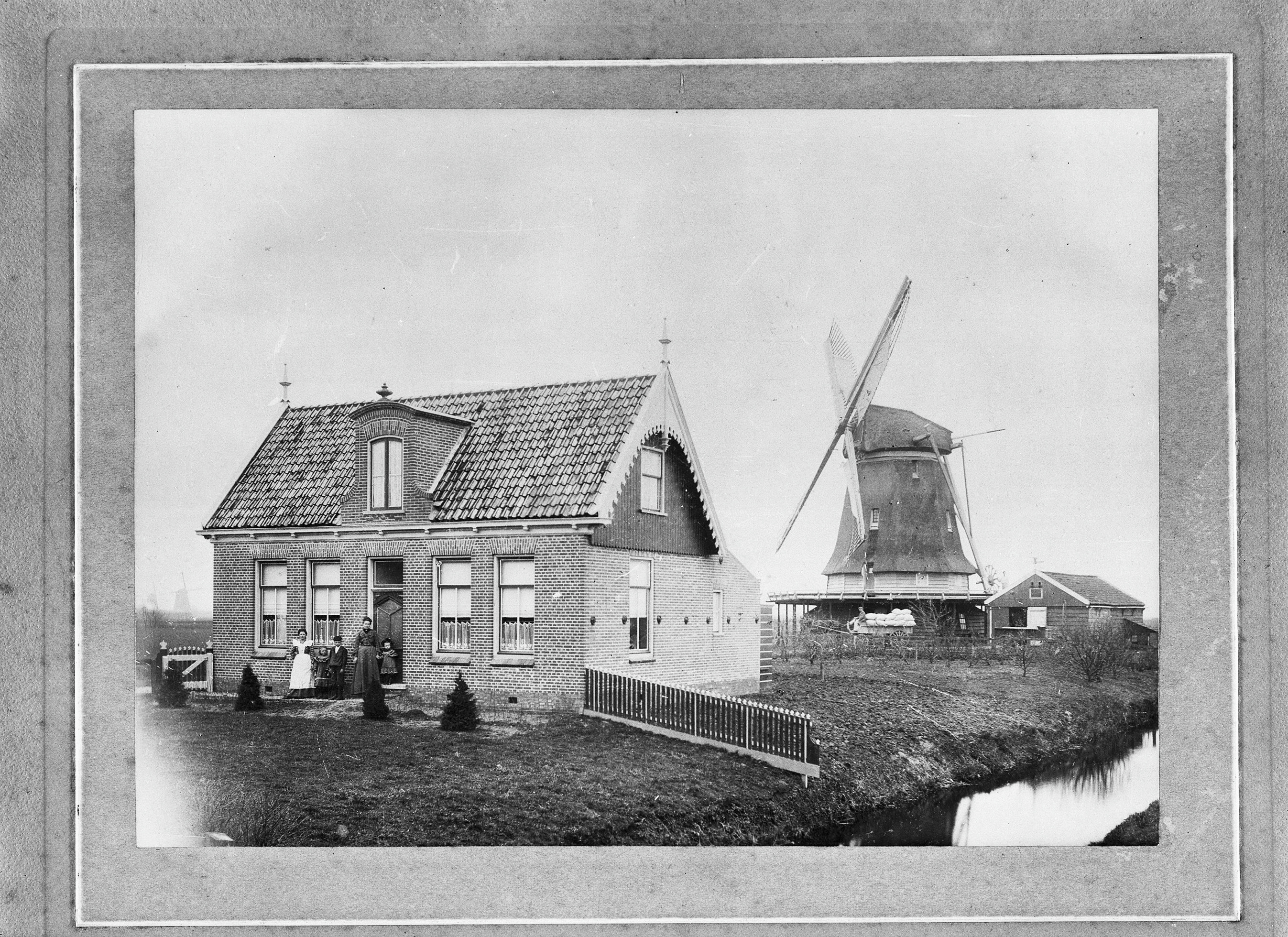
Ceres (1900)

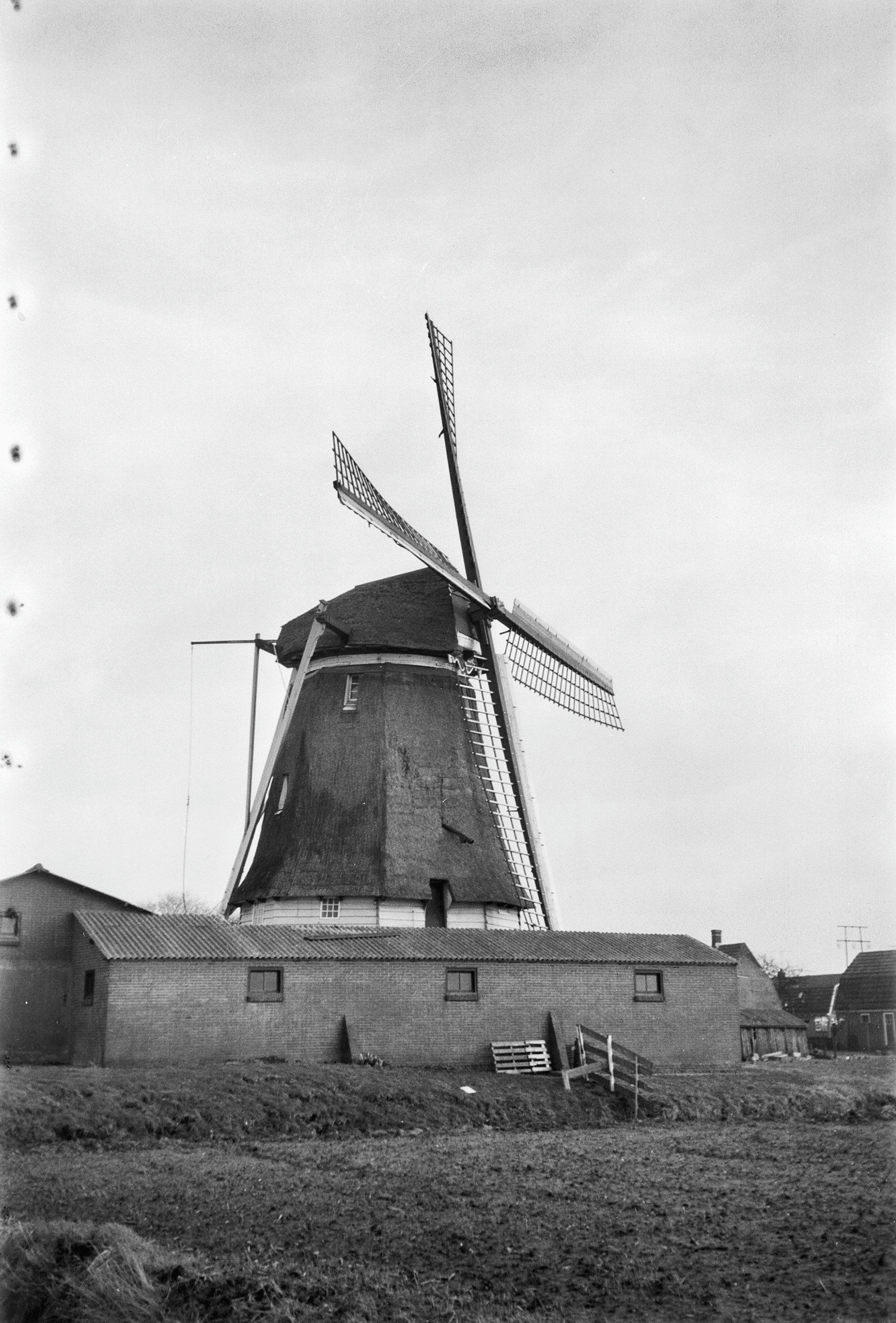
Ceres during restoration efforts (1962)

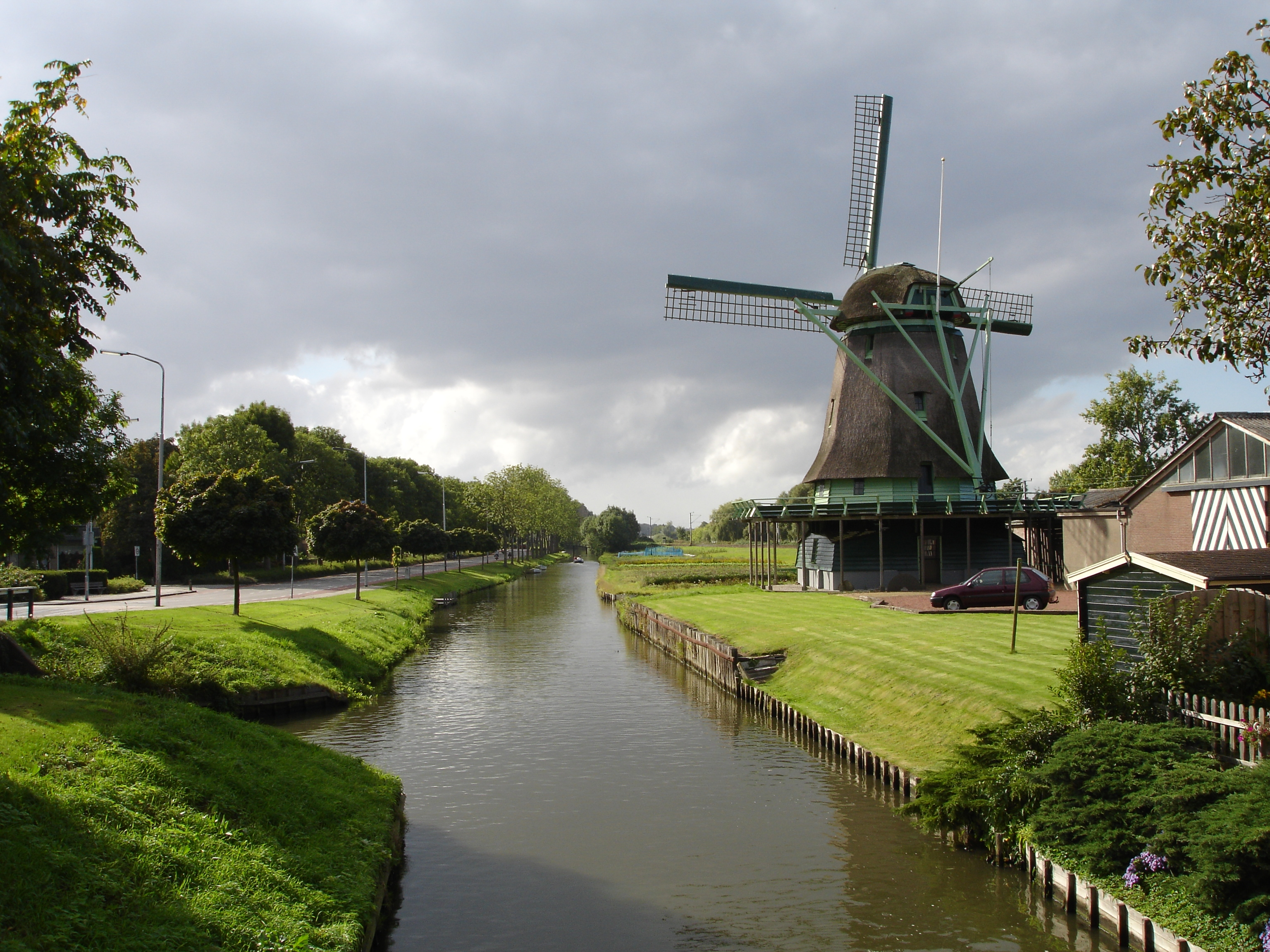
Ceres (2005)

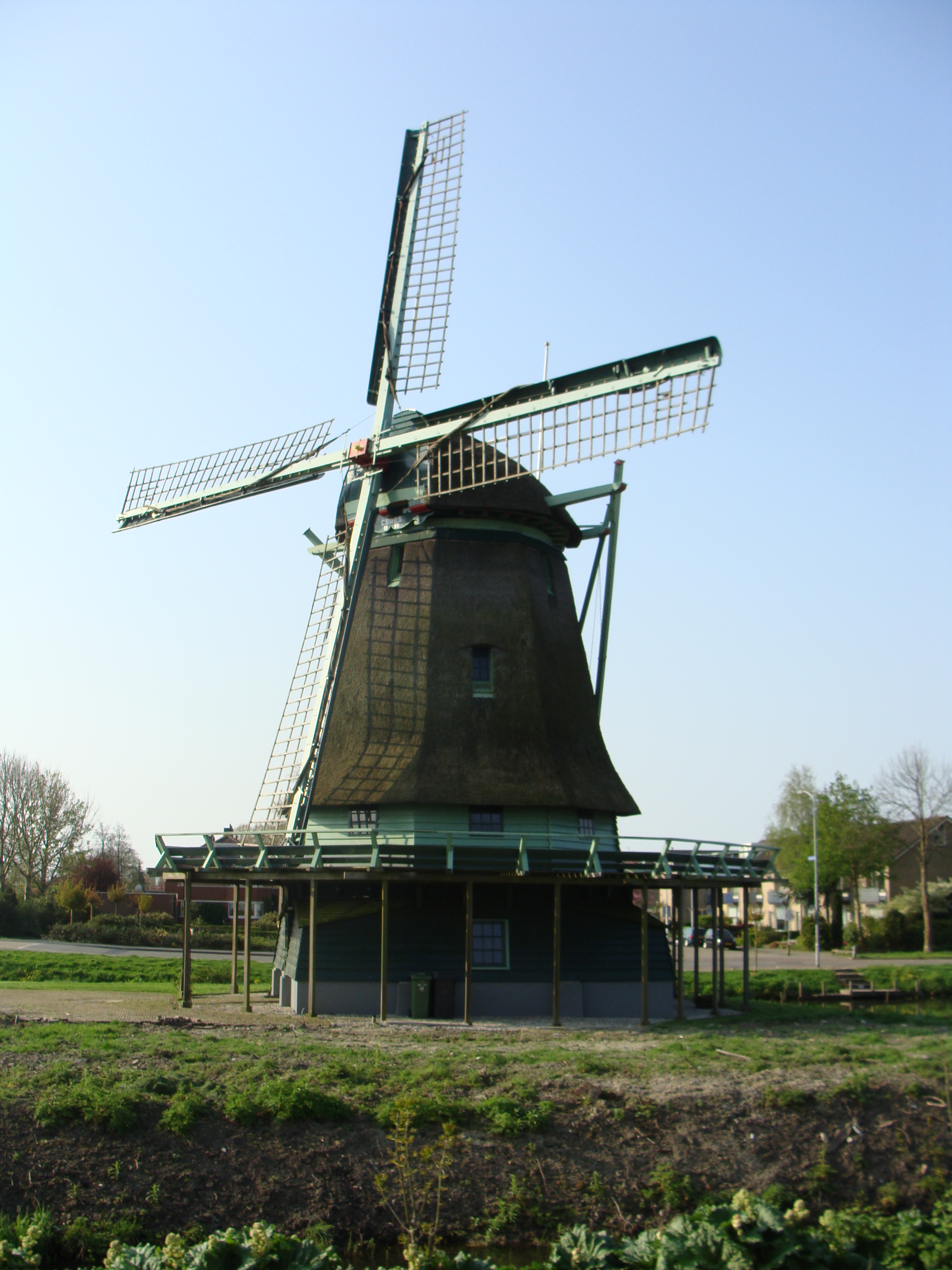
Ceres (2009)

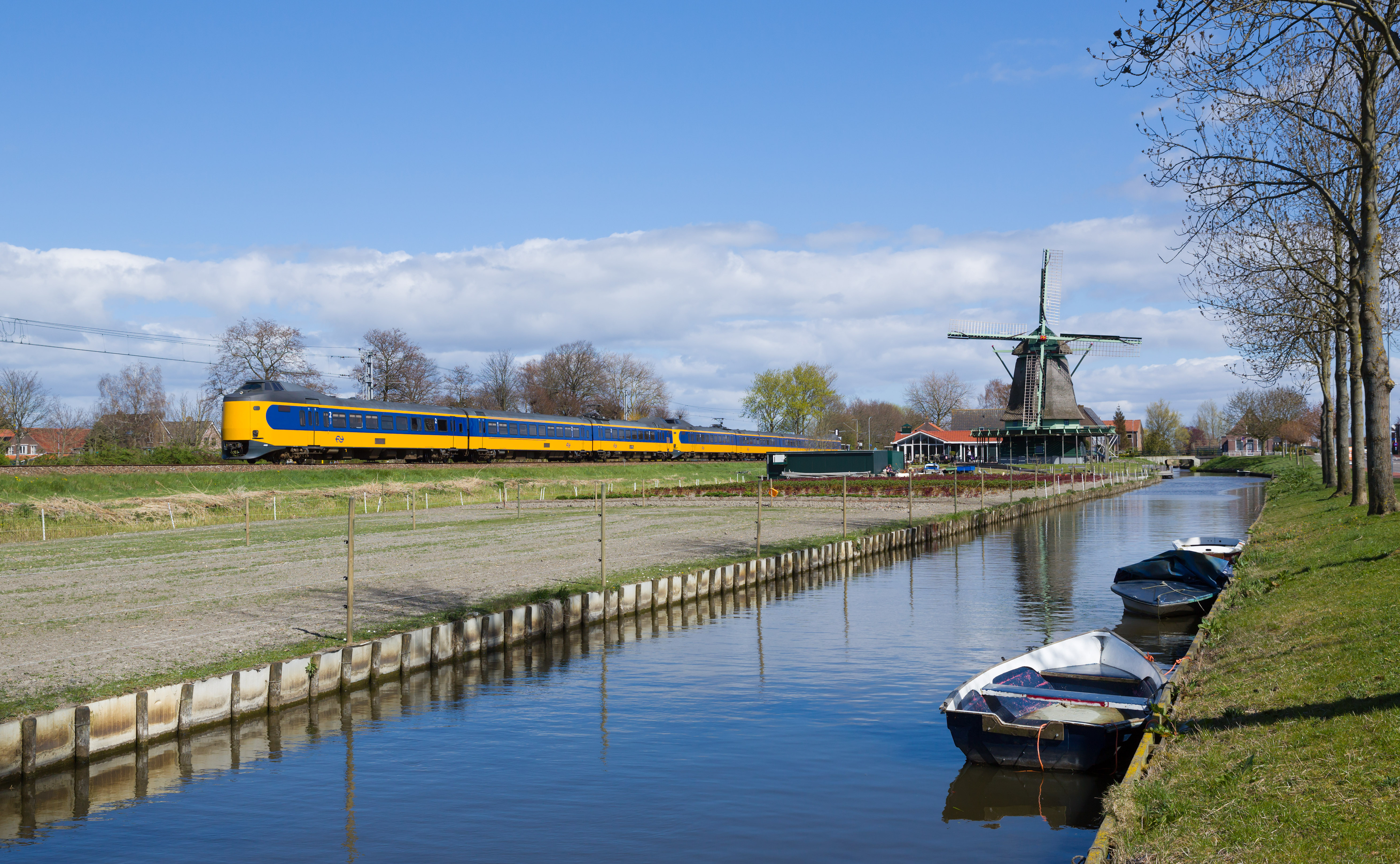
An NS Intercity passes the windmill due to its proximity to the Bovenkarspel Flora railway station (2015)

== See also ==
- De Gekroonde Poelenburg
- De Kat, Zaandam
