= Streekhof =

Coordinates: 52°41′49″N 5°14′3″E

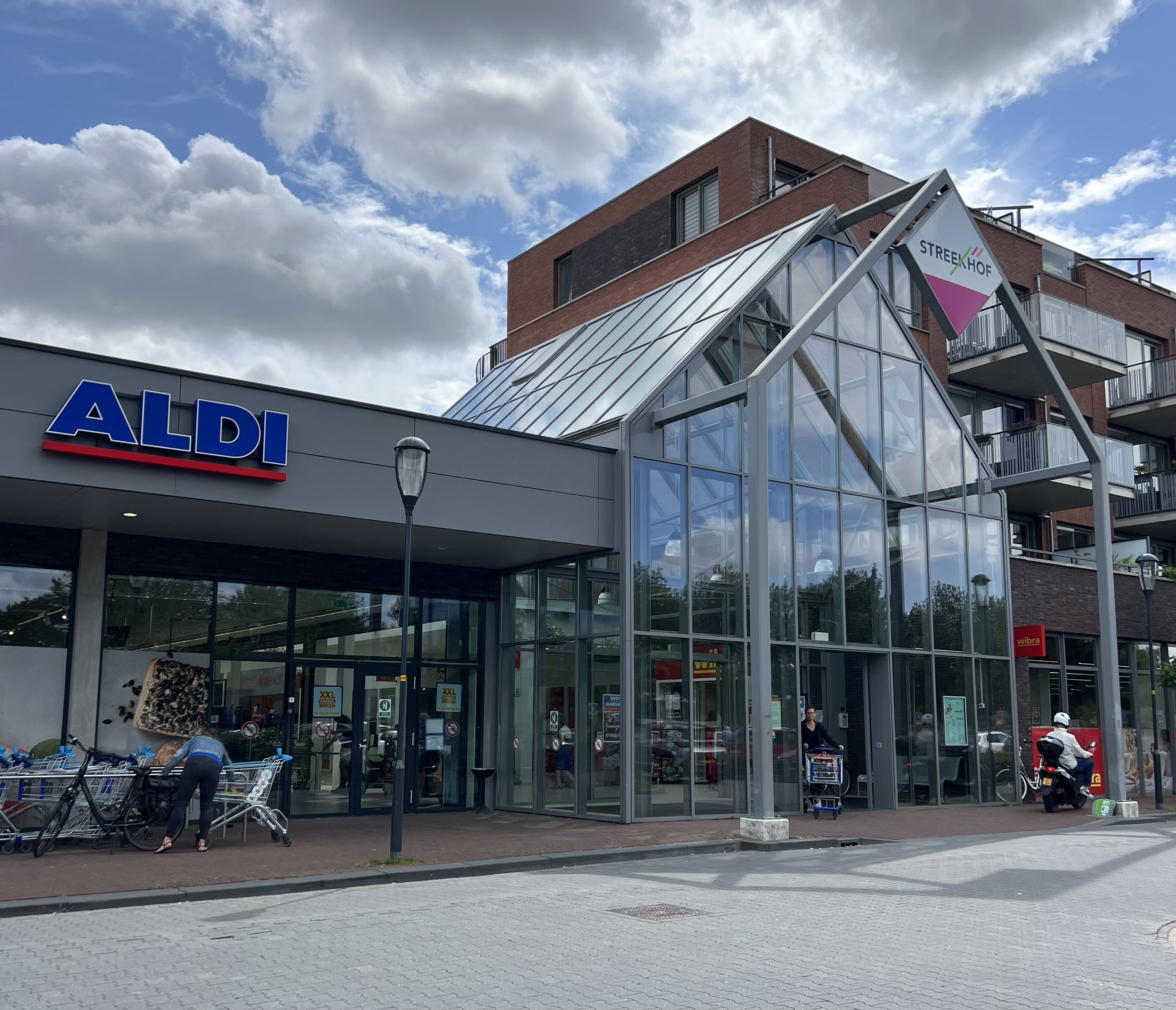
- Western entrance to the shopping centre
- Location: Stede Broec, Netherlands
- Address: De Middend 34-36, 1611 AA Bovenkarspel
- Opened: 19 March 1986
- Owner: Winkeliersvereniging Streekhof
- Num. of stores: ca. 60
- Website: https://www.streekhof.nl/

Streekhof is an indoor shopping centre located in Bovenkarspel, within the municipality of Stede Broec in the Dutch province of North Holland. It officially opened on 19 March 1986 and has since served as a regional shopping hub for the West-Friesland area.

== History ==
Development of the Streekhof began in the early 1980s. Existing buildings, including traditional farmhouses along the main street, were demolished to make room for the new shopping centre. Following years of planning and discussion, the centre was officially opened by Mayor J. Haanstra on 19 March 1986. Local entrepreneurs from Bovenkarspel and Grootebroek played a key role in the development of the first phase.

Due to its early success, the centre was expanded in multiple phases. A key aspect of the second phase was the reconfiguration of the old main street, which was split as a result of the shopping centre's construction. While there was initial resistance from residents, the changes were eventually implemented following community consultation. In 2002, the third phase was completed, adding a library and residential apartments.

As of 2025, Streekhof comprises approximately 60 shops, ranging from national retail chains to smaller specialised stores, such as delicatessen and liquor stores. It also includes various dining establishments. Every Thursday, a weekly market is held on the Streekplein square, adjacent to the shopping centre.

== Gallery ==
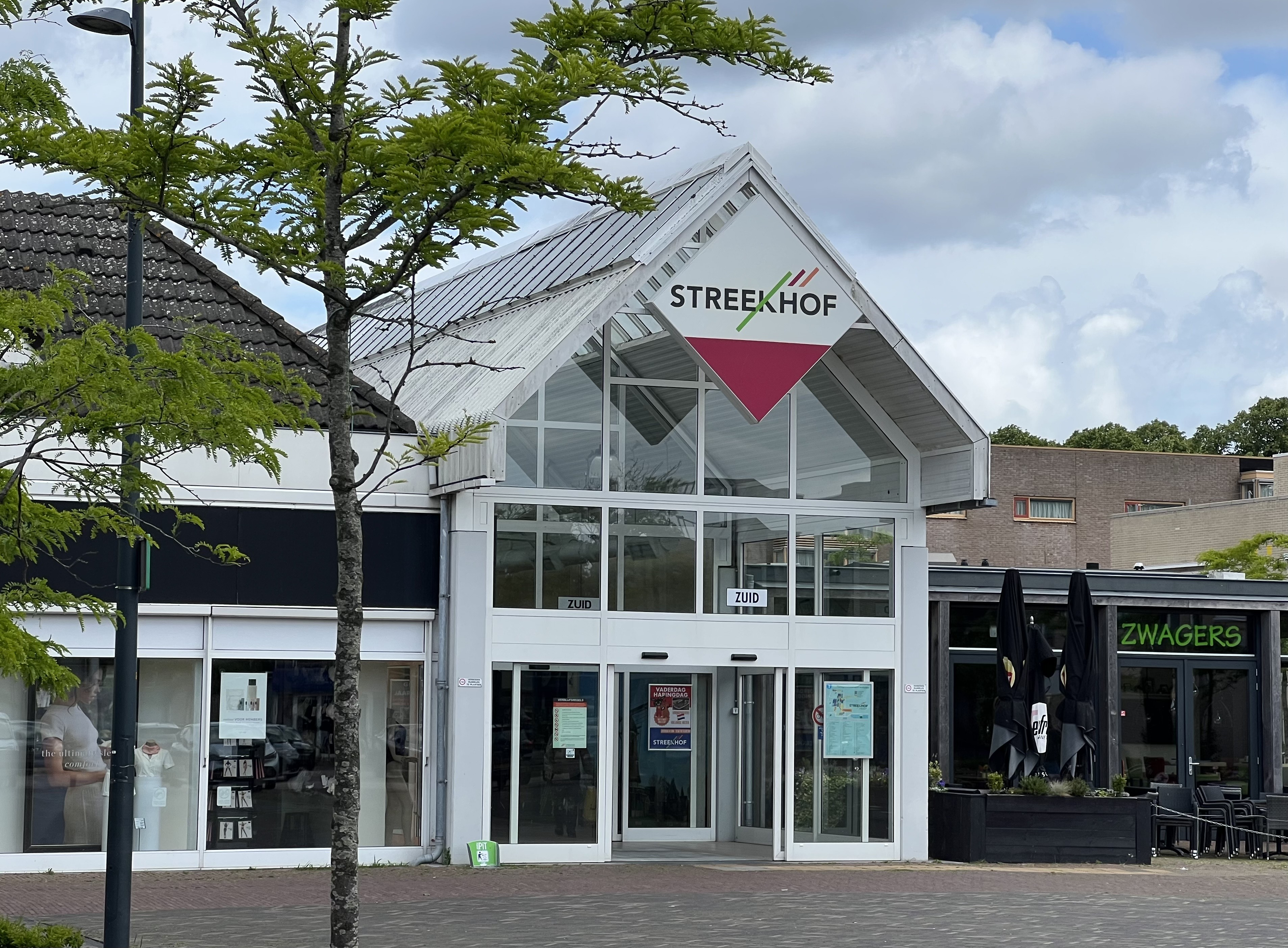

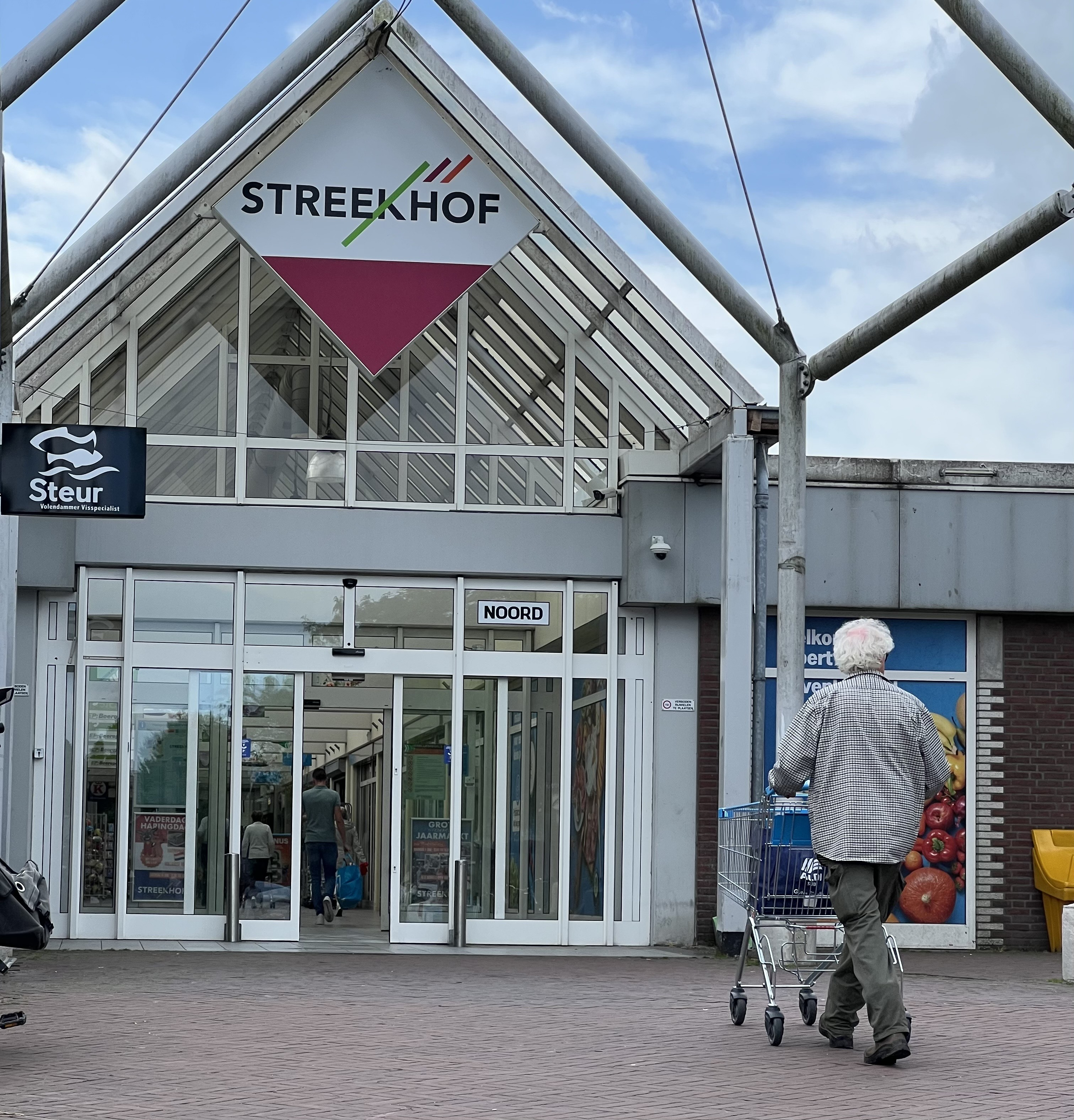
