= Broekerhaven =

Harbour in Stede Broec, Netherlands

Broekerhaven Broeckerhaven
- Neighbourhood and harbour
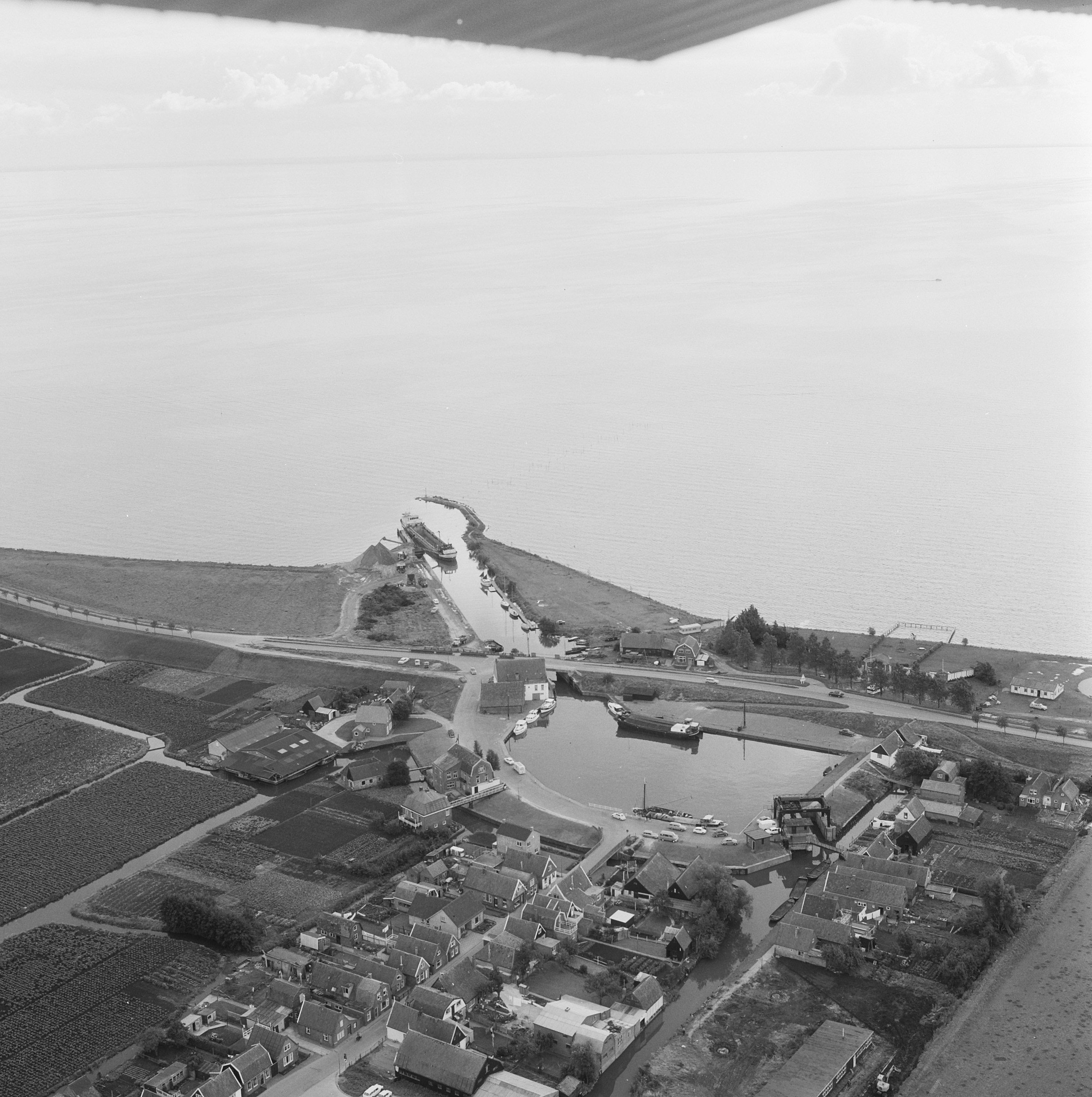
- Aerial photograph of Broekerhaven (1968)
- Interactive map of Broekerhaven
- Coordinates: 52°41′17″N 5°15′11″E
- Country: Netherlands
- Province: North Holland
- Municipality: Stede Broec
- Construction: 30 July 1449
- Named for: Harbour

Area
  - Total: 18 ha (44 acres)
  - Land: 16 ha (40 acres)
  - Water: 2 ha (4.9 acres)
- Highest elevation (dyke): 4 m (13 ft)
- Lowest elevation: −2 m (−6.6 ft)

Population (2025)
  - Total: 865
  - Density: 5,400/km^{2} (14,000/sq mi)
- Time zone: UTC+1 (CET)
  - Summer (DST): UTC+2 (CEST)
- Postcode: 1611
- Area code: 0228

Broekerhaven (Dutch pronunciation: [ˈbrukərˌhaːvən]) is a neighbourhood and harbour in the municipality of Stede Broec, in the province of North Holland, Netherlands. It is considered a neighbourhood of the town of Bovenkarspel, and sits on the northern shore of the Markermeer. Broekerhaven consists of an inner harbour ("de Kolk") and an outer harbour on the lake side.

== History ==
Broekerhaven was established in the 15th century as the harbour of the medieval jurisdiction (stede) of Grootebroek. In 1405, the rulers of stede Grootebroek, comprising the villages of Bovenkarspel, Grootebroek, Lutjebroek and Hoogkarspel, obtained permission by to create a harbour in the southern polder. The nearby city of Enkhuizen opposed this plan, fearing competition, causing the project was delayed for decades. Political turmoil during the Hook and Cod Wars (with stede Grootebroek supporting Jacqueline of Bavaria and Enkhuizen backing Philip of Burgundy) further complicated the construction. After the city rights of stede Grootebroek were restored in 1436, the harbour project was revived and approved. Construction began on 30 July 1449 when workers breached the Zuiderzee dyke, and the harbour was brought into use that year.

The new harbour allowed the people of stede Grootebroek (named Broekers) to share in maritime trade. By the late 16th century, Broekerhaven had grown into a bustling minor port. In 1574 a total of 59 ships from Broekerhaven passed through the Øresund on voyages to the Baltic Sea, which ranked the harbour third among Dutch ports for that year. Broekerhaven’s traders and skippers carried produce and goods via the Zuiderzee and further afield, generating considerable prosperity in the region.

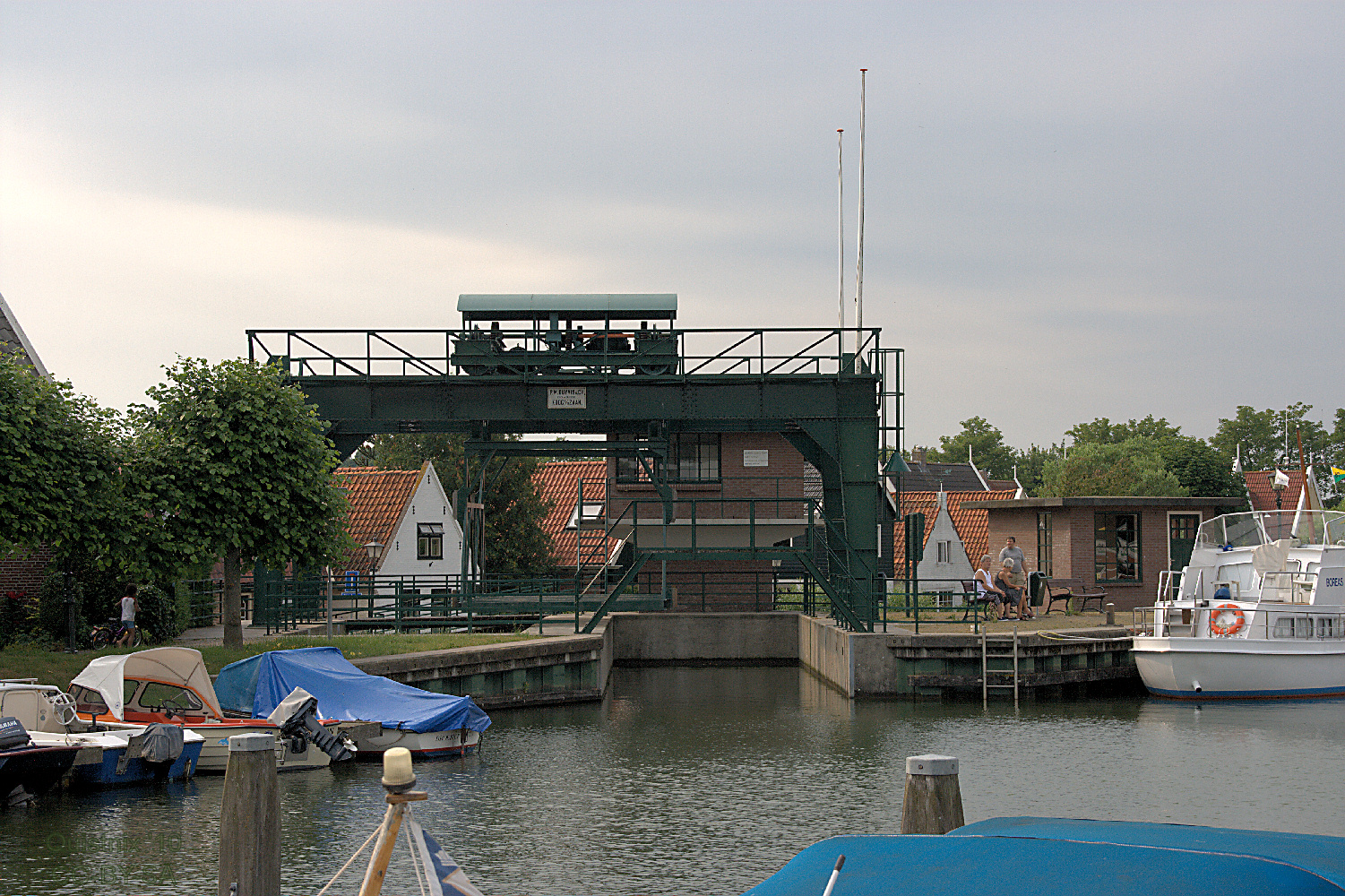
"Overhaal" boat lift

Because the polder land behind the dyke lay lower than the tidal Zuiderzee, a wooden overtoom (resembling a slipway) was installed to haul boats between the harbour and the inner polder waters. Originally this was done using a large wheel turned by manpower or horses, but following the Zuiderzee flood of 1916, the old overtoom was replaced by a modern boat lift in 1923-1924. The lift, called Overhaal, has electric motors to raise and lower vessels.

Over time, a small settlement grew around the harbour, receiving the same name. In 1807, during the establishment of municipalities, Broekerhaven was made part of the new municipality of Bovenkarspel, though Broekerhaven was still somewhat detached from the rest of the municipality amid surrounding fields. This changed in the late 20th century when the polder area between Bovenkarspel and Broekerhaven was urbanised, merging the two settlements. By that time, in 1979, the municipality of Bovenkarspel had been dissolved and merged into the larger municipality of Stede Broec.

== Geography ==
Broekerhaven is situated in the eastern part of the North Holland peninsula, on the northern shore of the Markermeer lake. It lies within the town of Bovenkarspel, in West Friesland, which is characterised predominantly by low-lying, flat polder landscapes. Broekerhaven lies below sea level. The only elevated area is the dyke that once bordered the Zuiderzee, which protects the land from flooding.

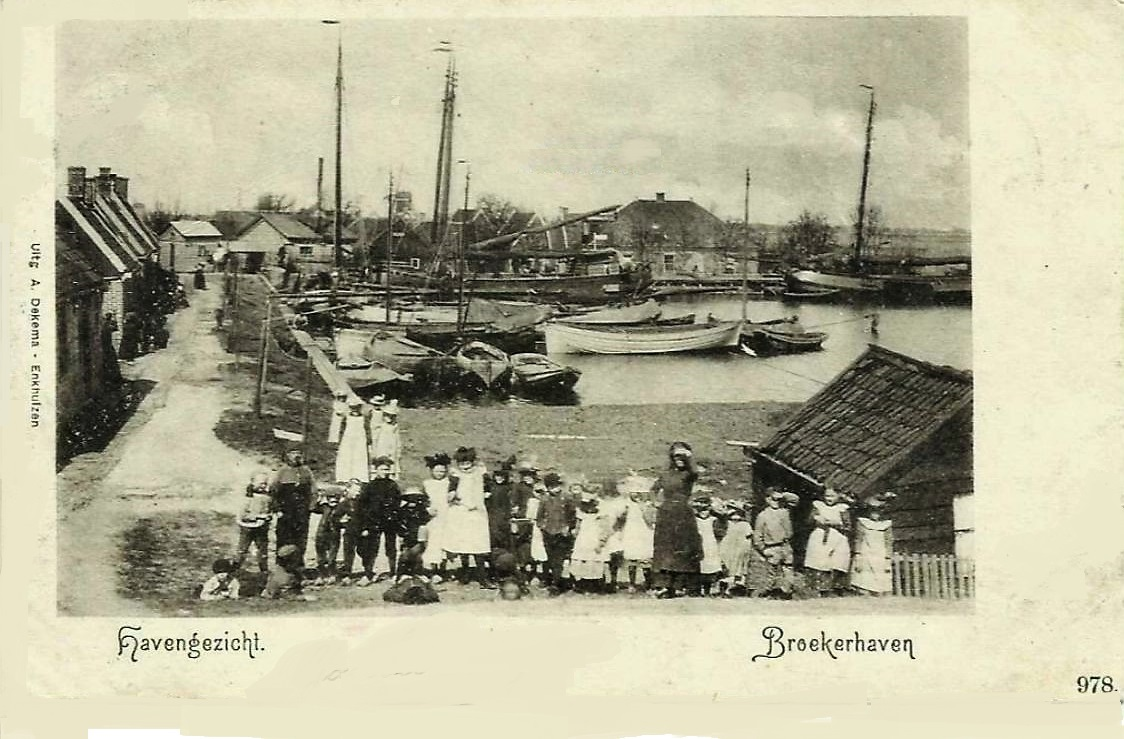
Inner "de Kolk" harbour (c. 1900)

Broekerhaven harbour consists of an inner harbour (''de Kolk'') and an outer harbour on the Markermeer, separated by the dyke. The harbour is connected to canals via the Overhaal. The surrounding landscape is part of the fertile Grootslag polder, used for horticulture and farming. A portion of Broekerhaven was altered during the construction and expansion of the N307 road, as some houses were demolished to make way for the modern route.

Administratively, Broekerhaven falls under the safety region Noord-Holland Noord and the jurisdiction of the Hollands Noorderkwartier water board.

== Culture ==
The annual Easter fair (kermis) of Bovenkarspel takes place in Broekerhaven.

=== Landmarks ===
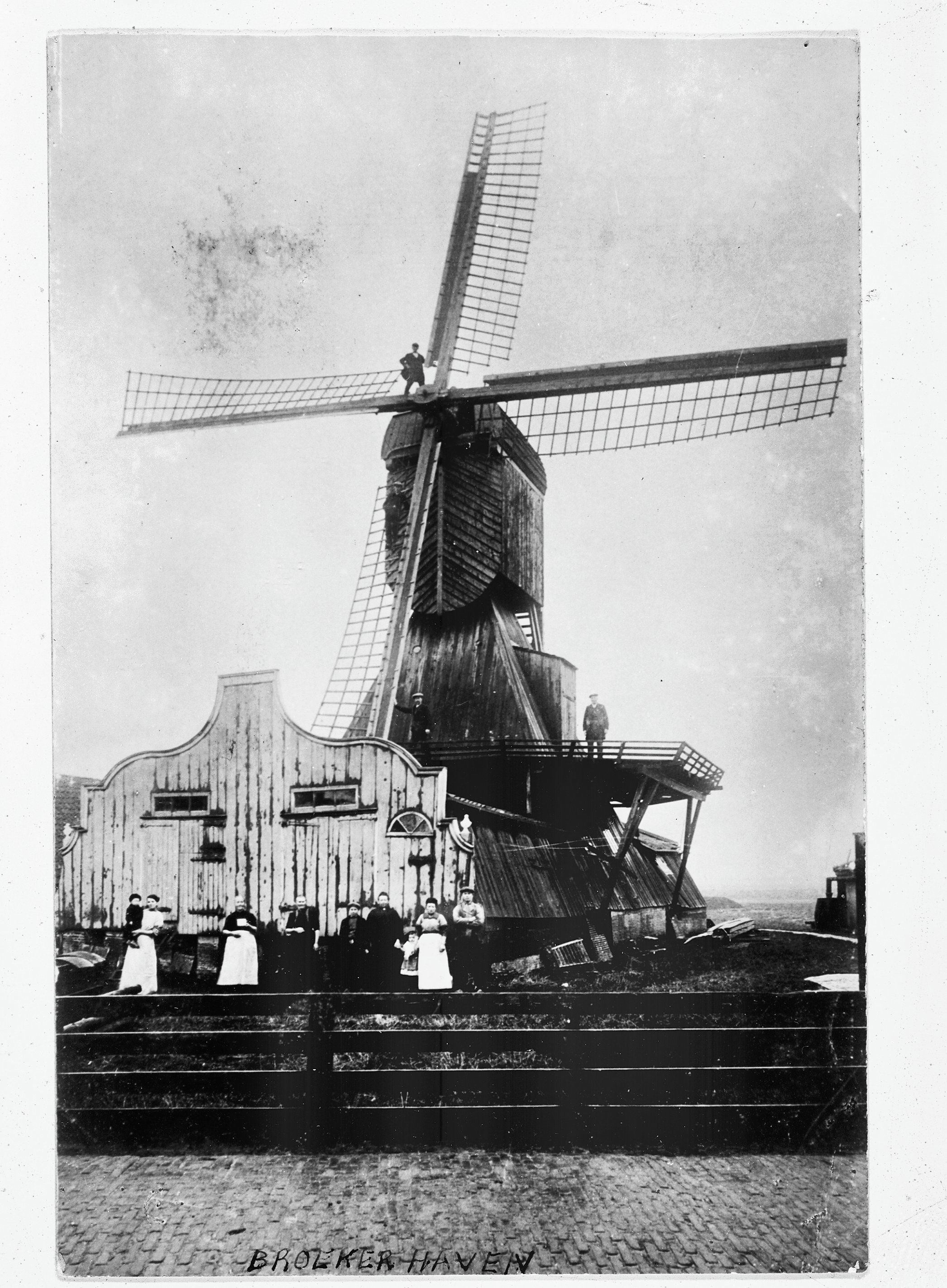
Wind-driven sawmill "De Eendracht", since dismantled.

Historically, Broekerhaven had a windmill: De Eendracht, a wind-driven sawmill. The smock mill, constructed in the late 17th century, was dismantled in 1916.

Near the harbour entrance, stands the former Grootslag II pumping station. Built in 1907 as a steam-powered polder drainage pump, it replaced several old windmills that had drained the polder. In 1989 the complex was designated a rijksmonument, just like the Overhaal boat lift.

Discussion around recognising the harbour as a protected heritage zone is ongoing.
