= Jan Stuifbergen =

Dutch politician (1929–2021)

Mayor of Heerhugowaard
- In office 1980–1994
- Preceded by: Albertus Franciscus Molleman
- Succeeded by: Evert Vermeer

Mayor of Stede Broec
- In office 1979–1980
- Preceded by: position established
- Succeeded by: Jan Haanstra

Mayor of Grootebroek
- In office 1967–1979
- Preceded by: Lodewijk Paul Hubertus Schepers
- Succeeded by: position abolished

Mayor of Bovenkarspel
- In office 1965–1979
- Preceded by: Jan Elders
- Succeeded by: position abolished

Personal details
- Born: 19 June 1929 Heiloo, Netherlands
- Died: 8 December 2021 (aged 92)
- Party: KVP; CDA

Jan Stuifbergen (19 June 1929 – 8 December 2021) was a Dutch politician.

A member of the Catholic People's Party and later the Christian Democratic Appeal, he served as mayor of Bovenkarspel from 1965 to 1979, mayor of Grootebroek from 1967 to 1979, mayor of Stede Broec from 1979 to 1980, and mayor of Heerhugowaard from 1980 to 1994. Stuifbergen died on 8 December 2021, at the age of 92.
