= Stede Broec =

- Municipality
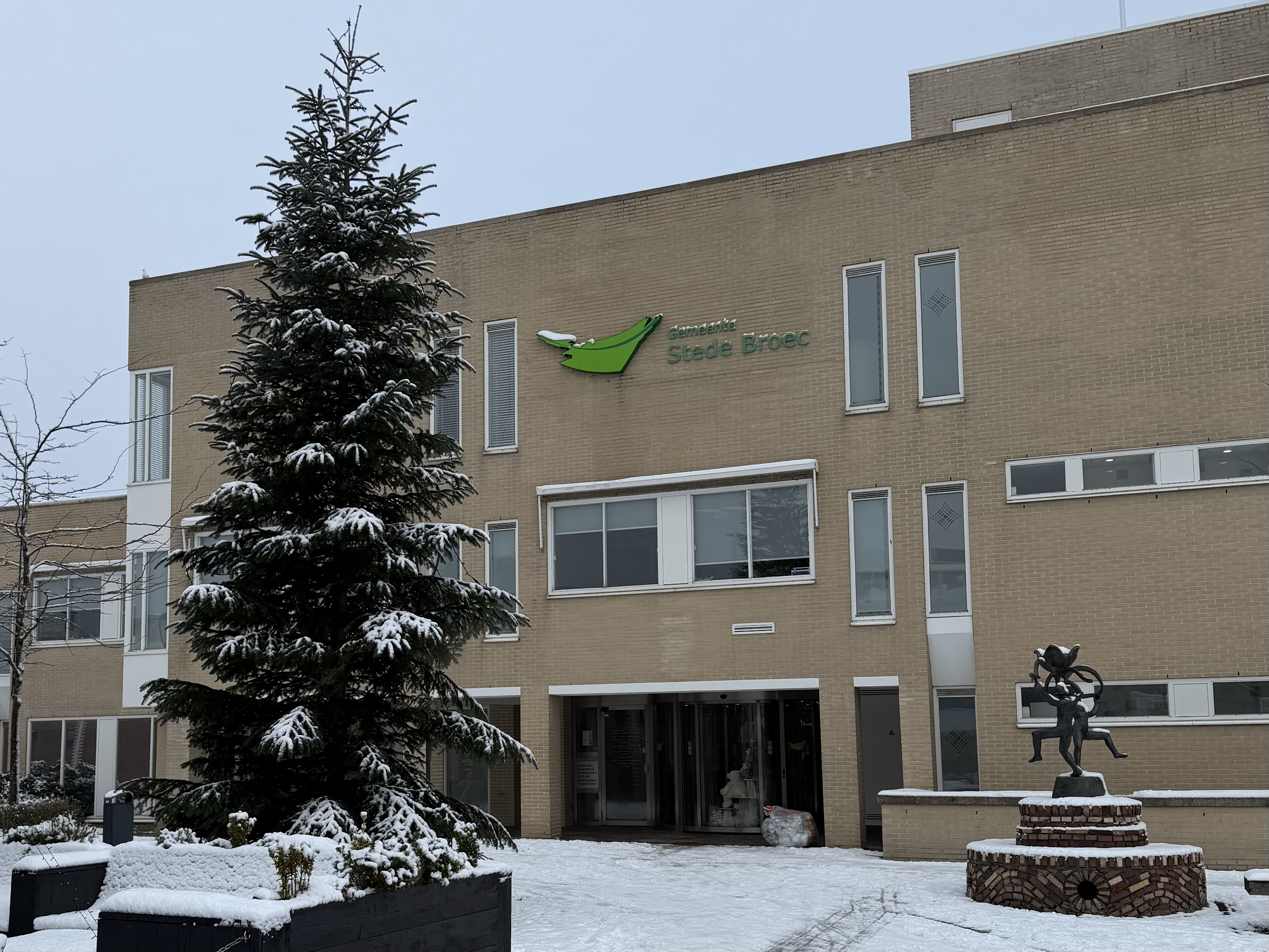
- Town hall of Stede Broec

- Flag Coat of arms

- Location in North Holland
- Coordinates: 52°42′N 5°14′E
- Country: Netherlands
- Province: North Holland
- Region: West Friesland
- Established: 1 January 1979
- Named for: Medieval name
- Subdivisions: Bovenkarspel (including Broekerhaven), Grootebroek, Lutjebroek

Government
  - Body: Municipal council
  - Mayor: Ronald Wortelboer (VVD)

Area
  - Total: 16.37 km^{2} (6.32 sq mi)
  - Land: 14.50 km^{2} (5.60 sq mi)
  - Water: 1.87 km^{2} (0.72 sq mi)
- Elevation: −1 m (−3.3 ft)

Population (2025)
  - Total: 22,253
  - Density: 1,500/km^{2} (3,900/sq mi)
- Time zone: UTC+1 (CET)
  - Summer (DST): UTC+2 (CEST)
- Postcode: 1610–1614
- Area code: 0228
- Website: www.stedebroec.nl

Stede Broec (Dutch: [ˌsteːdə ˈbruk]; West Frisian Dutch: Stee Broek) is a municipality in the Netherlands, in the province of North Holland and the region of West Friesland.

The municipality was established in 1979 through the merger of two former municipalities. Stede Broec encompasses three large settlements, Bovenkarspel, Grootebroek, and Lutjebroek, as well as the hamlets of Broekerhaven and Horn.

== Etymology ==
The name Stede Broec derives from the Middle Dutch words 'stede' (meaning a place or city) and 'broec' or 'broek' (meaning swamp or marshland). The term broek is common in Dutch toponyms and reflects the peatland that characterised the area historically.

During the establishment of the municipality, the name Stede Broec was chosen as a nod to the stede Grootebroek union in the Middle Ages. In the West-Frisian dialect the name is pronounced as Stee Broek.

== History ==
Grootebroek and Bovenkarspel received city rights in 1364 together, under the name of 'Broek'. In 1402, Lutjebroek shared in the city rights and Hoogkarspel joined in 1403. Andijk was the fifth to join in 1786. In 1825 the city was dissociated.

== Geography ==
Stede Broec is located in the eastern part of the North Holland peninsula, on the northern shore of the Markermeer lake. It lies within the West Friesland region, characterised predominantly by low-lying, flat polder landscapes. The only elevated areas are the dykes, such as the Westfriese Omringdijk, which protect the land from flooding. Administratively, Stede Broec falls under the safety region Noord-Holland Noord and the jurisdiction of the Hollands Noorderkwartier water board.

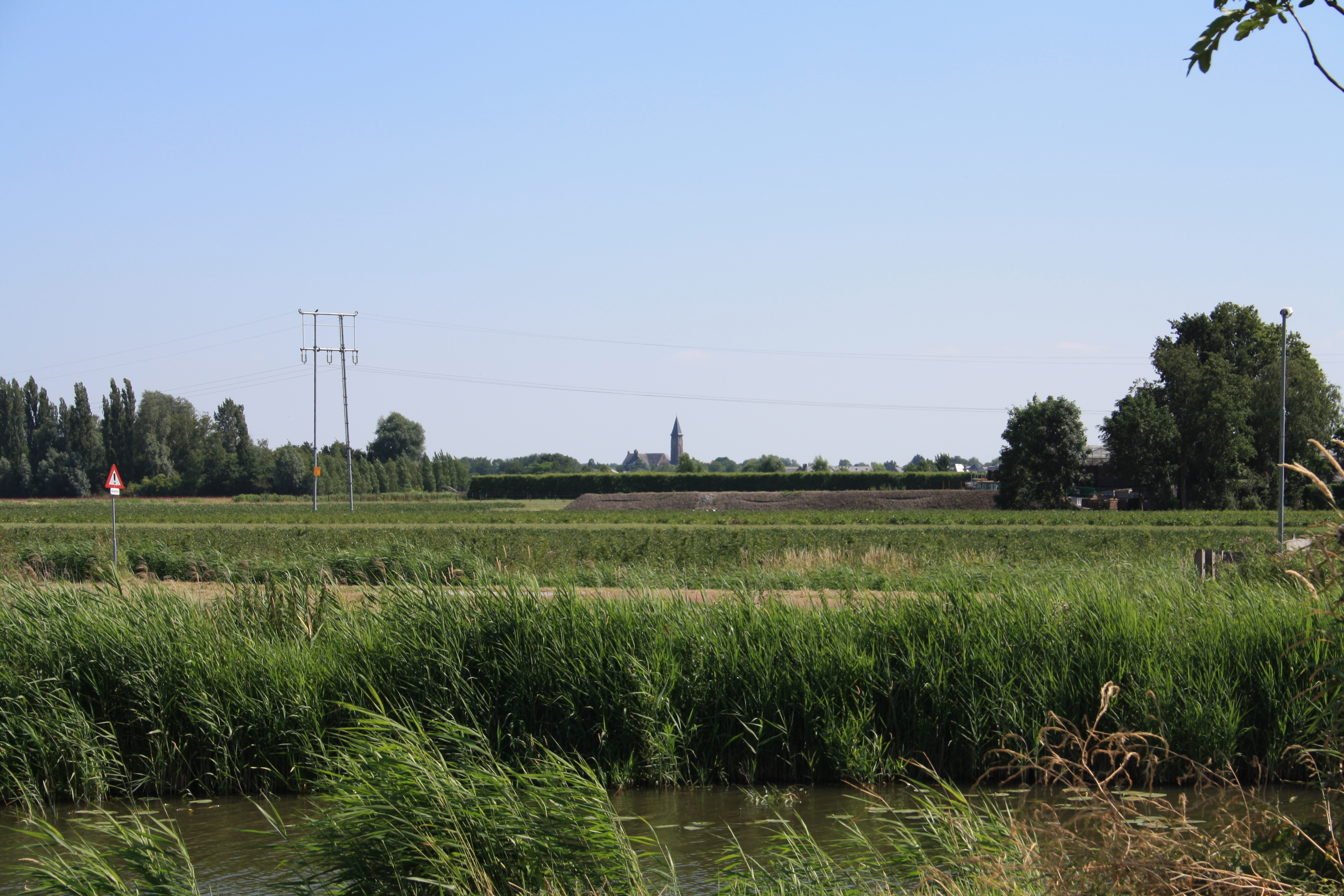
View of Grootebroek from the nearby polder.

The municipality is intersected by waterways and canals that have historically supported transport and irrigation. Its proximity to the Markermeer and the larger IJsselmeer lakes has influenced both the local climate and economic activities. The fertile soil of the region supports extensive agriculture, especially the cultivation of vegetables and flower bulbs.

Natural areas nearby, including Het Streekbos and surrounding polders, provide recreational spaces and function as green buffers that separate urban areas.

=== Climate ===
Stede Broec has an oceanic climate (Köppen: Cfb) strongly influenced by its proximity to the North Sea to the west, with prevailing westerly winds.

Summers are moderately warm with average daily highs from June to August ranging between 19–21 °C (66–70 °F). Temperatures of 30 °C (86 °F) or higher occur on average 1.8 days per year (2009–2018), placing Stede Broec in AHS heat zone 2. The town receives the most sunshine during late spring and early summer. Winters are mild, with average high temperatures in January typically around 5 °C (41 °F). Snowfall occurs occasionally, with a few snowy days each year. Stede Broec, like much of North Holland, lies in USDA hardiness zone 8b. Frosts mainly occur during spells of easterly or northeasterly winds from continental Europe, but due to surrounding bodies of water, nighttime temperatures rarely fall far below 0 °C (32 °F).

Precipitation is relatively evenly distributed throughout the year, with annual totals between 800 and 900 millimeters (31 to 35 inches). The wettest months are August and October, while January and February tend to be the driest. Average wind speeds range from 3 and 4 on the Beaufort scale, with stronger winds occurring in autumn and winter.

=== Topography ===
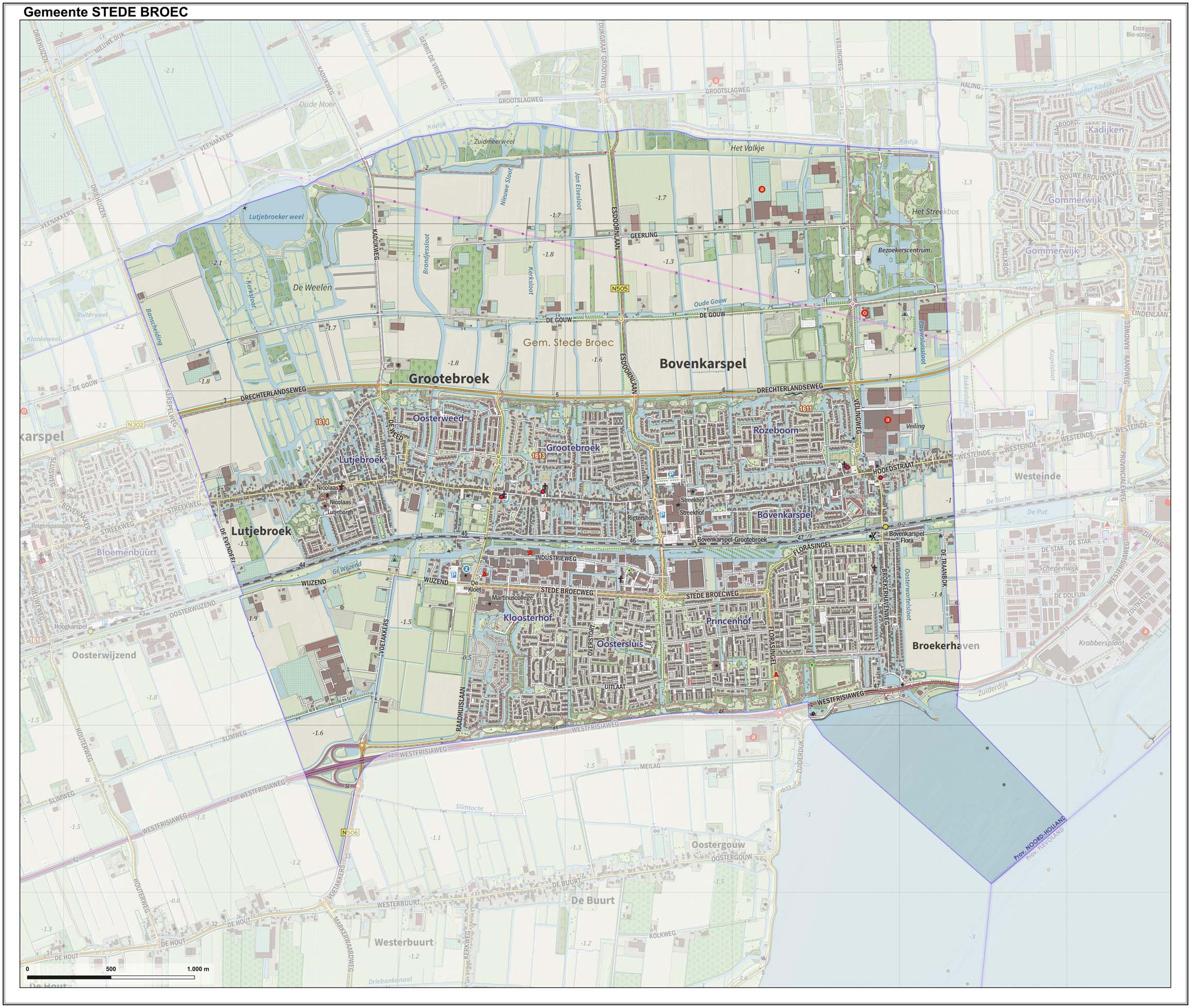
Map of the municipality of Stede Broec, 2024

== Demography ==
=== Population centers ===
The municipality of Stede Broec consists of the following cities, towns, villages and/or districts:

- Bovenkarspel
- Grootebroek
- Lutjebroek
- Broekerhaven
- Horn

== Politics ==
The municipal council of Stede Broec consists of 19 seats, which at the 2026 municipal elections divided as follows:

- Rechts Stede Broec - 6 seats
- Open en Duidelijk Stede Broec - 5 seats
- CDA - 3 seats
- VVD - 3 seats
- PvdA/GroenLinks - 1 seat
- Stem van Stede Broec - 1 seat

== Notable people ==
- Pieter Straat (ca. 1670-1752), poet, mayor, and water board official
- Jan Elders (1900-1992), mayor
- Johannes Willebrands (1906-2006), Catholic cardinal
- Henk Bosma (1915-2002), politician
- Trudy van den Berg (born 1947), singer of Saskia & Serge
- Gerard Visser (born 1950), philosopher
- Ed Groot (born 1957), politician, journalist, columnist, and civil servant
- Ria Brieffies (1957-2009), singer of Dolly Dots
- Cor Dekker (born 1987), darts player
- Nina Buysman (born 1997), racing cyclist

== Gallery ==
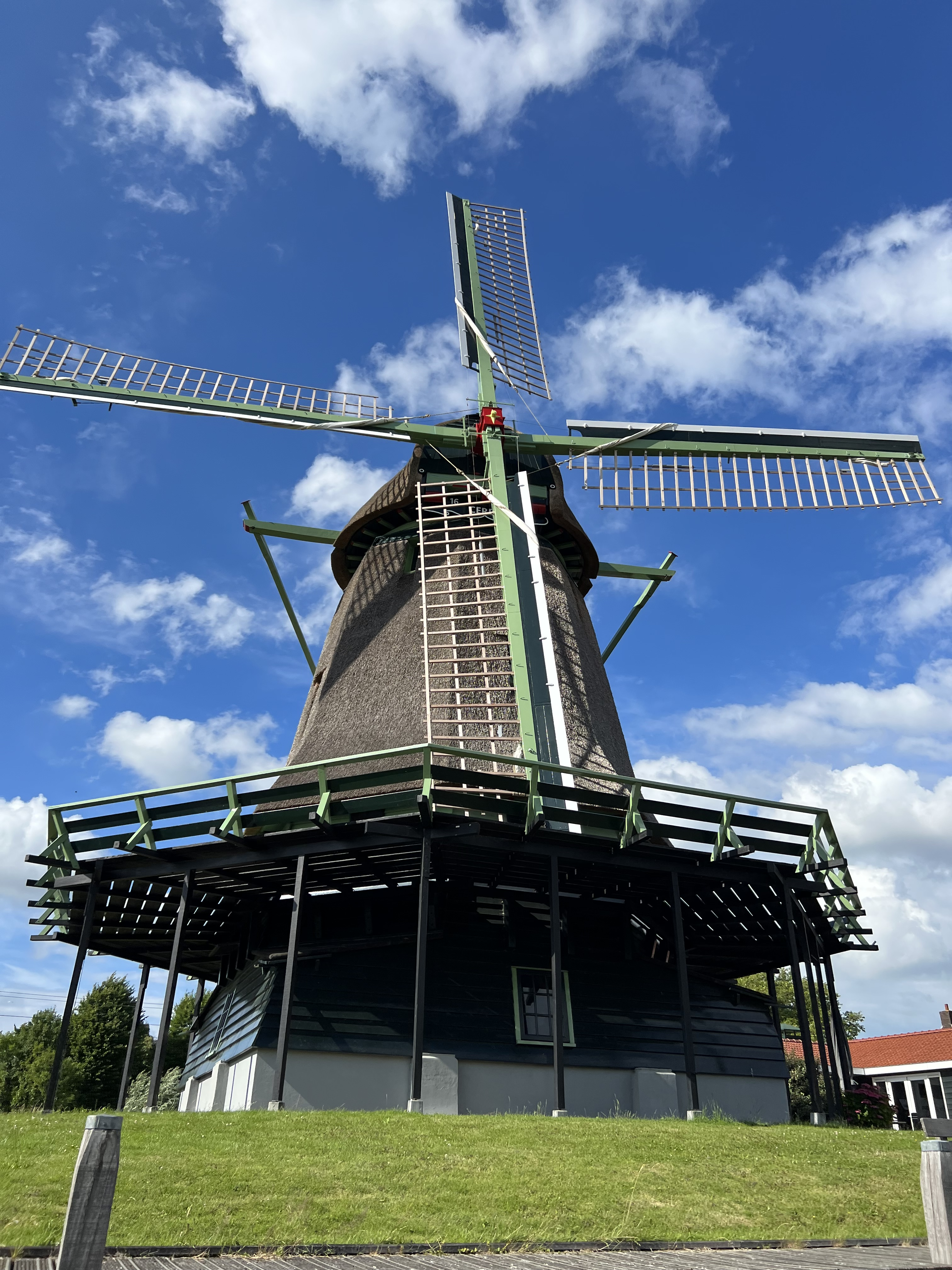
Ceres windmill, Bovenkarspel

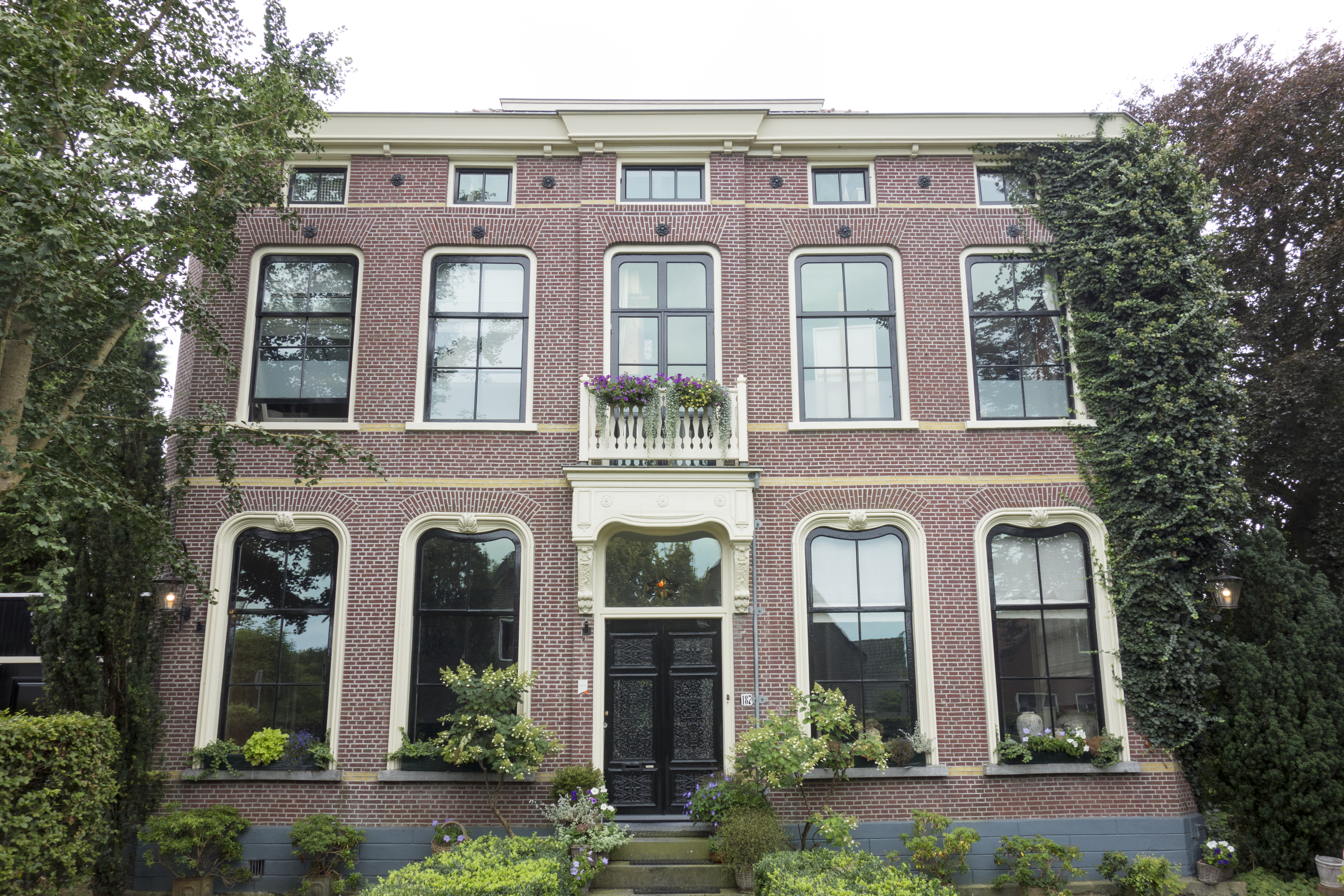
Zesstedenweg, Grootebroek

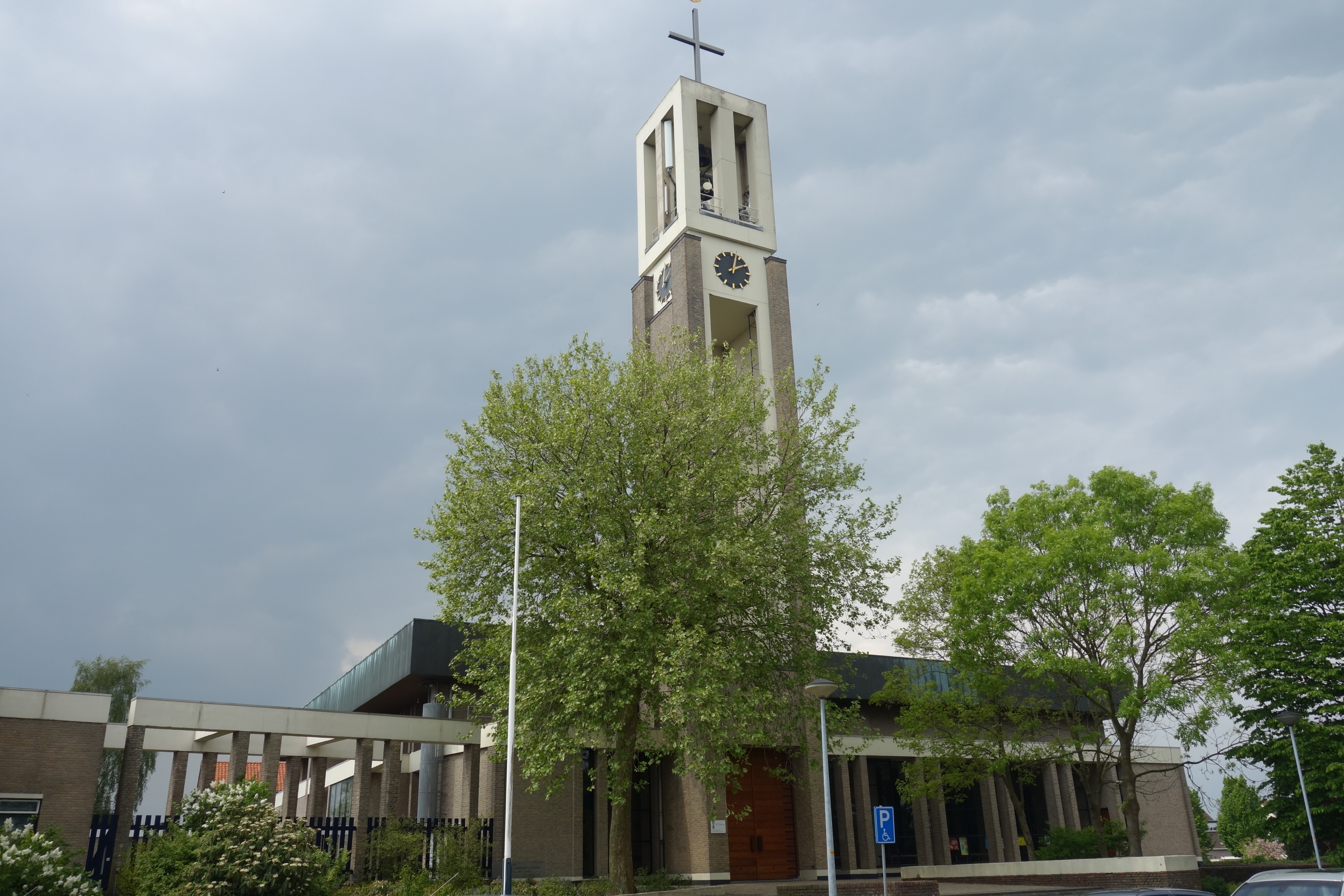
Saint Martin's Parish, Bovenkarspel

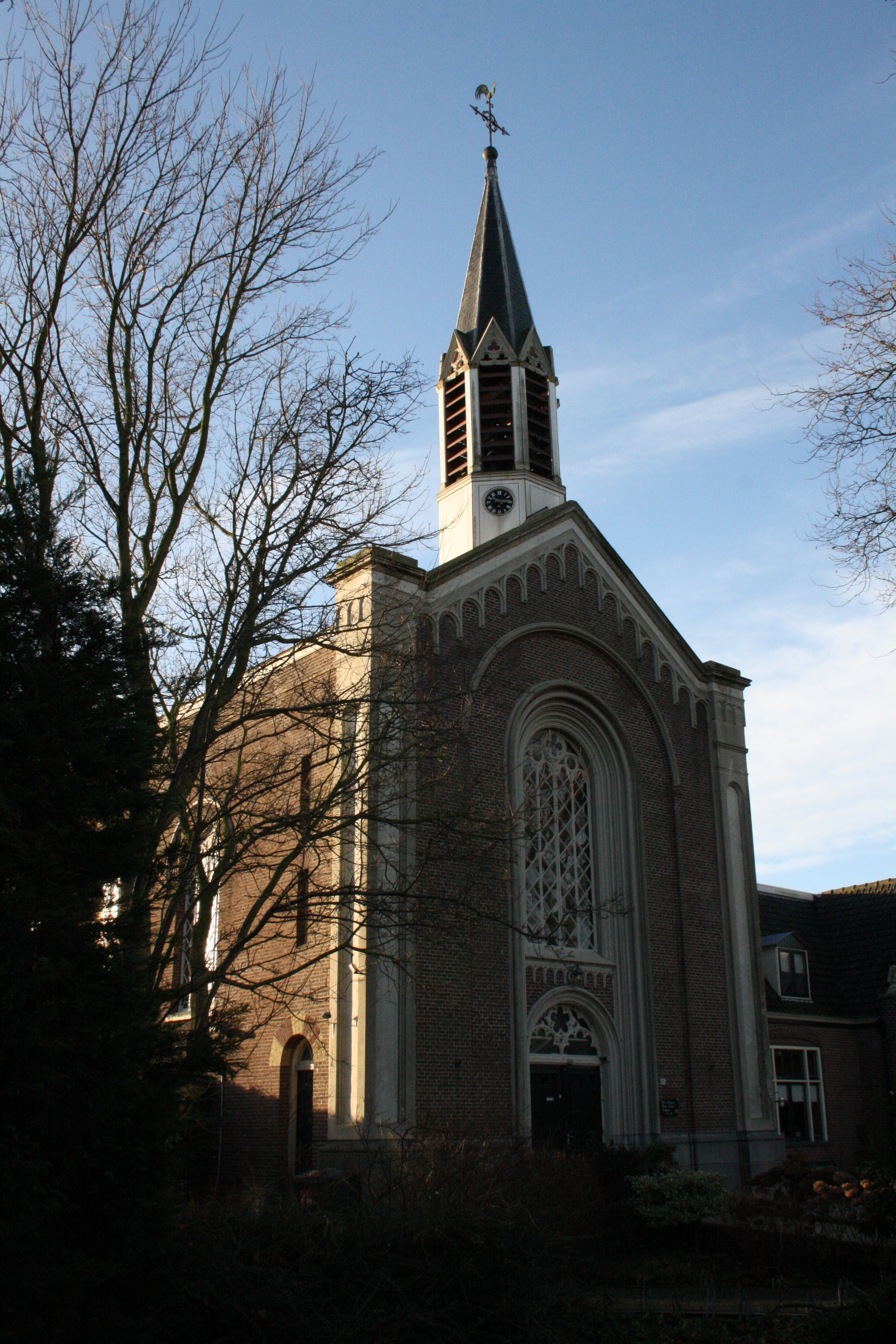
Dutch Reformed Church, Lutjebroek

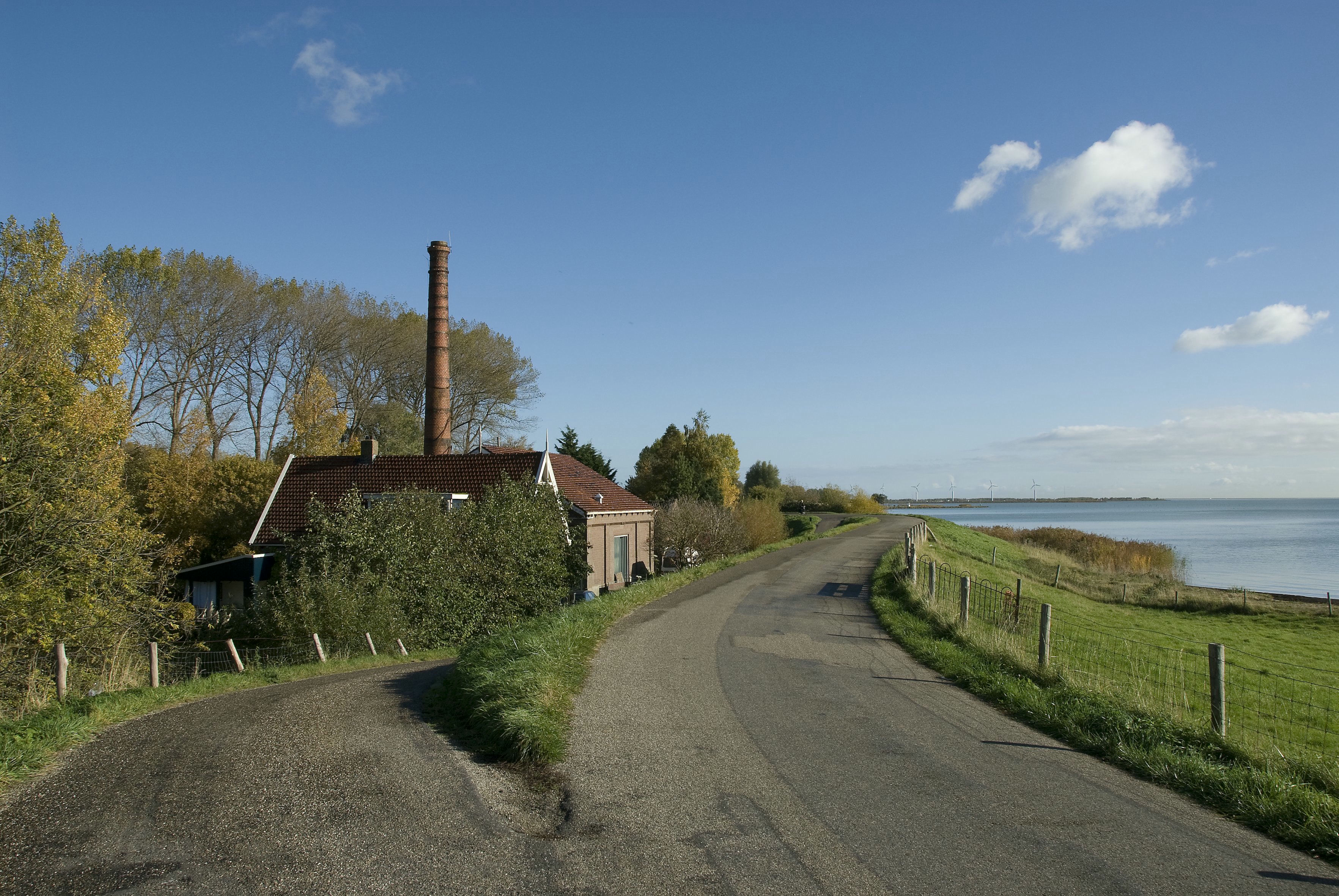
Levee, Broekerhaven

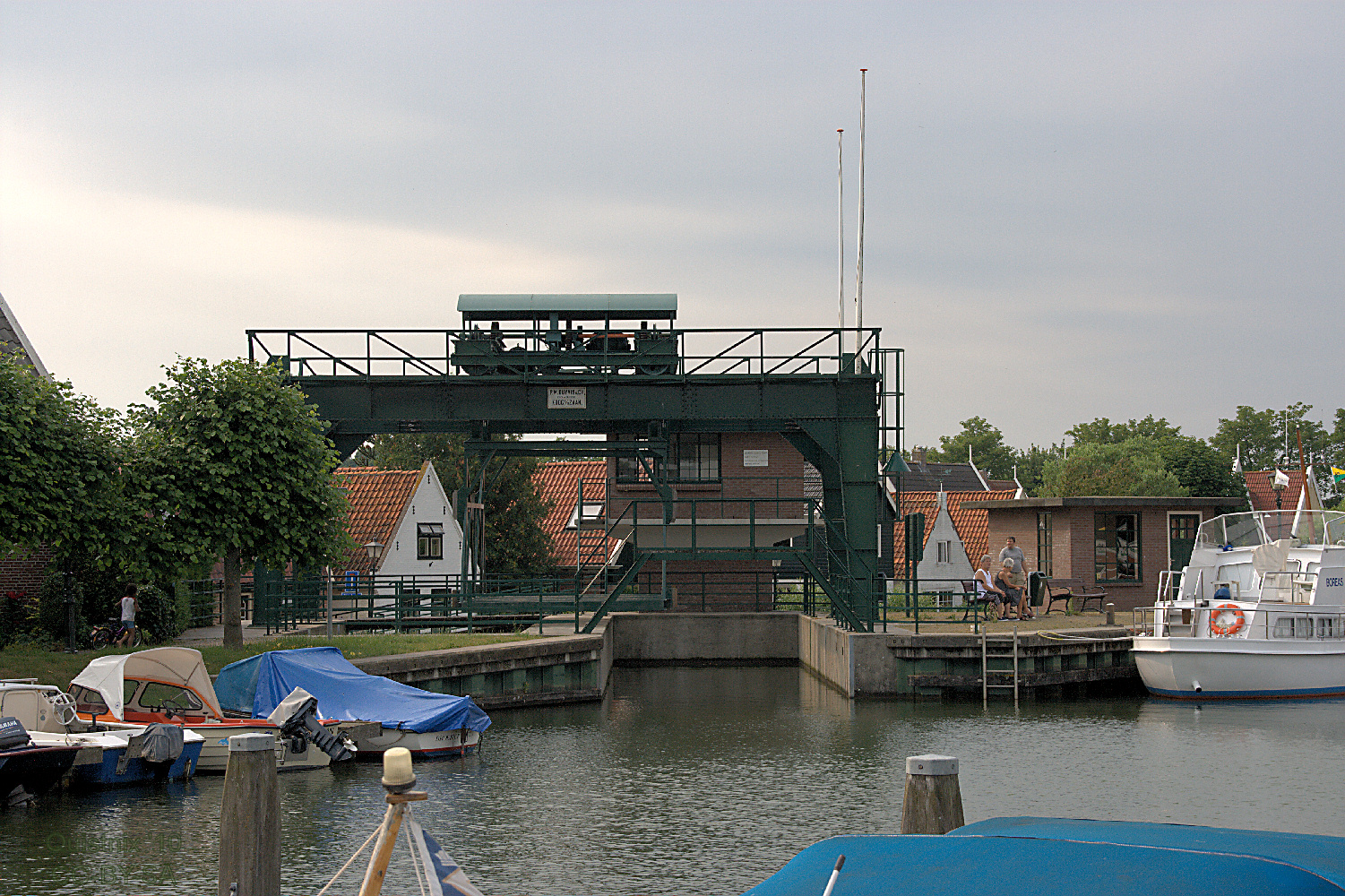
Harbour, Broekerhaven

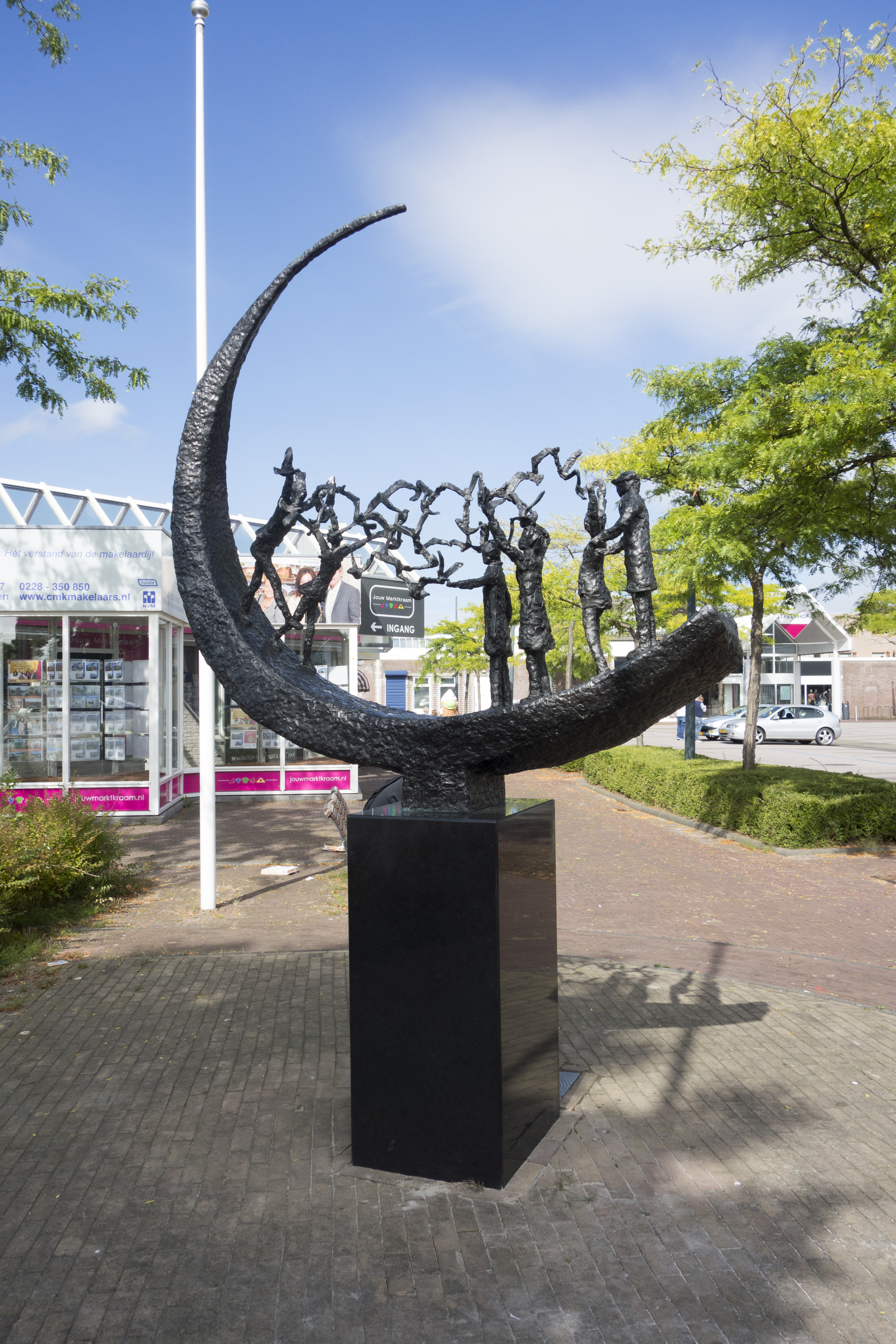
Liberation Monument, Stede Broec

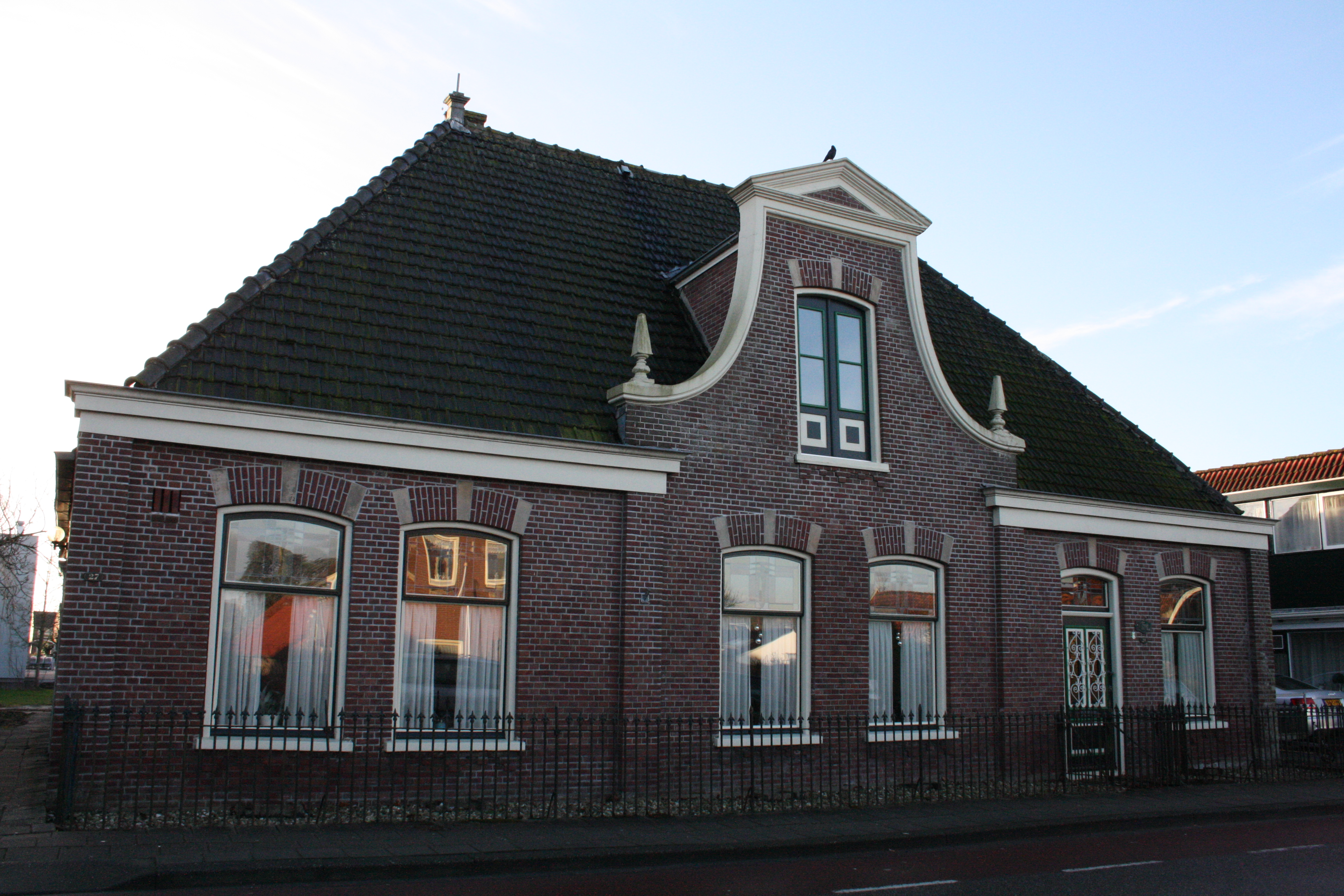
P.J. Jongstraat, Lutjebroek

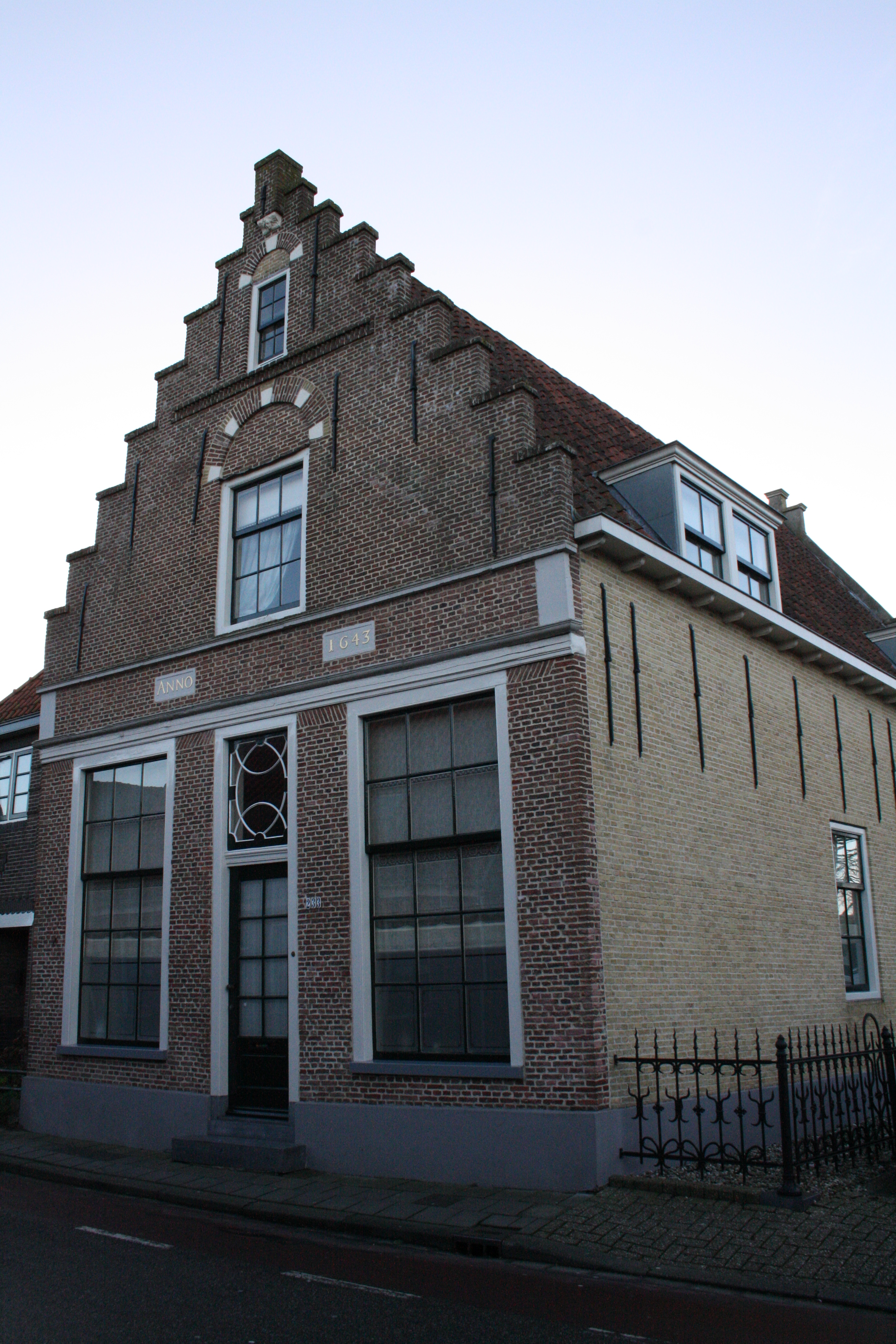
Stepped gable, Grootebroek

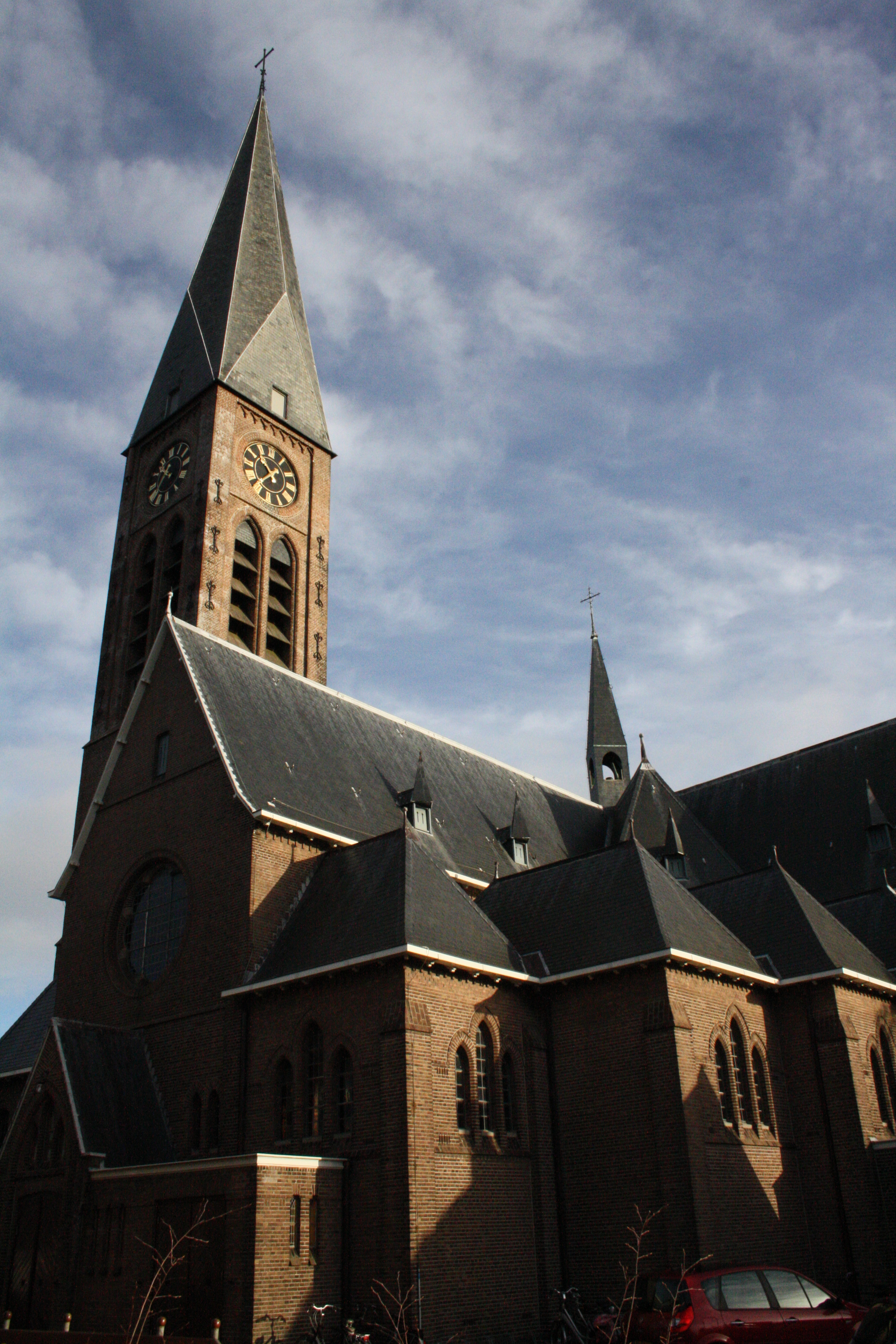
Sint-Nicolaaskerk, Lutjebroek
