= Ed Groot =

Dutch politician, journalist, columnist and civil servant (born 1957)

Vincentius Aloysius (Ed) Groot
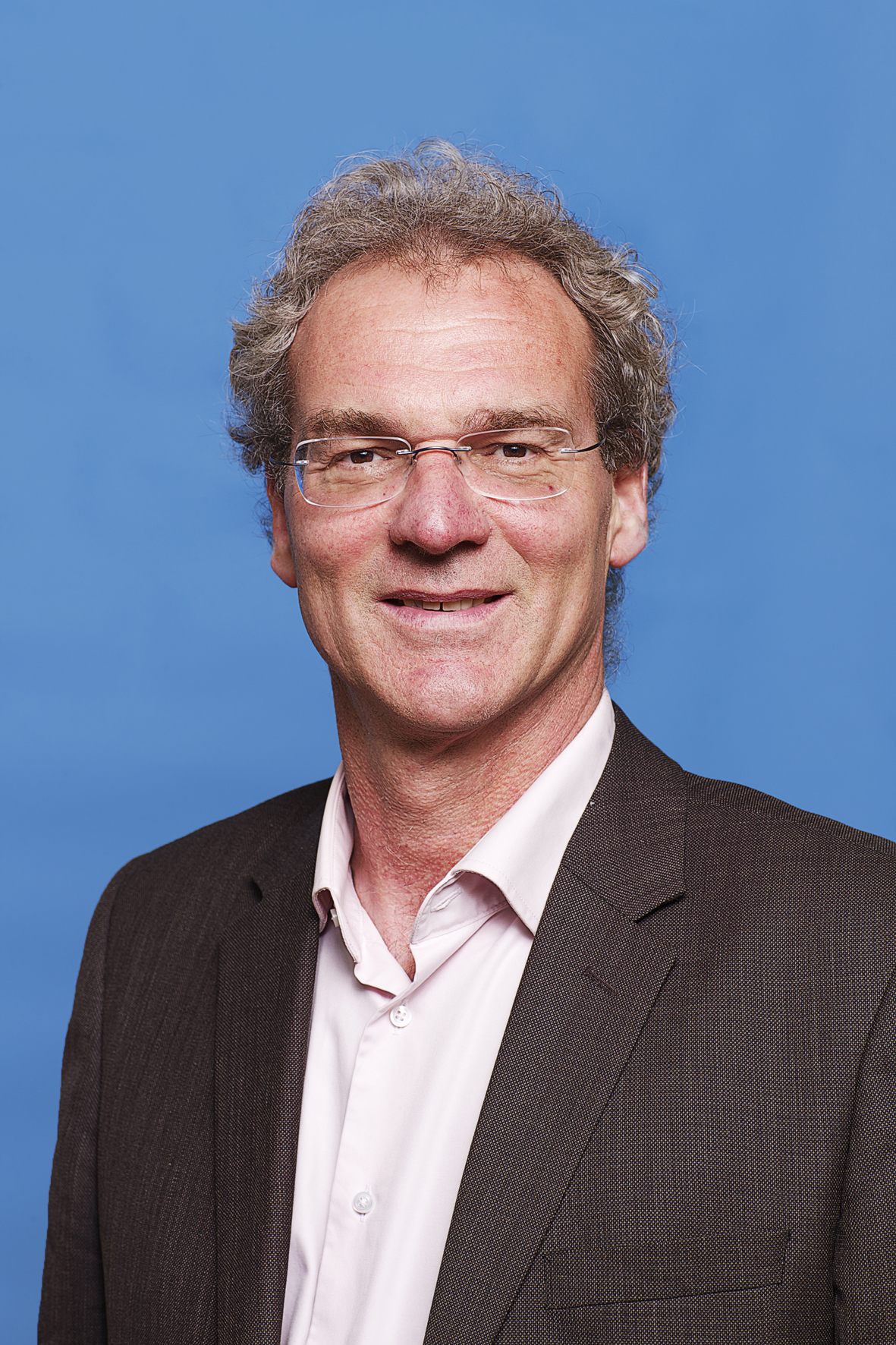

Member of the House of Representatives
- In office 17 June 2010 – 23 March 2017

Personal details
- Born: 26 December 1957 (age 68) Grootebroek, Netherlands

Vincentius Aloysius (Ed) Groot (born 26 December 1957) is a Dutch politician and former journalist, columnist and civil servant. As a member of the Labour Party (Partij van de Arbeid) he was an MP between 17 June 2010 and 23 March 2017. He focused on matters of taxes, government spending and finances.
