= Lutjebroek =

- Village
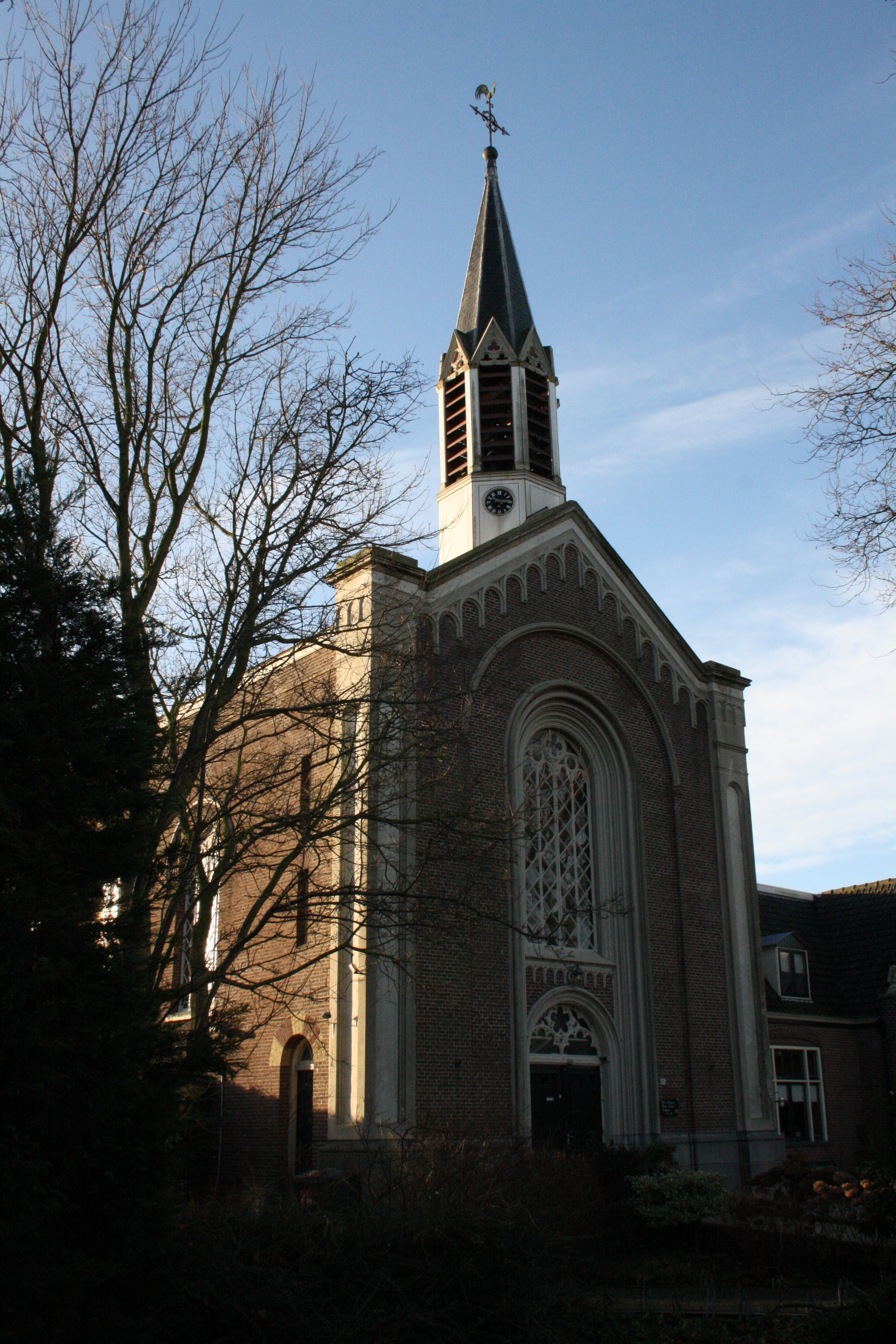
- Dutch Reformed Church in Lutjebroek

- Location in the Netherlands Location in the province of North Holland in the Netherlands
- Coordinates: 52°41′57″N 5°12′24″E
- Country: Netherlands
- Province: North Holland
- Municipality: Stede Broec

Area
  - Village: 4.39 km^{2} (1.69 sq mi)
  - Land: 3.95 km^{2} (1.53 sq mi)
  - Water: 0.44 km^{2} (0.17 sq mi)

Population (2025)
  - Village: 2,210
  - Urban: 2,110
  - Rural: 100

Lutjebroek is a village in the province of North Holland, Netherlands, and is part of the municipality of Stede Broec. Located in the region of West Friesland, the village has a population of just over 2,000 people. Known for the huge carnival parties.

== Etymology ==
The name Lutjebroek is derived from Old Dutch elements: "lutje", a regional form of luttel, meaning small, and "broek", an archaic word for swamp or marshland. The name originally referred to a small swamp in the area where the village was first settled.

In modern Dutch, however, the word broek is more commonly refers to pants, which gives the name Lutjebroek a humorous double meaning: "little pants." This linguistic coincidence is made even more amusing by the presence of the neighboring town Grootebroek, which under modern interpretation translates to "large pants."

Due to its amusing name, Lutjebroek has become a lighthearted colloquial reference in Dutch, used to describe "any insignificant speck on the map".

== Gallery ==
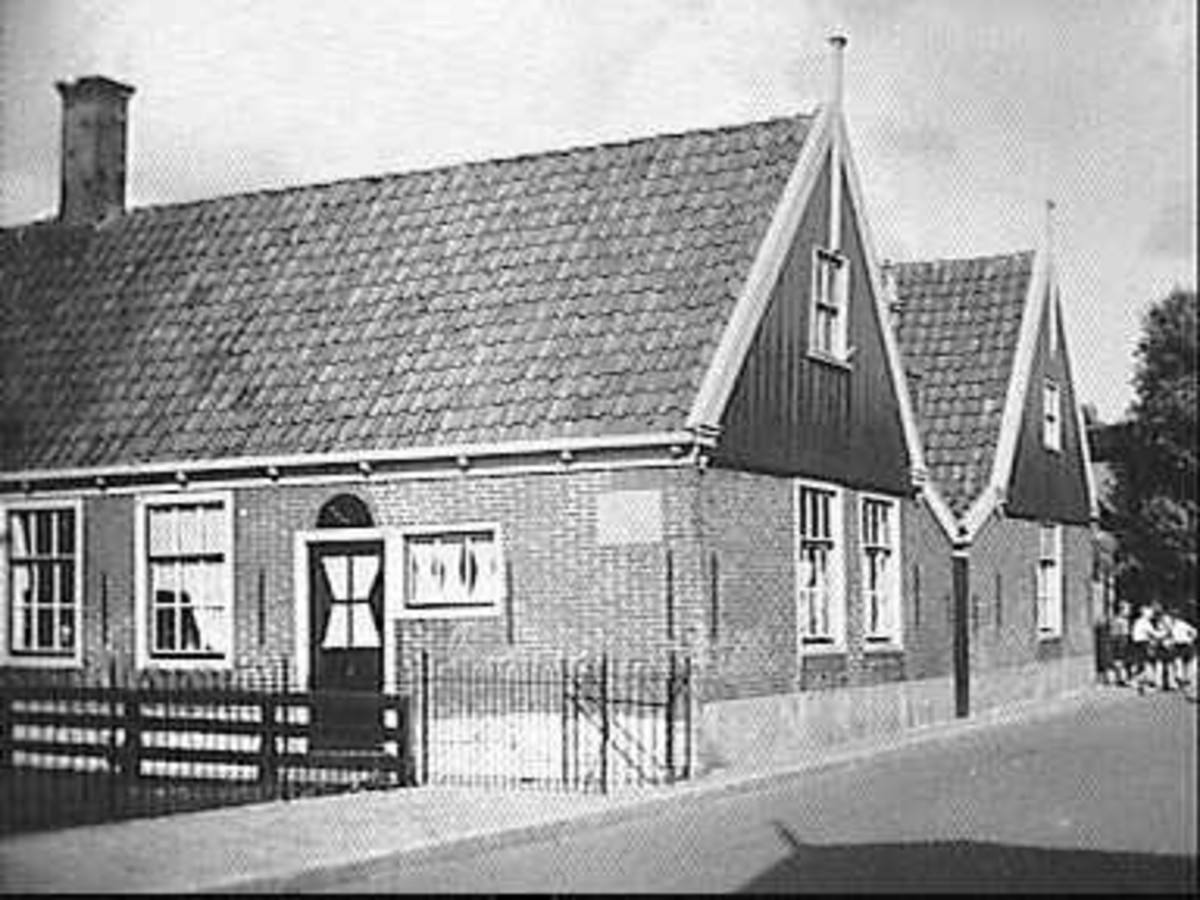
Workhouses (anno 1850)

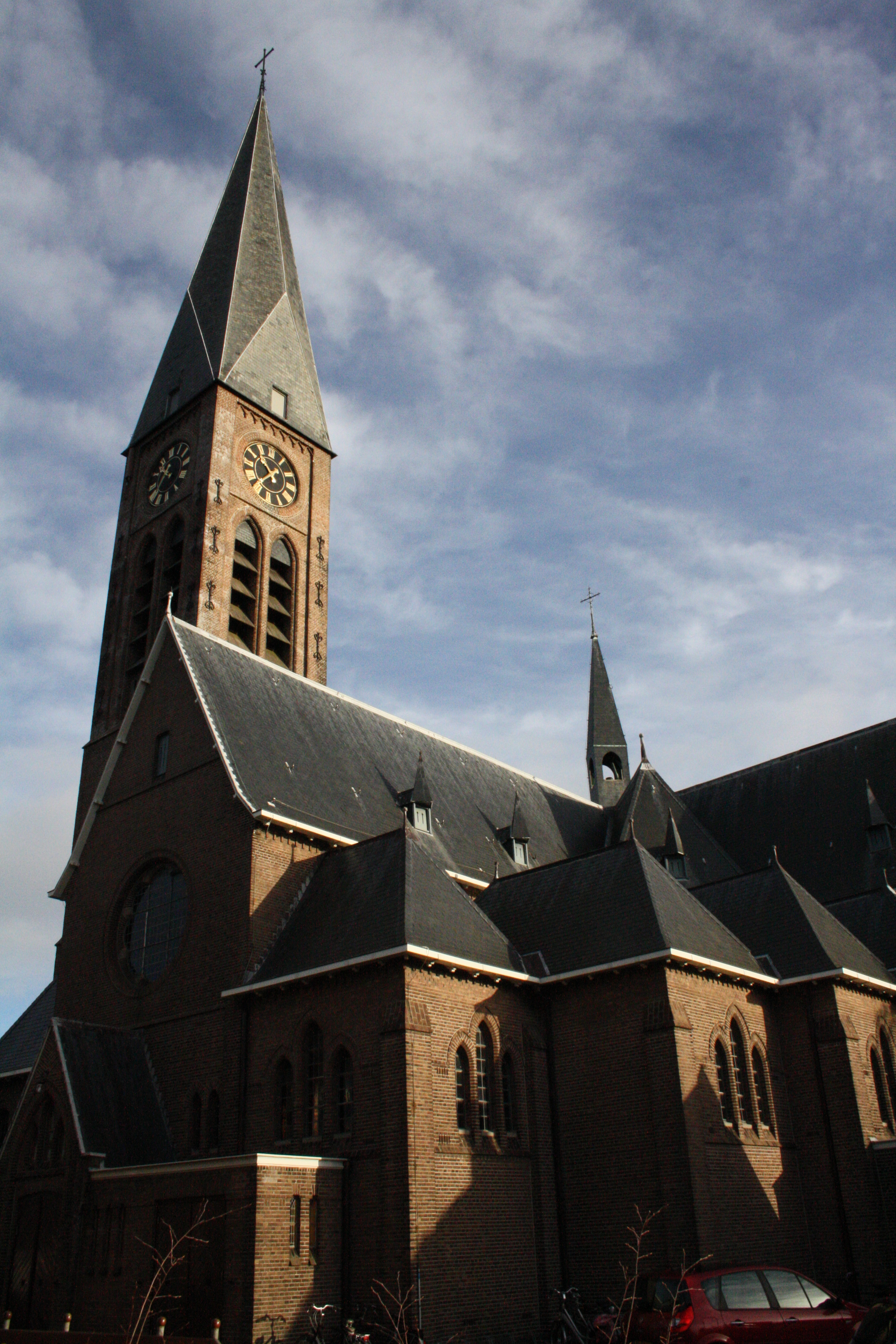
Sint-Nicolaaskerk (Saint Nicholas Church)

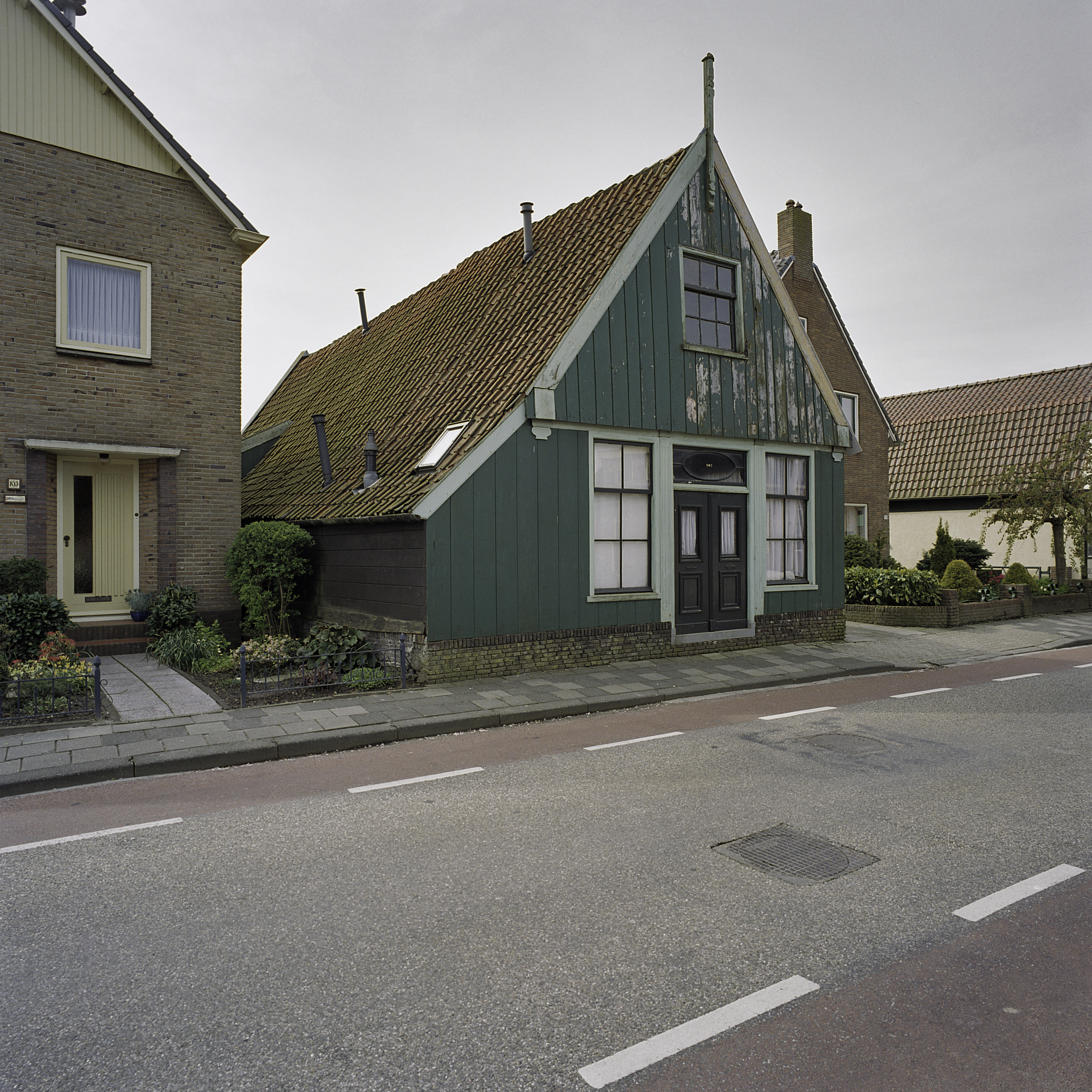
Historic home in Lutjebroek
