= Grootebroek =

- Town
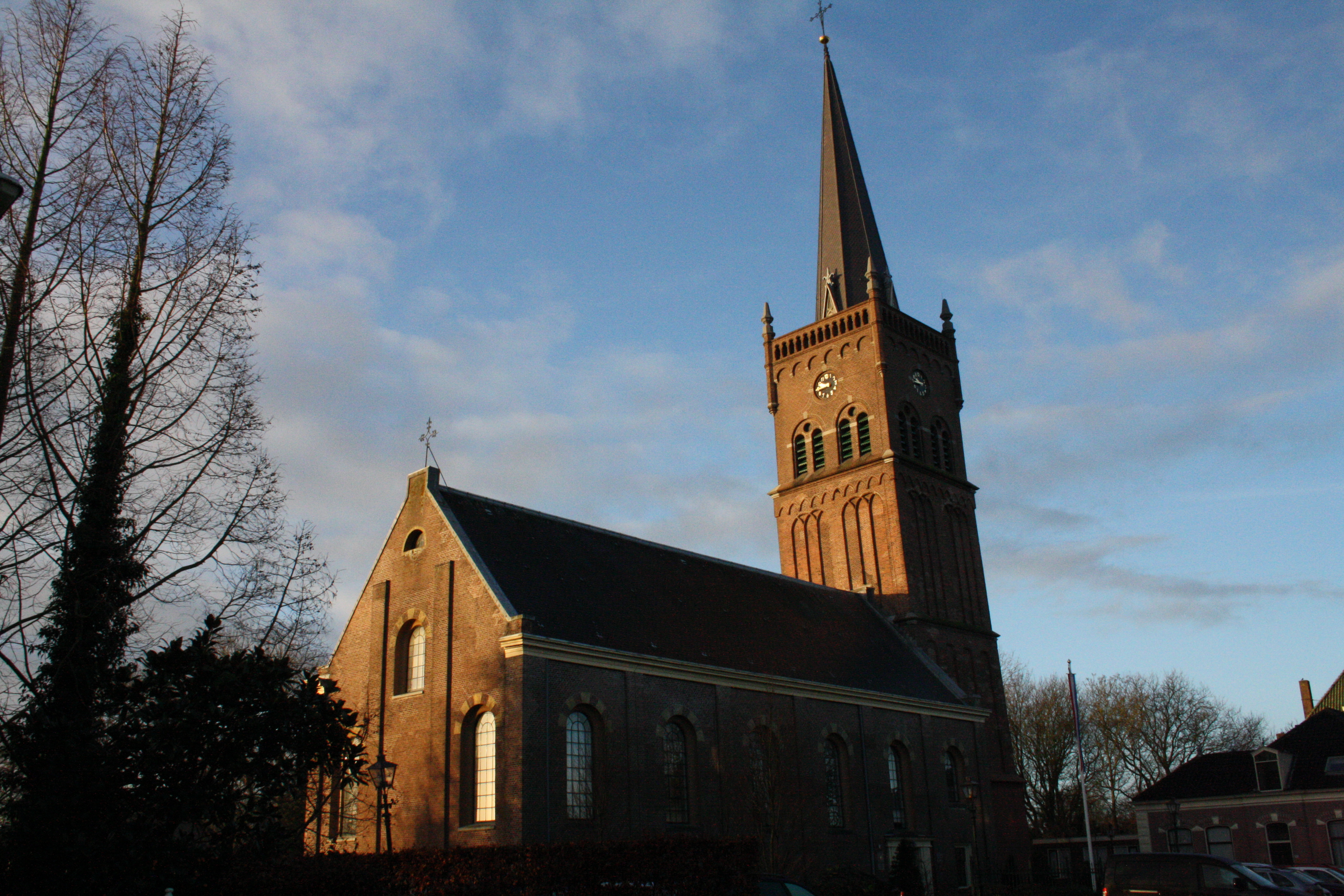
- Reformed Church

- Coat of arms

- Location in the Netherlands Location in the province of North Holland in the Netherlands
- Coordinates: 52°41′56″N 5°13′8″E
- Country: Netherlands
- Province: North Holland
- Municipality: Stede Broec

Area
  - Total: 5.25 km^{2} (2.03 sq mi)
  - Land: 4.95 km^{2} (1.91 sq mi)
  - Water: 0.33 km^{2} (0.13 sq mi)

Population (2023)
  - Total: 9,575

Grootebroek is a town in the Dutch province of North Holland. It is located in the municipality of Stede Broec. Grootebroek was a separate municipality until 1979. The town directly borders Bovenkarspel to the east and Lutjebroek to the west.

== Etymology ==
The name Grootebroek is derived from Old Dutch terms: "groot", meaning large, and "broek", an archaic word used to describe a swamp, marsh, or wetland. The name thus originally referred to a "large swamp," referencing the landscape on which the town was established.

However, in modern Dutch, "broek" is most commonly refers to pants. This linguistic shift has turned the town's name into a source of humor, as it can now be interpreted to mean "large pants." This has become a running joke among people in the area.

== Transportation ==
Grootebroek is served by the Bovenkarspel-Grootebroek railway station, which offers regular train services to larger cities such as Hoorn, Amsterdam, and Enkhuizen.

== Notable people ==
- Trudy van den Berg (1947)
- Klaas Vriend (1952–2019) speed skater
- Ed Groot (1957)
- Childhood home of Frank and Ronald de Boer (1970)

== Gallery ==
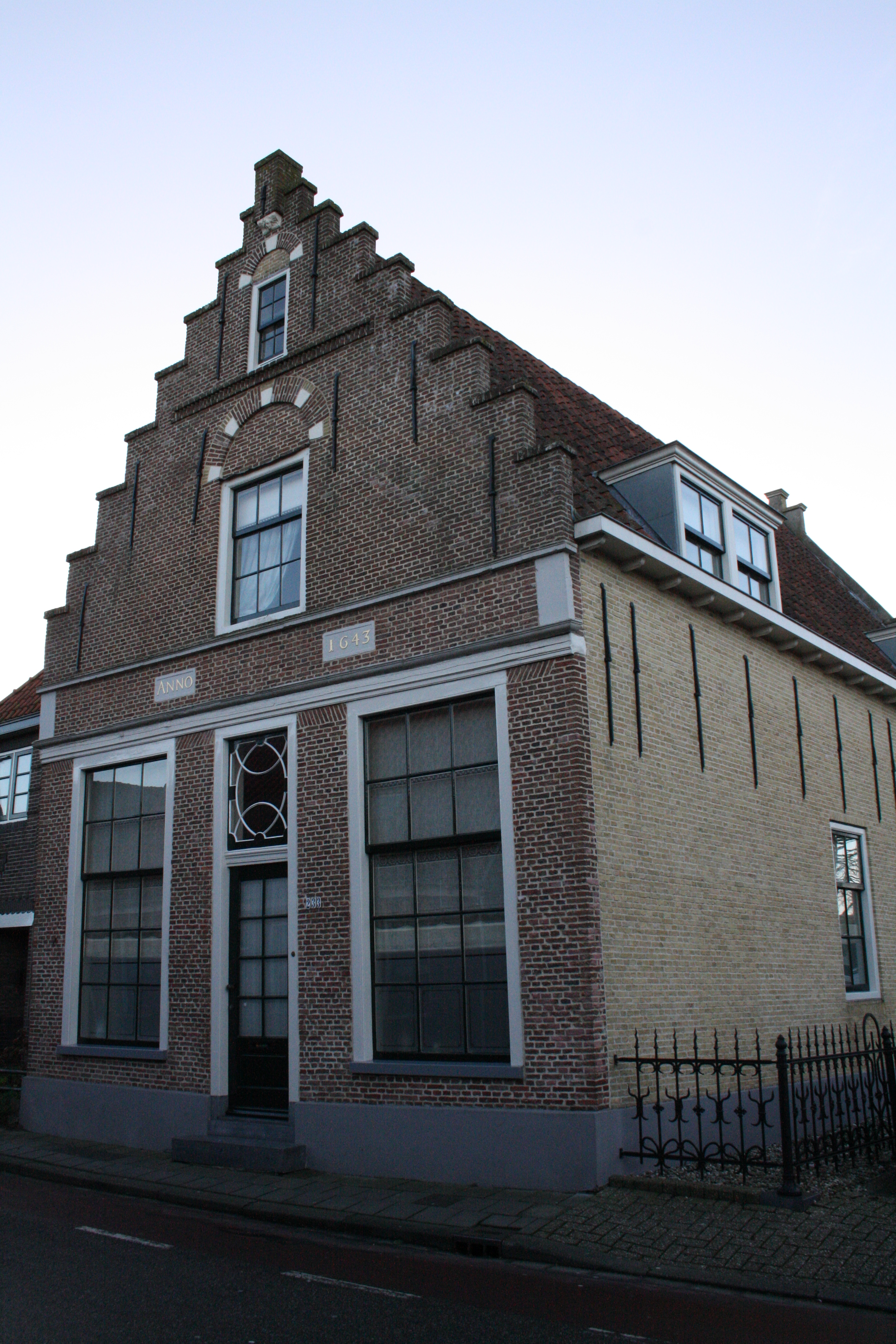
Home with stepped gable

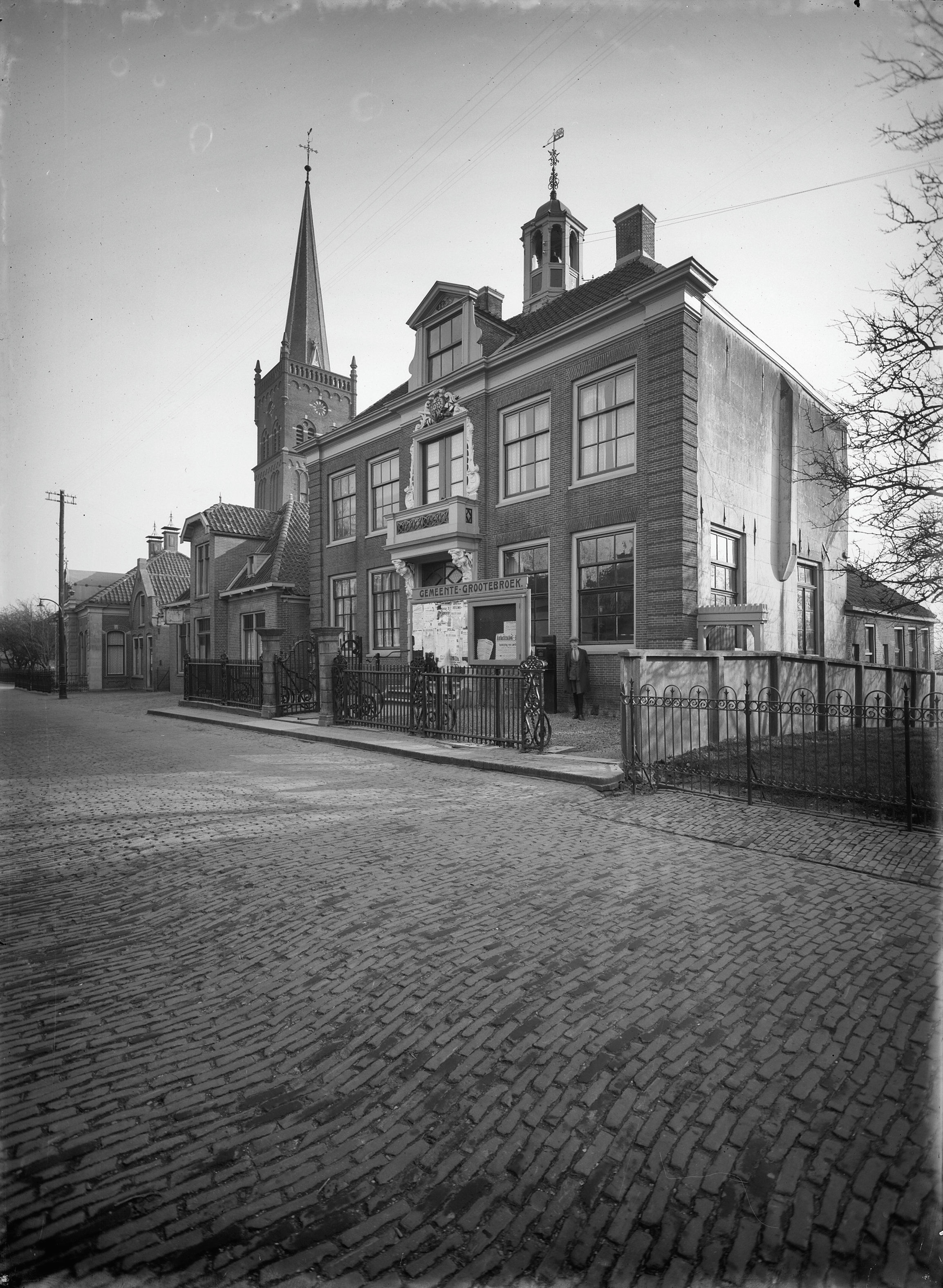
Former municipal building

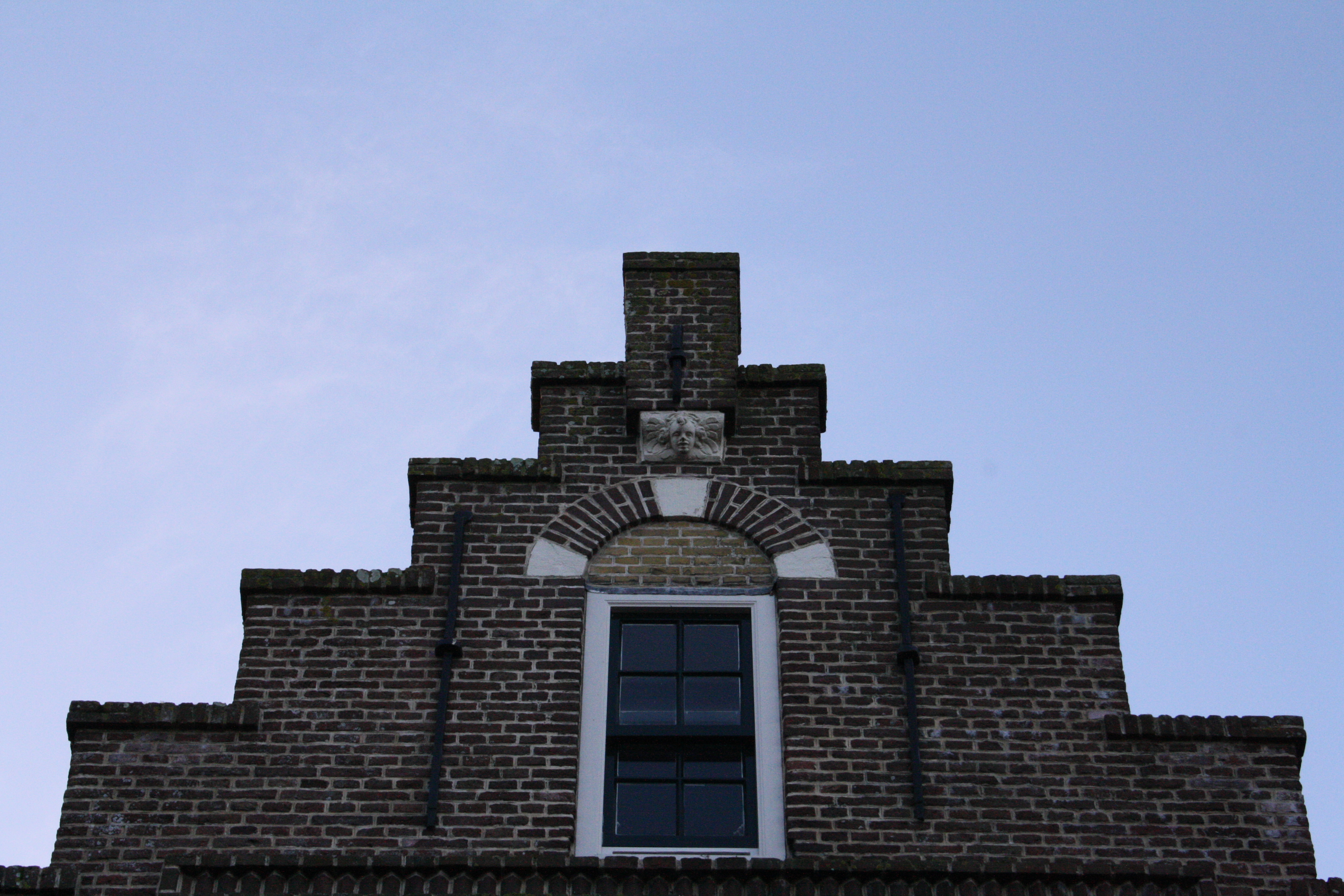
Stepped gable in Grootebroek
