= Safety region =

Safety regions Veiligheidsregios (Dutch)
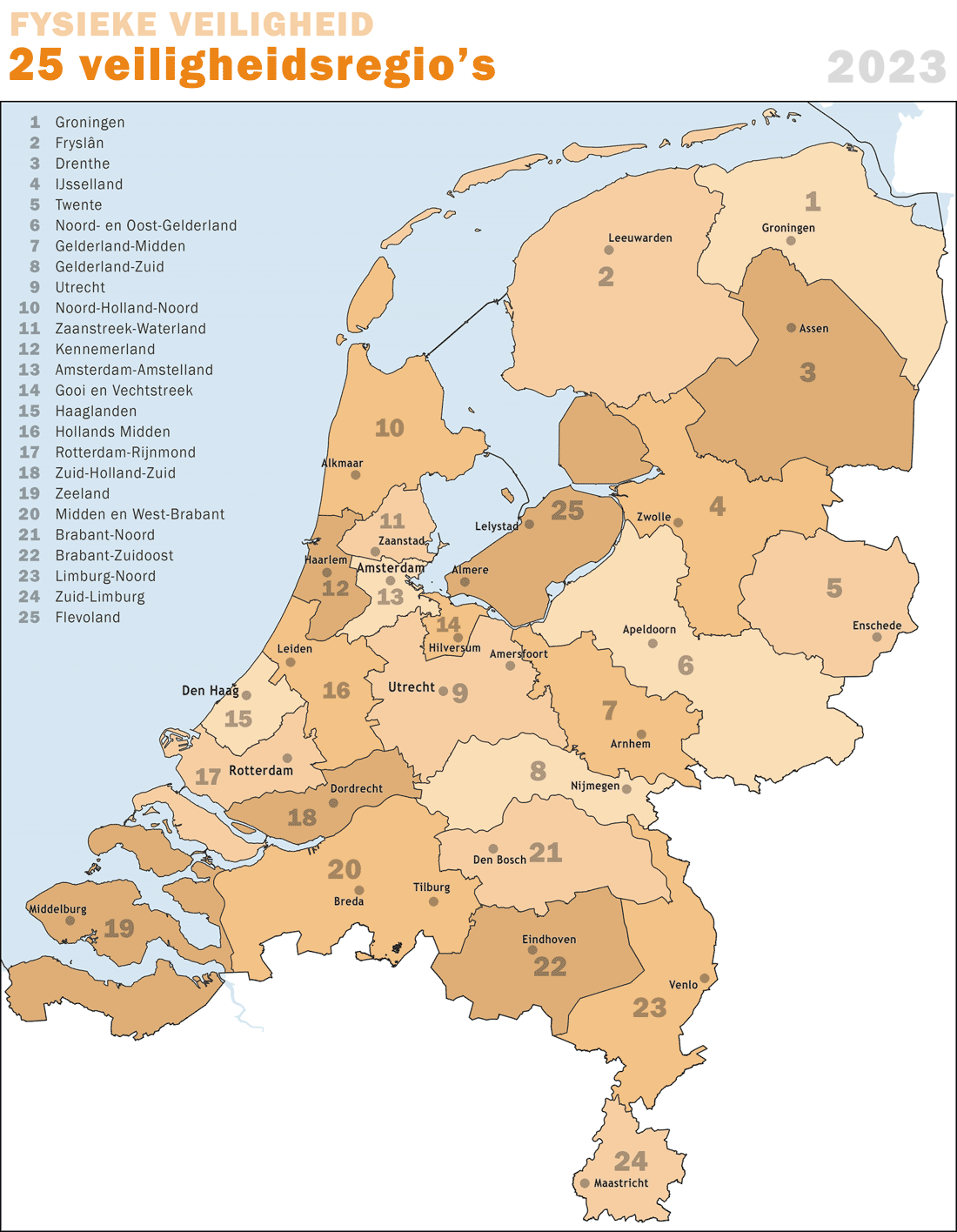
- Safety regions of the Netherlands
- Location: European Netherlands
- Number: 25 safety regions
- Subdivisions: Municipalities

In the European Netherlands, a safety region (Dutch: veiligheidsregio) is a public body whose task is to facilitate regional cooperation in dealing with crises, disasters and disruptions of public order.

Each municipal executive belongs to one of the twenty-five safety regions. Together they are responsible for drawing up joint regulations for crisis management and for administering the emergency services (fire brigade and Regional Medical Assistance Organisation) in their respective region.

== List of safety regions ==
No.	Safety region	Province	Chairperson	Seat
1	Groningen	Groningen	Mayor of Groningen	Groningen
2	Fryslân	Friesland	Mayor of Leeuwarden	Leeuwarden
3	Drenthe	Drenthe	Mayor of Assen	Assen
4	IJsselland	Overijssel	Mayor of Zwolle	Zwolle
5	Twente	Overijssel	Mayor of Enschede	Enschede
6	Noord- en Oost-Gelderland	Gelderland	Mayor of Apeldoorn	Apeldoorn
7	Gelderland-Midden	Gelderland	Mayor of Arnhem	Arnhem
8	Gelderland-Zuid	Gelderland	Mayor of Nijmegen	Nijmegen
9	Utrecht	Utrecht	Mayor of Utrecht	Utrecht
10	Noord-Holland-Noord	North Holland	Mayor of Alkmaar	Alkmaar
11	Zaanstreek-Waterland	North Holland	Mayor of Zaanstad	Zaandam
12	Kennemerland	North Holland	Mayor of Haarlemmermeer	Haarlem
13	Amsterdam-Amstelland	North Holland	Mayor of Amsterdam	Amsterdam
14	Gooi en Vechtstreek	North Holland	Mayor of Hilversum	Hilversum
15	Haaglanden	South Holland	Mayor of The Hague	The Hague
16	Hollands Midden	South Holland	Mayor of Leiden	Leiden
17	Rotterdam-Rijnmond	South Holland	Mayor of Rotterdam	Rotterdam
18	Zuid-Holland-Zuid	South Holland	Mayor of Dordrecht	Dordrecht
19	Zeeland	Zeeland	Mayor of Terneuzen	Middelburg
20	Midden- en West-Brabant	North Brabant	Mayor of Tilburg	Breda
21	Brabant-Noord	North Brabant	Mayor of 's-Hertogenbosch	's-Hertogenbosch
22	Brabant-Zuidoost	North Brabant	Mayor of Eindhoven	Eindhoven
23	Limburg-Noord	Limburg	Mayor of Venlo	Venlo
24	Limburg-Zuid	Limburg	Mayor of Maastricht	Maastricht
25	Flevoland	Flevoland	Mayor of Almere	Lelystad

== See also ==
- Municipal Health Service
