= Vereniging De Zaansche Molen =

Vereniging Zaansche Molen, Netherlands

- De Zaansche Molen
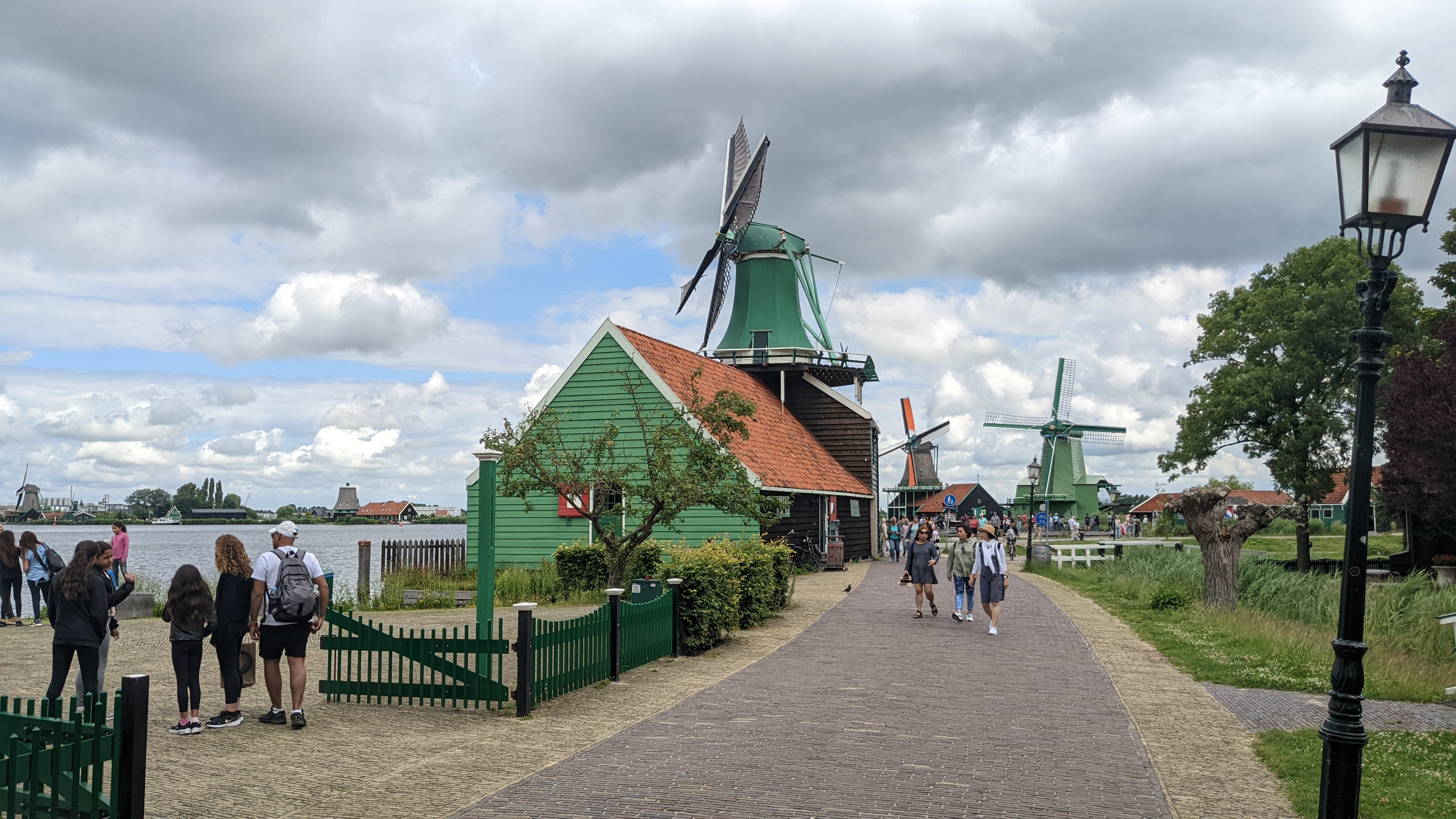
- Zaan region
- Established: 1925
- Location: Schansend 1 Zaandam, Netherlands
- Type: Windmill Association, ICOM, ICOMOS, De Hollandsche Molen
- Collection size: 60,000+ objects
- Visitors: 520.000
- Director: Björn Stenvers
- Curators: Henk Heijnen; Jippe Kreuning
- Website: www.zaanschemolen.nl

Vereniging De Zaansche Molen is an association that is committed to the heritage protection and preservation of the remaining industrial mills in the Zaanstreek, concentrated in and around the Zaanse Schans. Wind-powered machines have been used earlier.

== History ==
On February 26, 1925, the oil mill De Zoeker was hit by a tornado. This affected both schoolmaster and artist Frans Mars, who published an open letter in the newspaper De Zaanlander. He also sought and found supporters, including Pieter Boorsma. This ultimately led to the founding of the association in the same year, 1925.

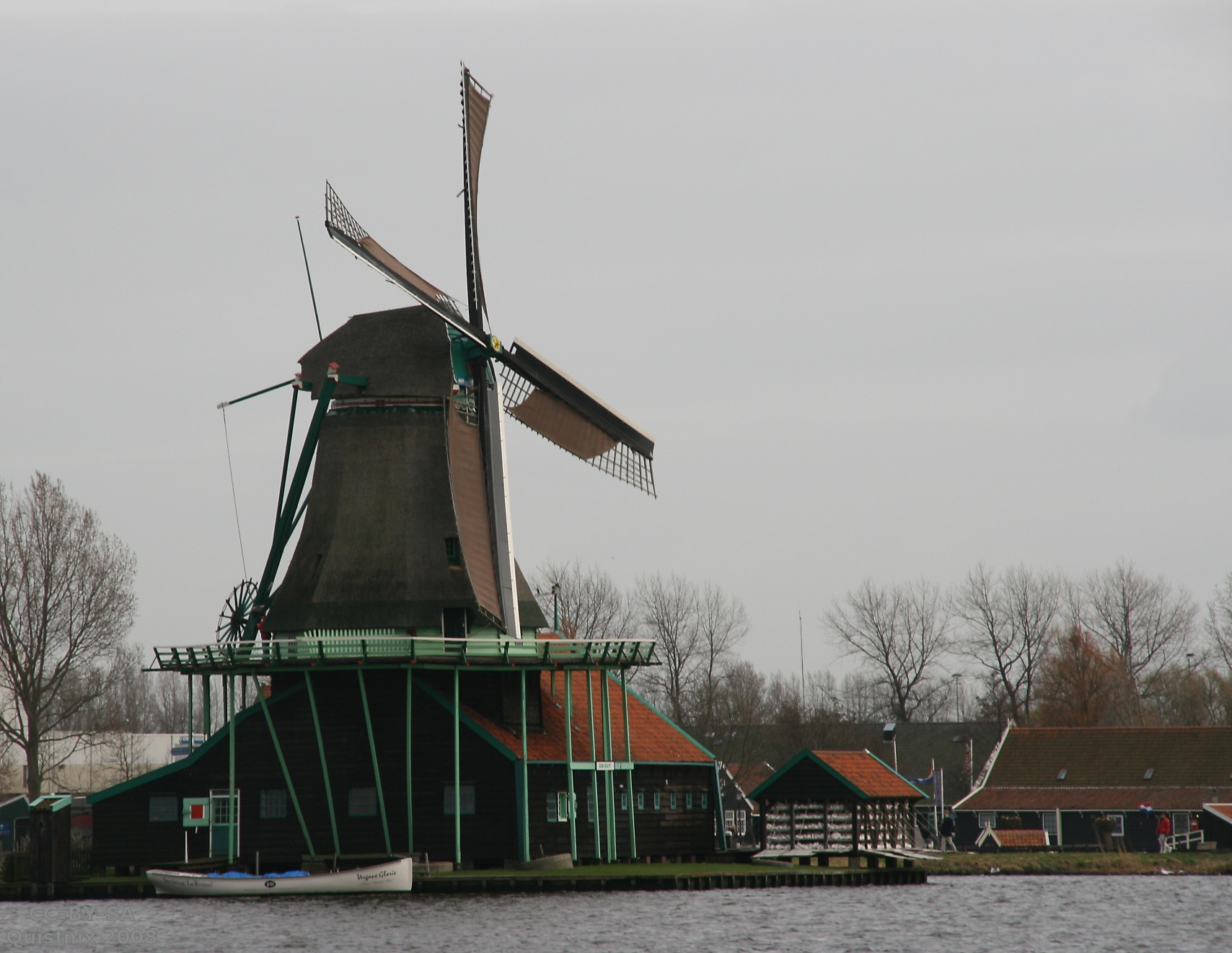
View of the mill.

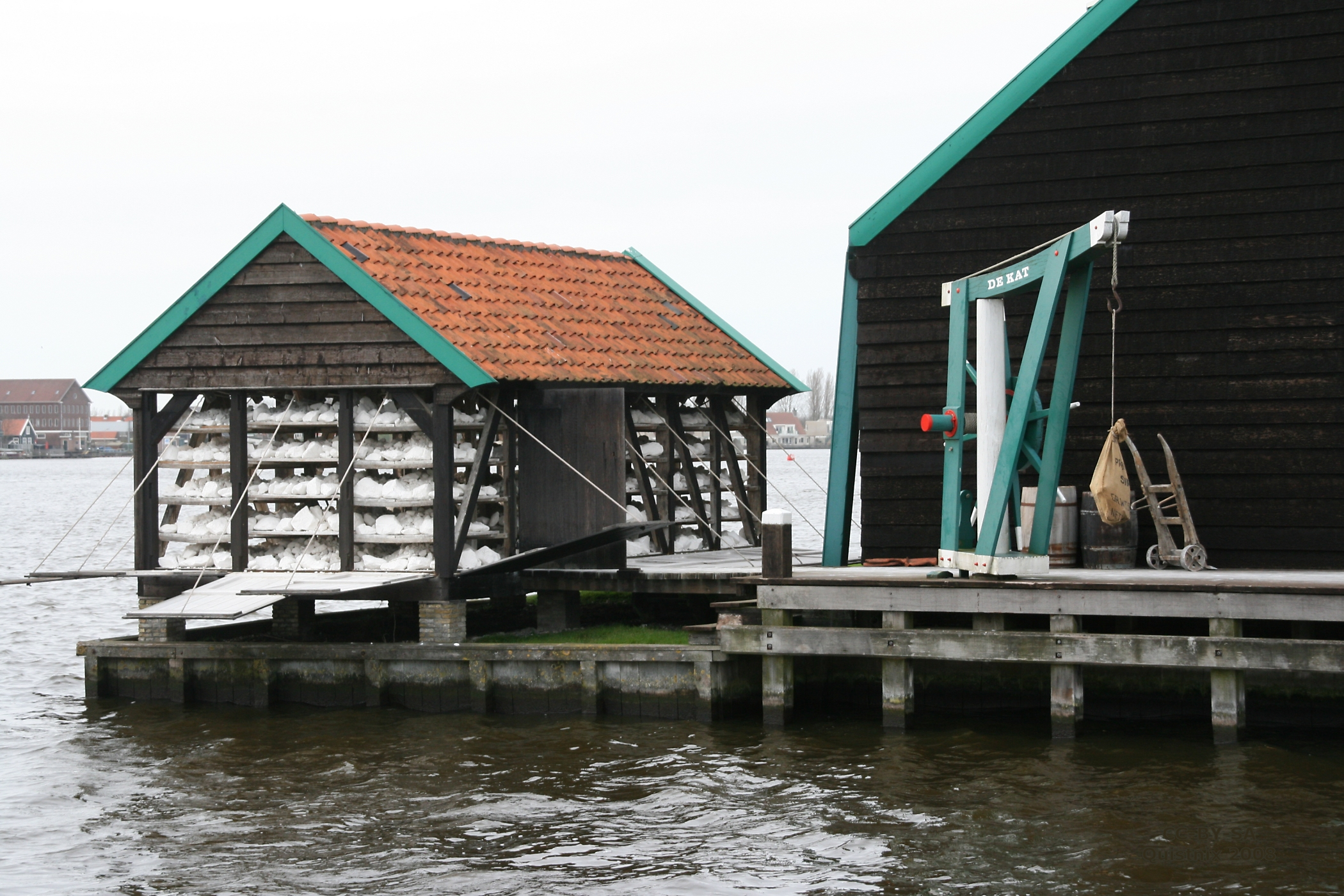
Drying shed for chalk.

== Foundation Museum ==
The first act was an exhibition about windmills at the public primary school in Koog aan de Zaan, which attracted a considerable amount of interest and led to increased membership. The plan for a windmill museum gained momentum when the building known as the "House with the Iron Bridge" became available, which had to be demolished for the construction of Koogerpark. As a compromise, it was moved to the edge of the park and the association established it as the Windmill Museum. The association's office is also located there. On May 24, 1928, the Mill Museum was opened.

== The first Mills ==
In the early days, the association primarily focused on raising funds for struggling mill owners, thus preserving their mills. This changed in 1939 when the oil mill Het Pink was offered by the Zaan region Tourist Office. The mill was restored, but the opening on May 10, 1940, was canceled due to the German invasion of the Netherlands. Over the years, the association's mill ownership grew to 14. In 2007, the newly built Het Jonge Schaap mill was added to the association, giving the Zaan region another hexagonal smock mill. In 2014, De Jonge Dirk came into the possession of the association, as well as the meadow mill De Zwaan in Westzaan

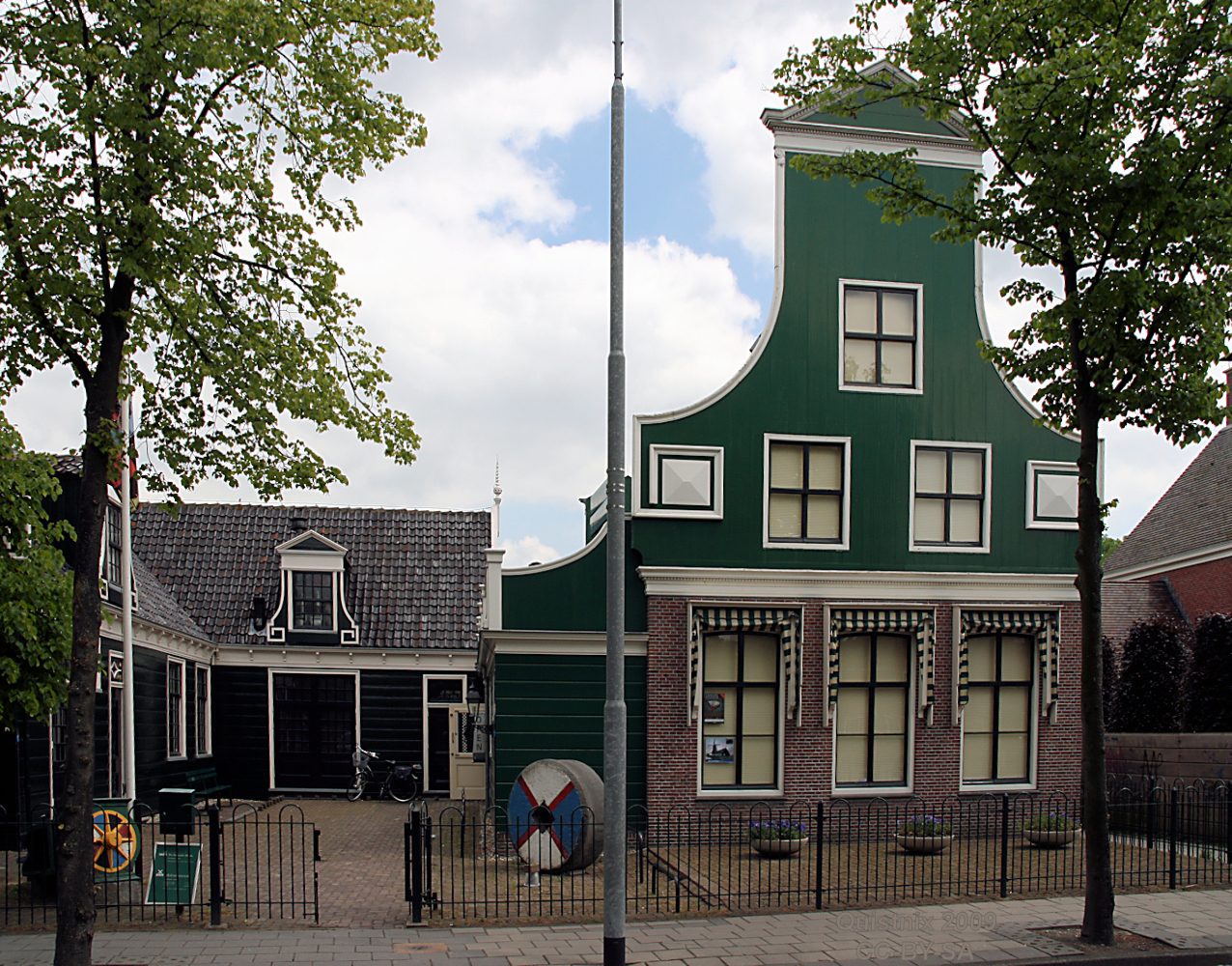
The former Millmuseum Koog aan de Zaan.

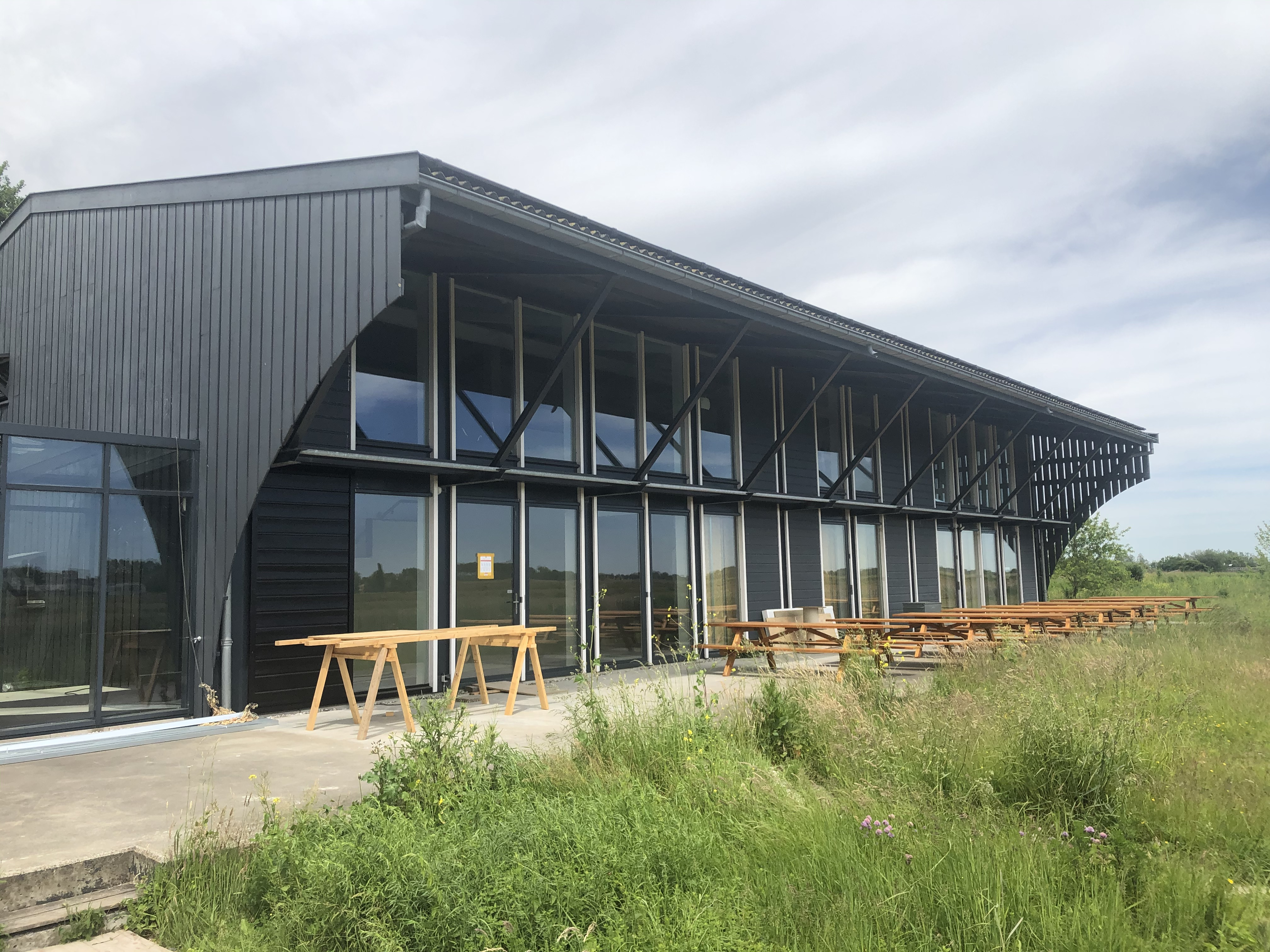
The current Millmuseum

== The current collection or our Mills ==
In addition to the mill museum, the association owns the following mills:

- Oil mill: De Bonte Hen, De Ooijevaar, Het Pink, De Zoeker, De Os, Zaandam.
- Sawmill: De Gekroonde Poelenburg, Het Jonge Schaap.
- Gristmill: De Pale Death, De Koker.
- Peeling mill: Het Prinsenhof.
- Papermills: De Schoolmeester, De Jonge Dirk.
- Spice mill: De Huisman.
- Paint mill: De Kat.
- Pasture mill: De Zwaan.

== Sources ==
- Vereniging de zaansche molen 1925-1985. Nieuwe Uitgevers B.V. / Europese Bibliotheek, Zaltbommel, 1985, ISBN 9789028832428
- Frans Mars, een leven in de Zaansche molen. Stichting Uitgeverij Noord-Holland, Wormer, 2003, ISBN 9789071123702
- De Zaansche Molen, 100 jaar in beweging. Koopmans Drukkerij,Zwaag, 2025, ISBN 9789081779937
- De Zaansche Molen, vijfenzeventig jaar behoud van industrieel erfgoed, Rob Kooijman, 2000, Vereniging De Zaansche Molen/ Koog aan de Zaan & Inmerc, Wormer.
