= Het Klaverblad, Zaandam =

Windmill in Zaanstad, Netherlands

Coordinates: 52.4776°N 4.8138°E

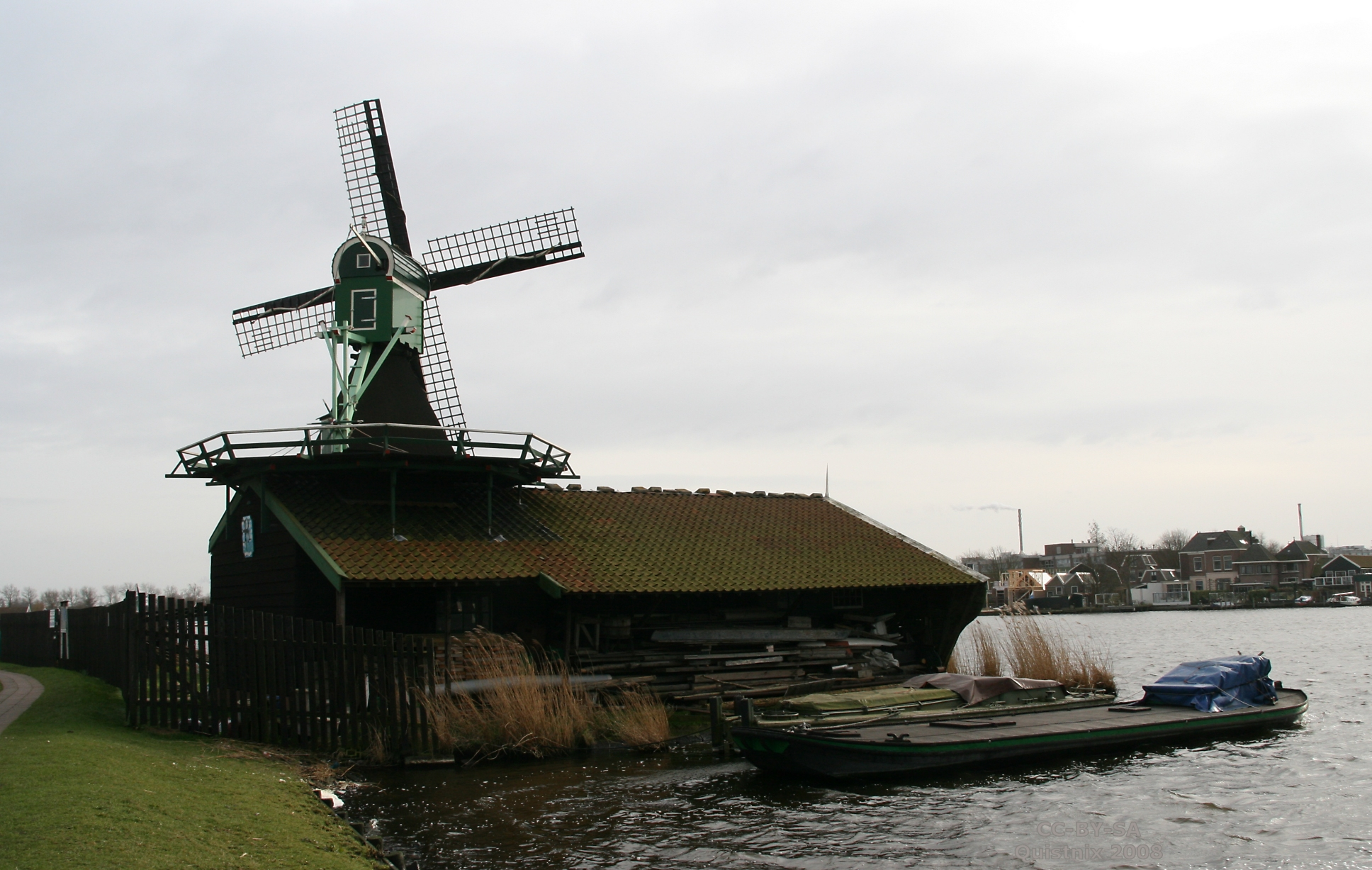
Het Klaverblad

Het Klaverblad (The Cloverleaf) is a small wooden saw mill, located in the Zaanse Schans, in the municipality of Zaanstad.

The mill was built by Ru Pos on the site of the previous KROMO warehouse. This private initiative was turned into foundation "Het Klaverblad" with the purpose of building, running and maintaining the sawmill. The sails of the mill first turned in 2005.

== See also ==
- De Kat
- De Huisman
- De Os
- De Zoeker
- De Gekroonde Poelenburg
- De Bonte Hen
