= De Kat, Zaandam =

Windmill in Zaanstad, Netherlands

Coordinates: 52.4750°N 4.8178°E

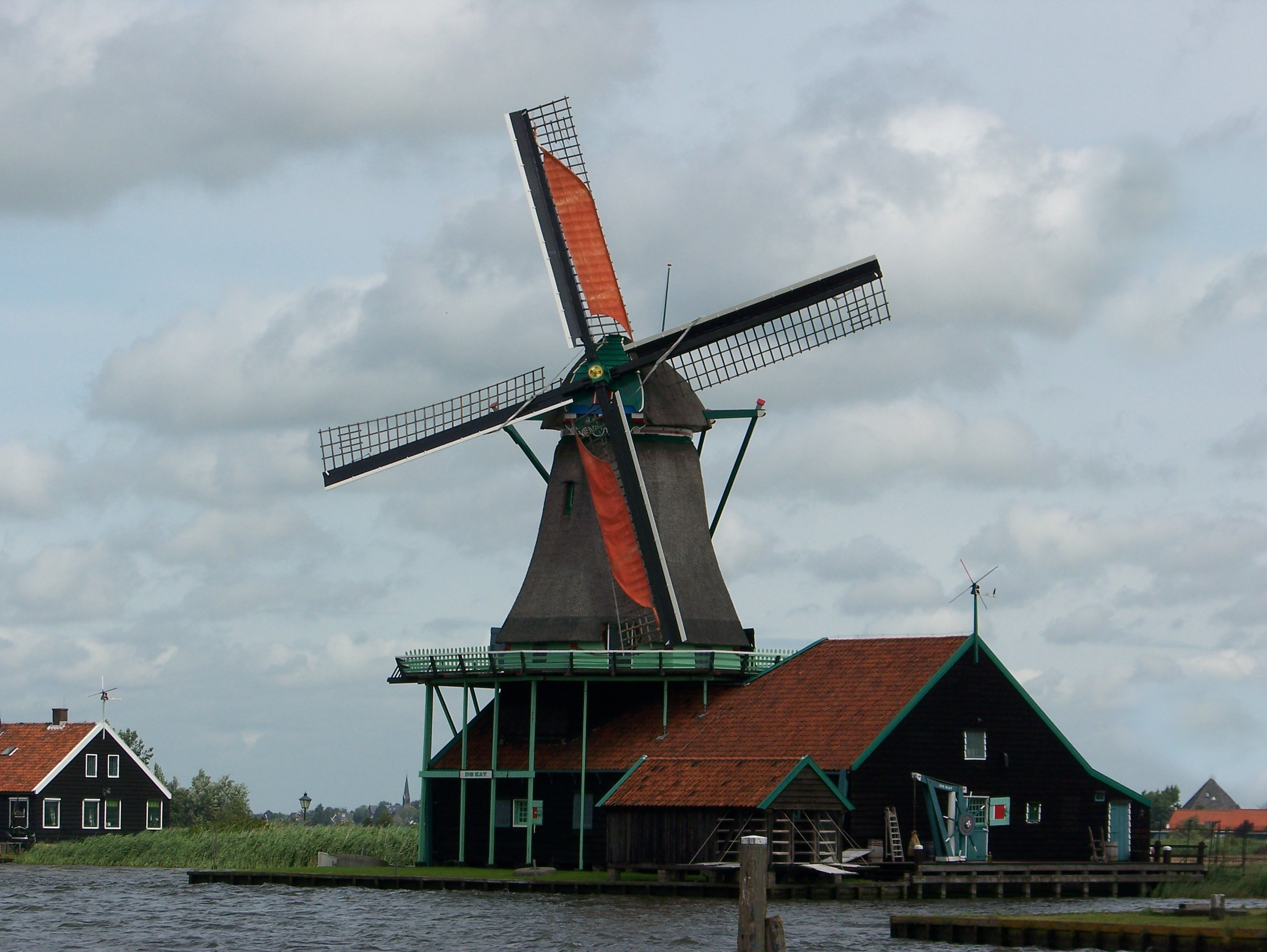
De Kat in 2007

De Kat is the only remaining working windmill in the world which produces paint. The mill is in the Zaanse Schans, Zaanstad. De Kat is an octagonal smock mill. Robbert Kempenaar has been the head miller of De Kat since 2007.

== History ==
The original 'De Kat' mill was built in 1646 as an oil mill. In 1781, it was destroyed by fire, but was rebuilt by 1782. The mill was in use until 1904 and was then partially demolished. In 1960, the eight-sided paint mill 'De Duinjager' was removed from its former position due to urban development and placed on top of the old 'De Kat' storehouse. The mill again grinds raw materials, including minerals and chalk, to make pigments for paints traditionally. The mill is owned by the Vereniging De Zaansche Molen.

The mill, open to the public, receives 130,000 visitors annually, making it the most visited windmill in the Netherlands.

== Gallery ==
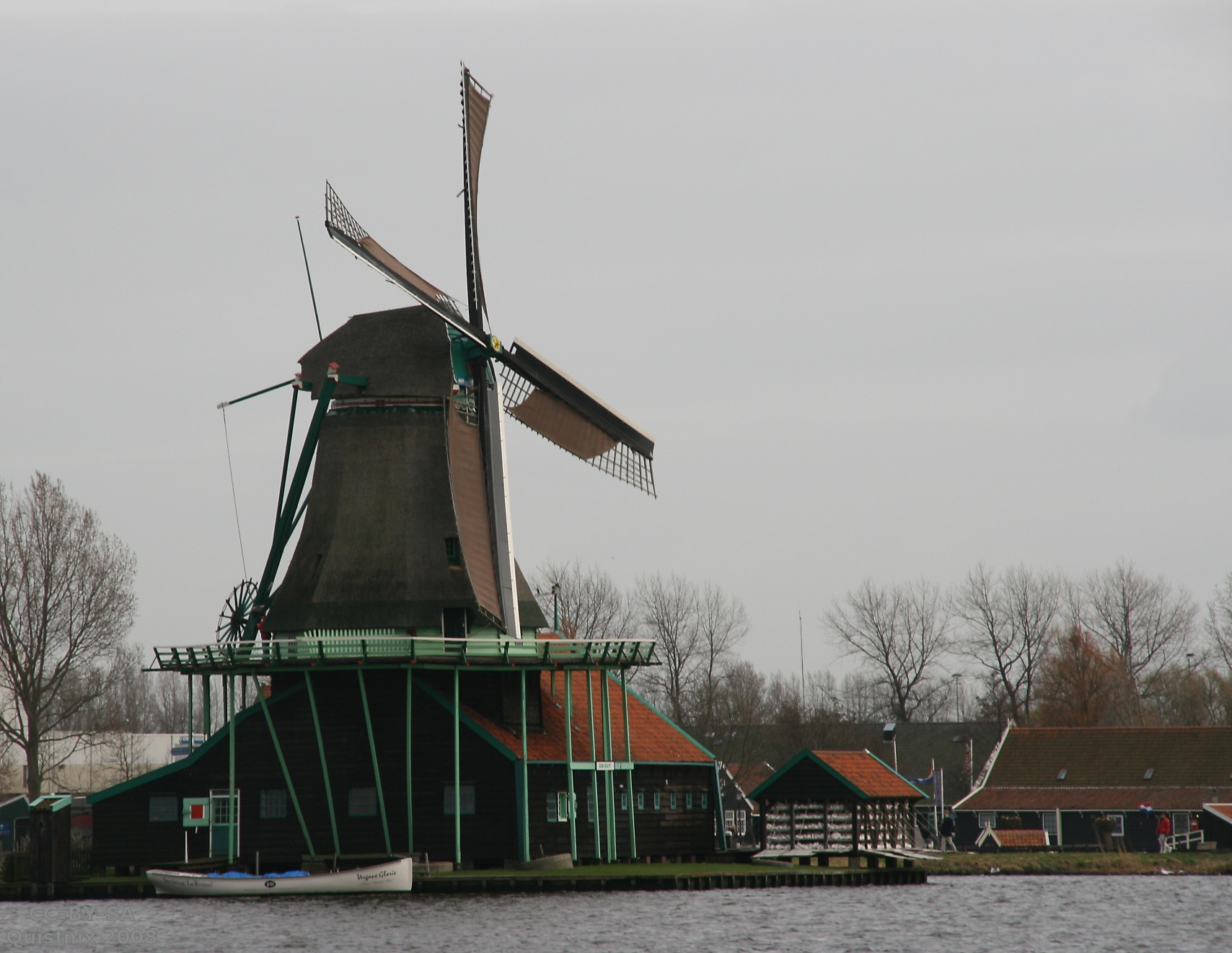
View of the mill

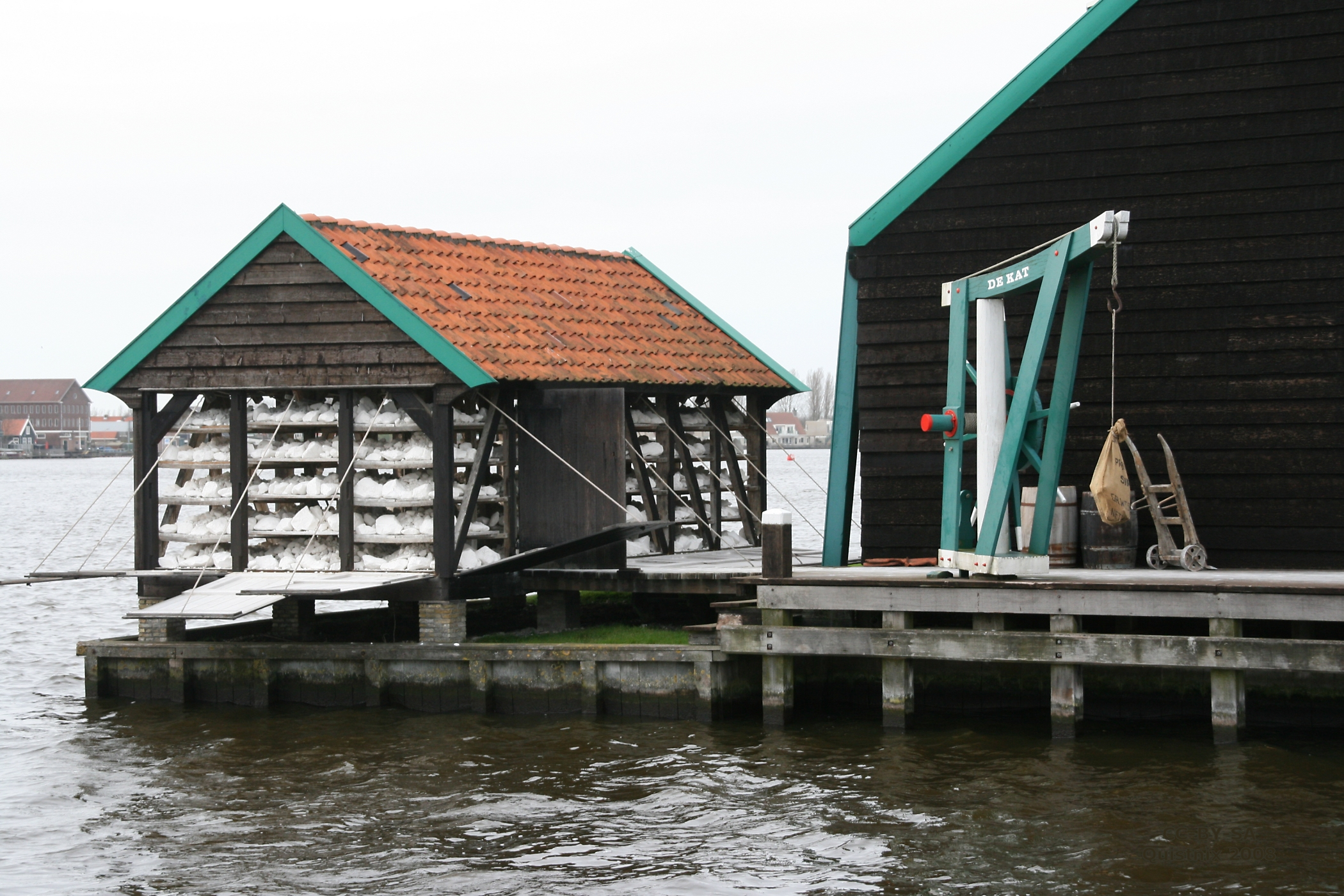
Drying shed for chalk

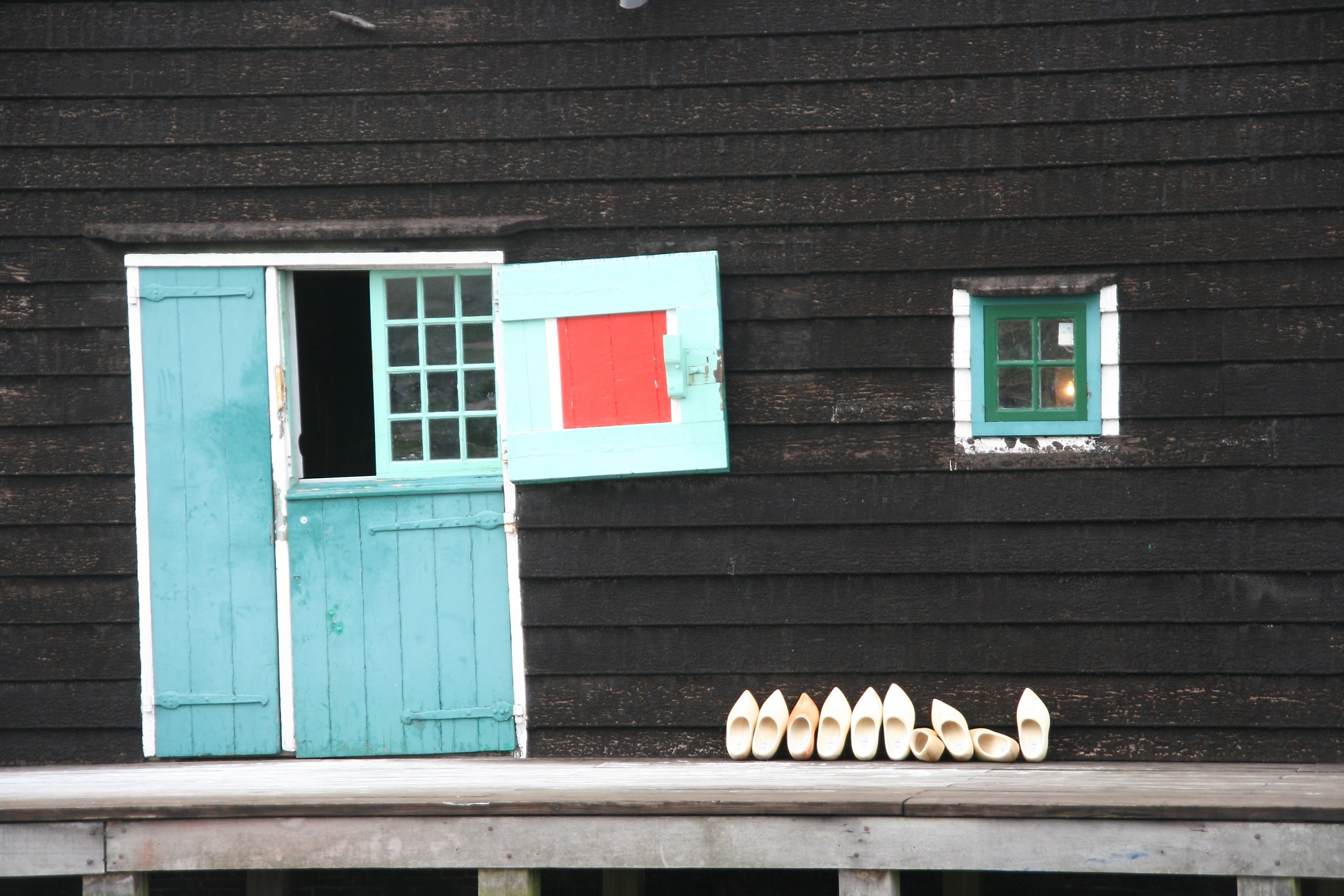
Clogs at the door

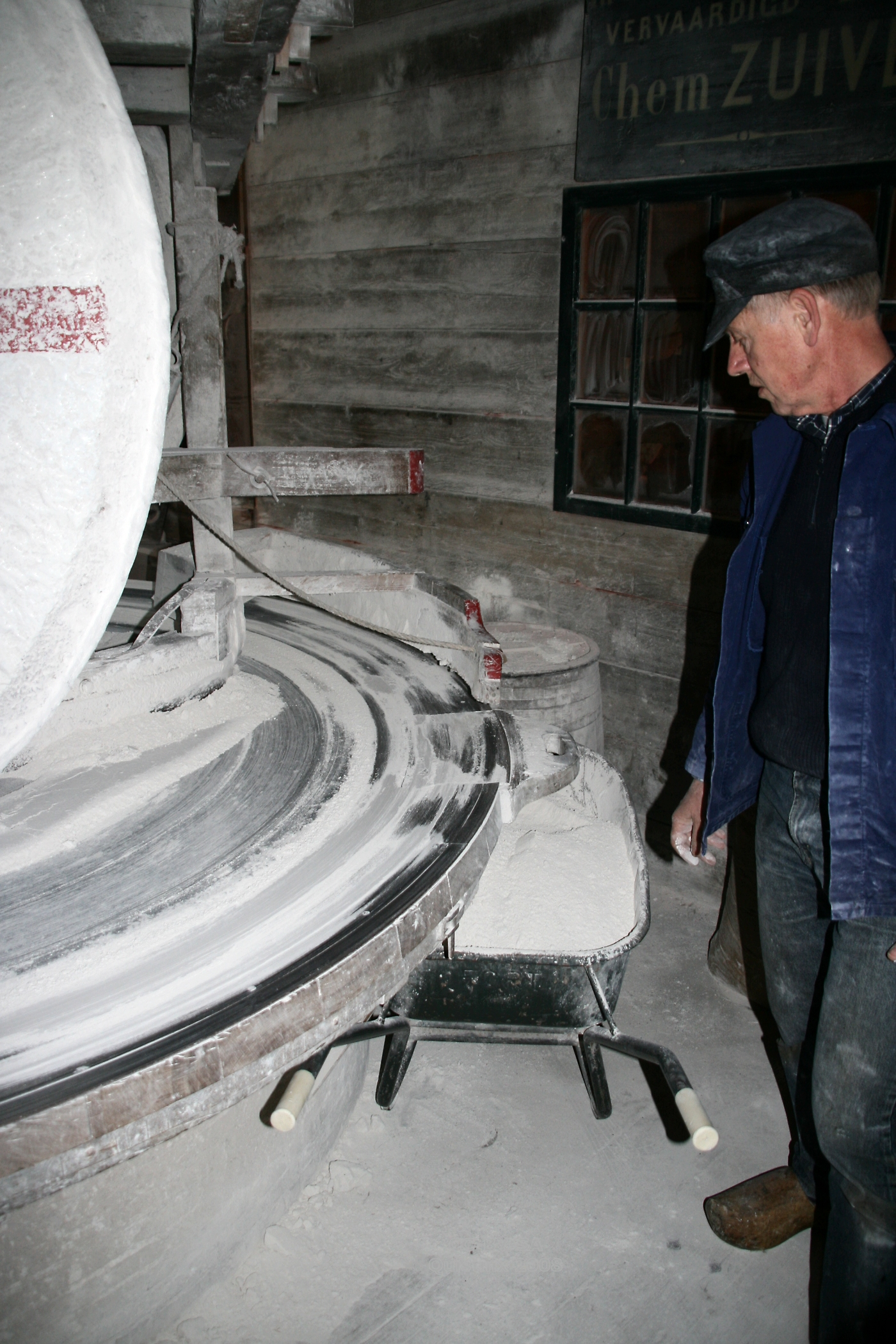
Side stones

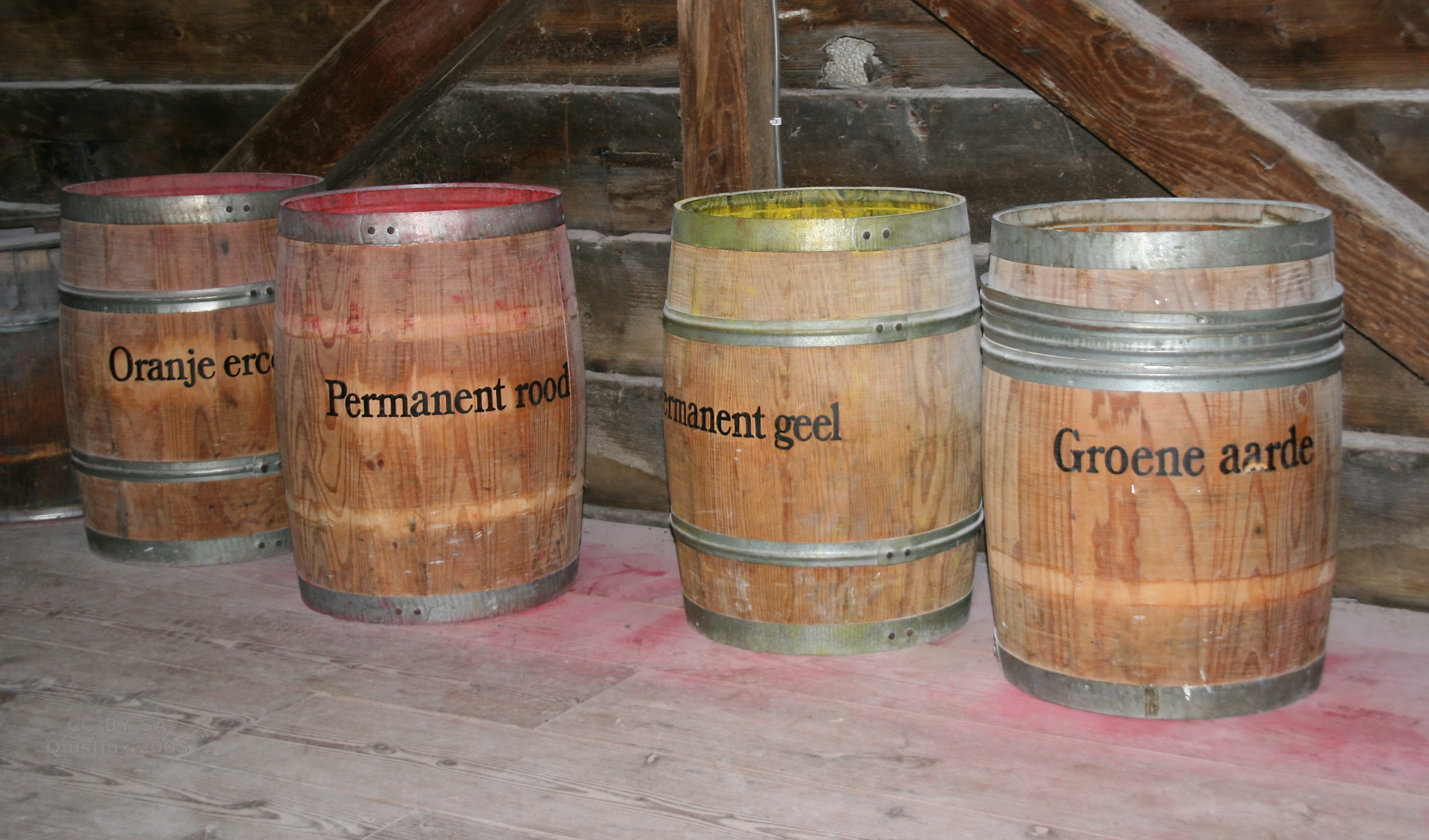
Pigment containers

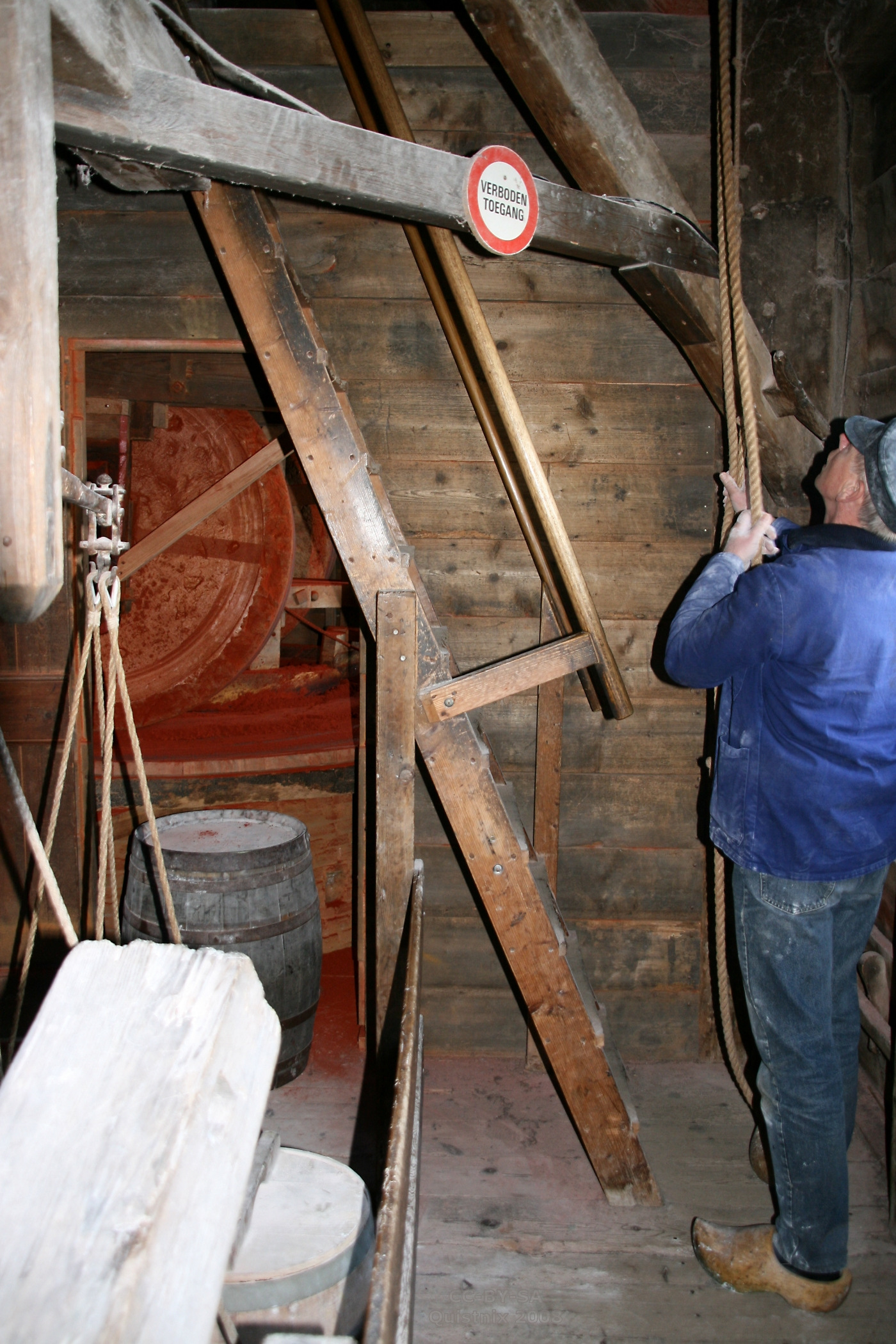
Side stone with red pigment

== See also ==
- De Huisman, Zaandam
- De Os, Zaandam
- De Zoeker, Zaandam
- De Gekroonde Poelenburg, Zaandam
- Het Jonge Schaap, Zaandam
- Smock mill
