= De Os, Zaandam =

Windmill in Zaandam, Netherlands

Coordinates: 52.4768°N 4.8156°E

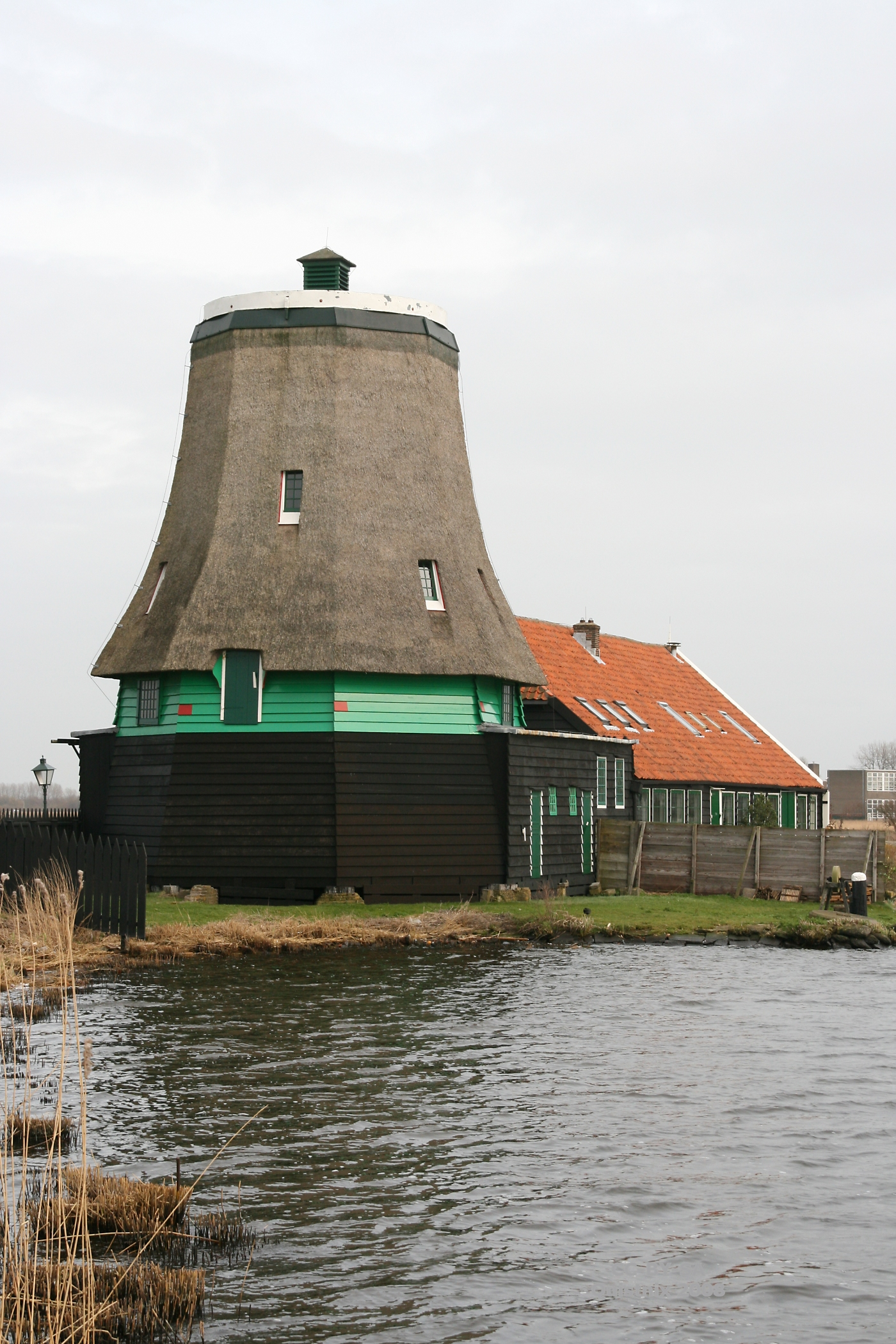
Windmill De Os

De Os (Dutch pronunciation: [də ˈʔɔs]) is an oil windmill in the Zaanse Schans, Zaanstad.

Between the saw mills Het Jonge Schaap and Het Klaverblad is the hull of the oil mill De Os. The mill was built in 1663 and is one of the oldest industrial windmills in the Zaan. Until 1916 the mill was operating on wind power. In that year, the hood and wings were removed; the Os was converted to a warehouse. The barns are now occupied by the mill. The mill body was restored in recent years.

== See also ==
- De Kat, Zaandam
- De Huisman, Zaandam
- De Zoeker, Zaandam
- De Gekroonde Poelenburg, Zaanse Schans
- Het Jonge Schaap, Zaandam
