= De Huisman, Zaandam =

Windmill in Zaanstad, Netherlands

Coordinates: 52.4731°N 4.8166°E

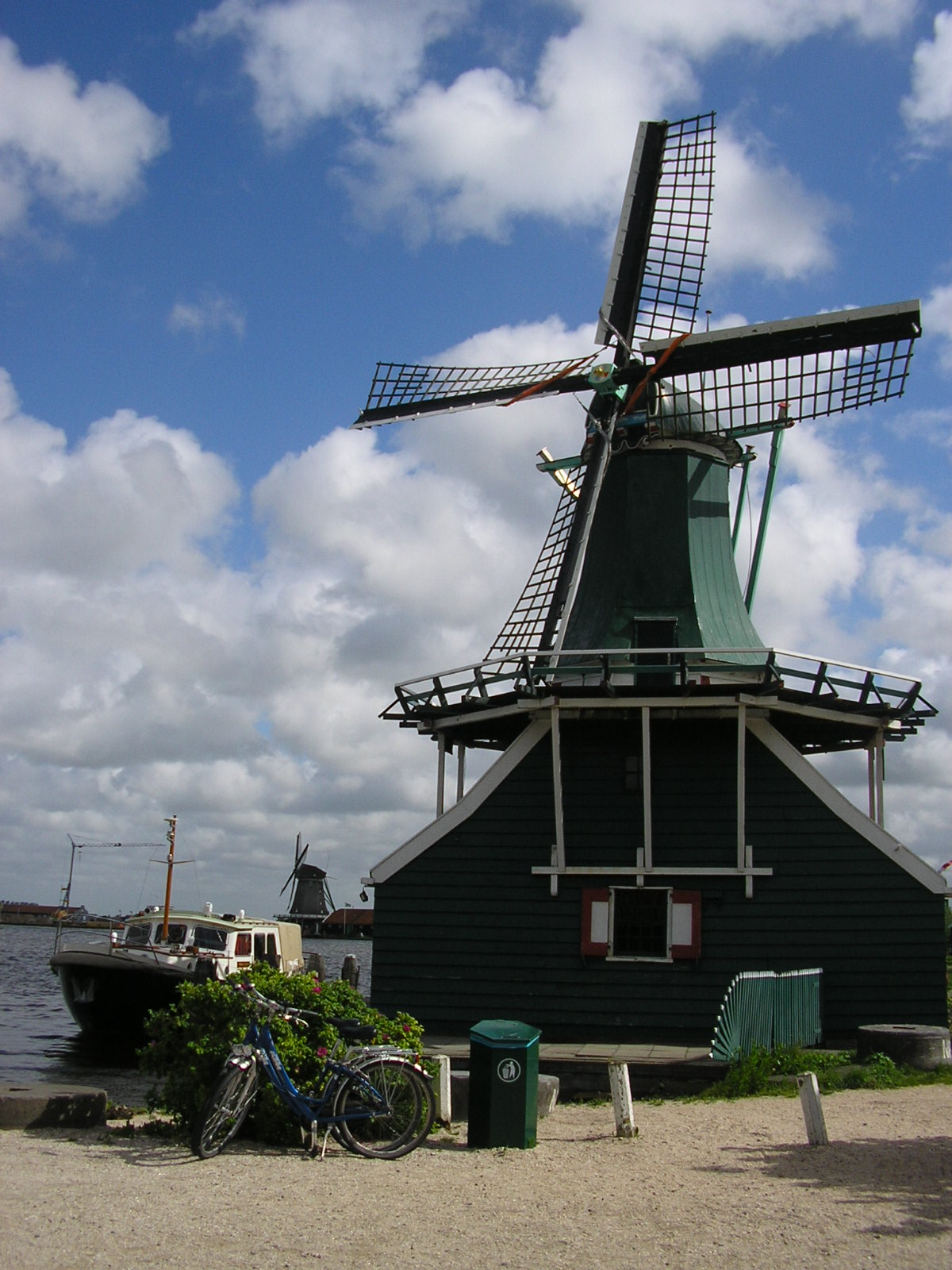
De Huisman in 2006

De Huisman is a small octagonal mill at the Zaanse Schans in the Zaanstad, and currently makes mustard.

'De Huisman' has been located on the Zaanse Schans since 1955, next to the warehouse 'De Haan'. The mill was probably built in 1786 on the Blauwe Pad ("Blue Path", now "Claude Monet street") in Zaandam. The mill has functioned as a snuff mill (milling tobacco), a mustard mill, and a saw mill.

At the Zaanse Schans, the mill was converted again into a mustard mill, though it mills the mustard seeds in a modern, not wind-operated way. There are advanced plans for the mill to be restored to a traditional mustard mill, and to give the public the opportunity to visit the mill. The mill is owned by the Vereniging De Zaansche Molen.

== See also ==
- De Kat, Zaandam
- De Os, Zaandam
- De Zoeker, Zaandam
- De Gekroonde Poelenburg, Zaandam
- Het Jonge Schaap, Zaandam
