= De Zoeker =

Windmill in Zaandam, Netherlands

Coordinates: 52.4760°N 4.8175°E

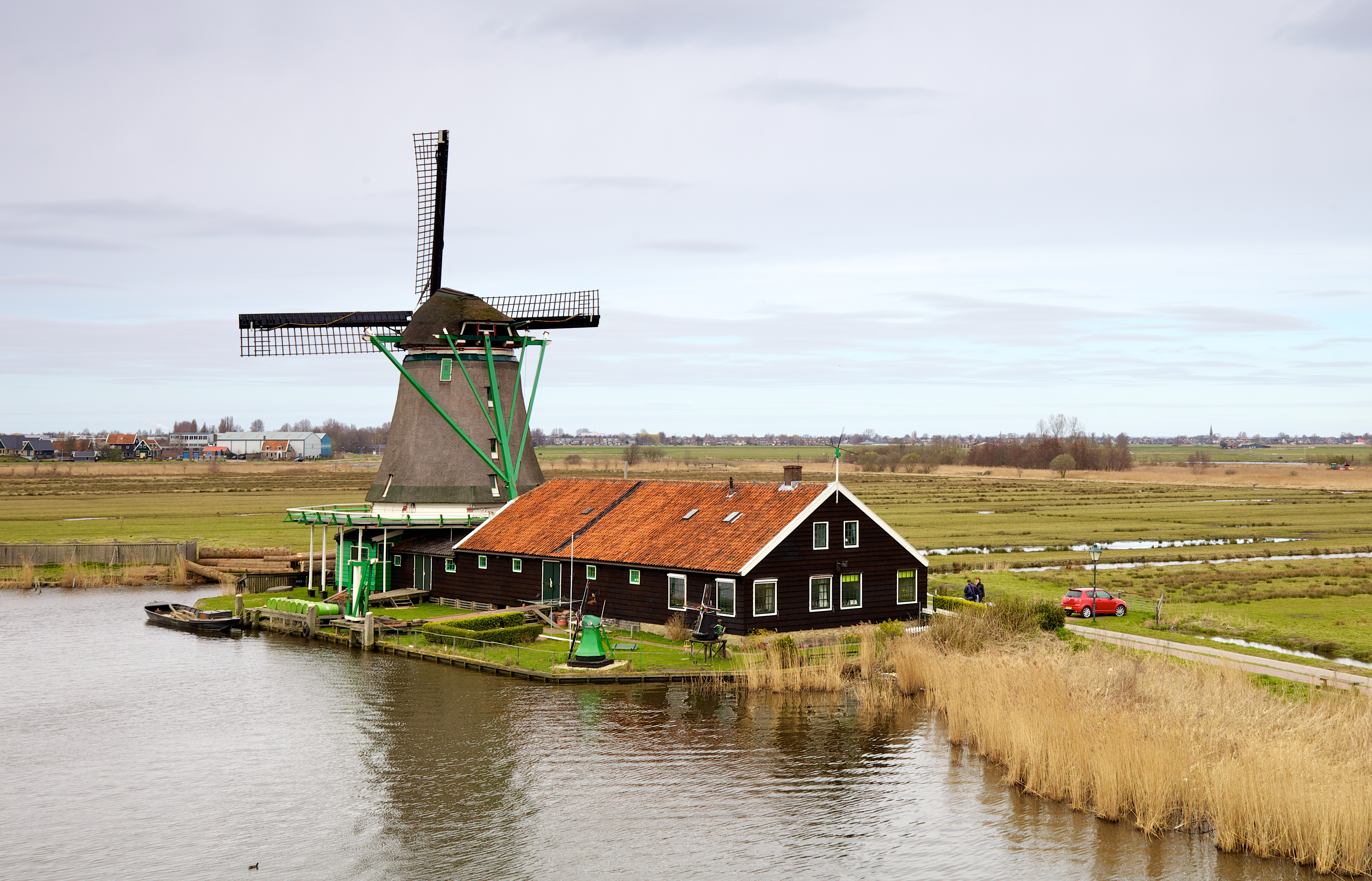
De Zoeker windmill

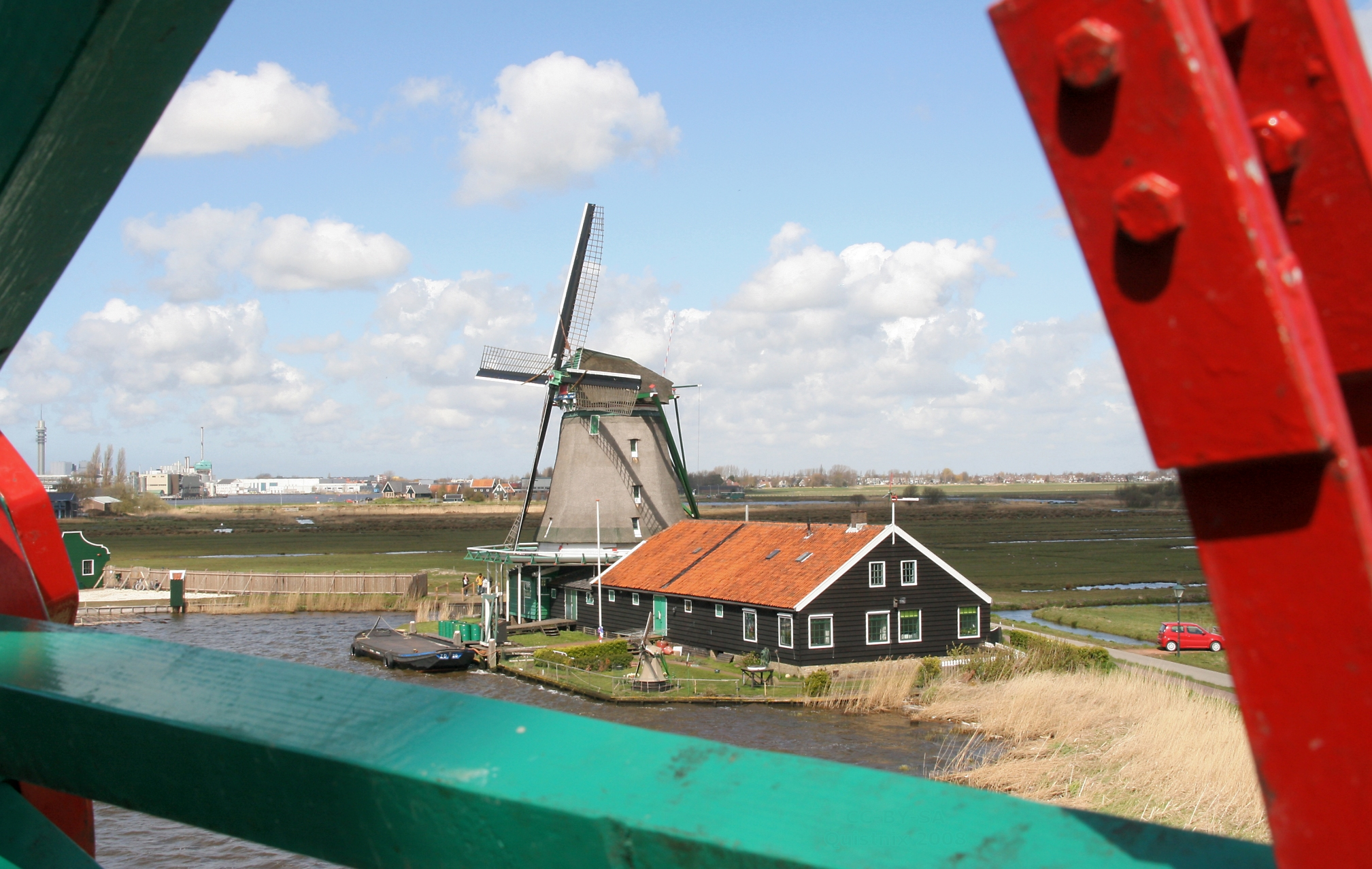
View from a bridge

De Zoeker (The Seeker) is the name of an oil windmill, located in the Zaanse Schans, Zaanstad. Its purpose is to press seeds such as linseed and rapeseed into vegetable oil. It is the only oil mill still in operation, and is one of five remaining oil mills in the area.

The mill was built in 1672 in Zaandijk. The mill continued with few interruptions until 1968, when it was moved to the Schans.

The mill is owned by the Vereniging De Zaansche Molen.

== See also ==
- De Kat, Zaandam
- De Huisman, Zaandam
- De Os, Zaandam
- De Gekroonde Poelenburg, Zaandam
- Het Jonge Schaap, Zaandam
