= Het Jonge Schaap, Zaandam =

Windmill in Zaanstad, Netherlands

Coordinates: 52.4761°N 4.8165°E

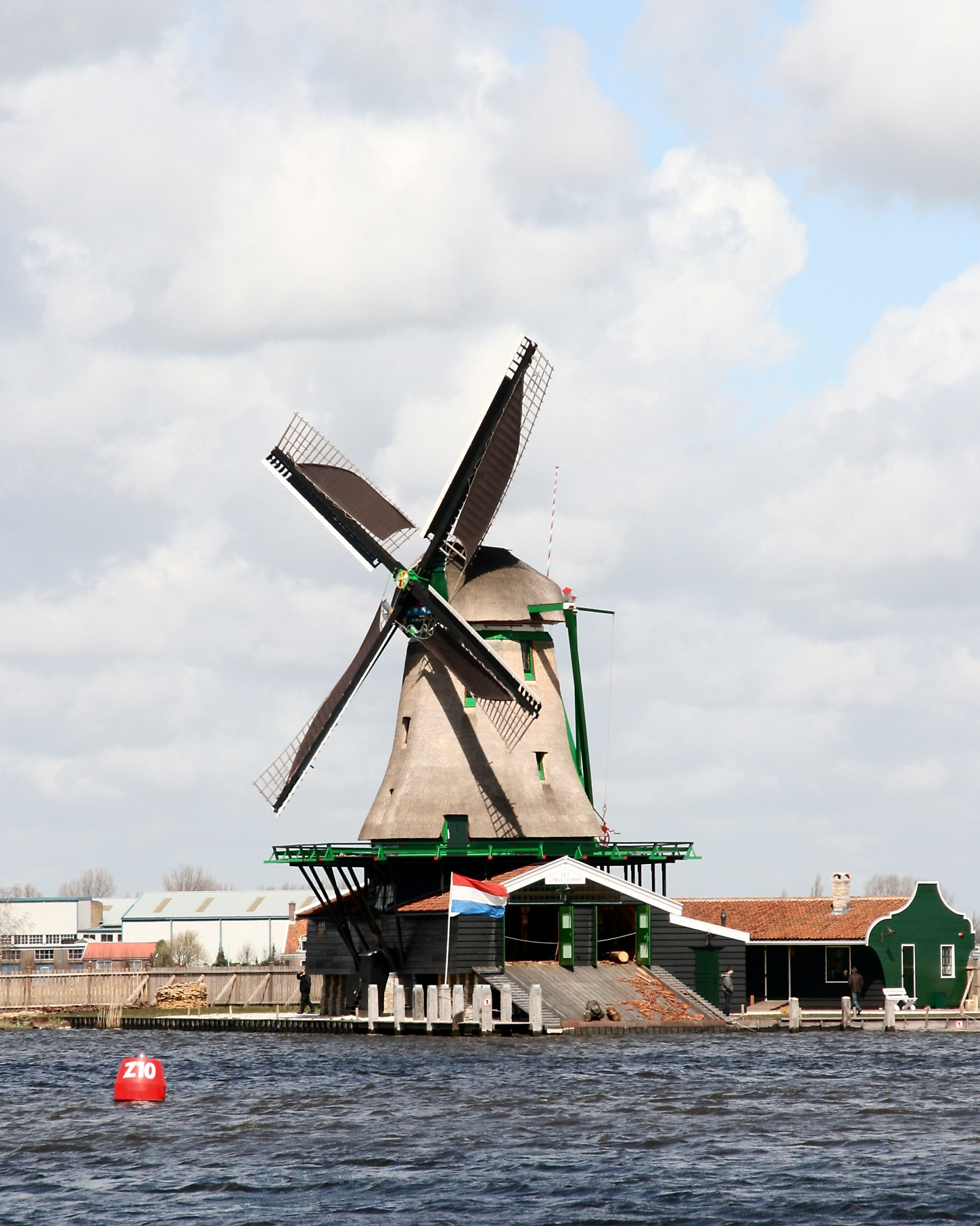
Windmill Het Jonge Schaap

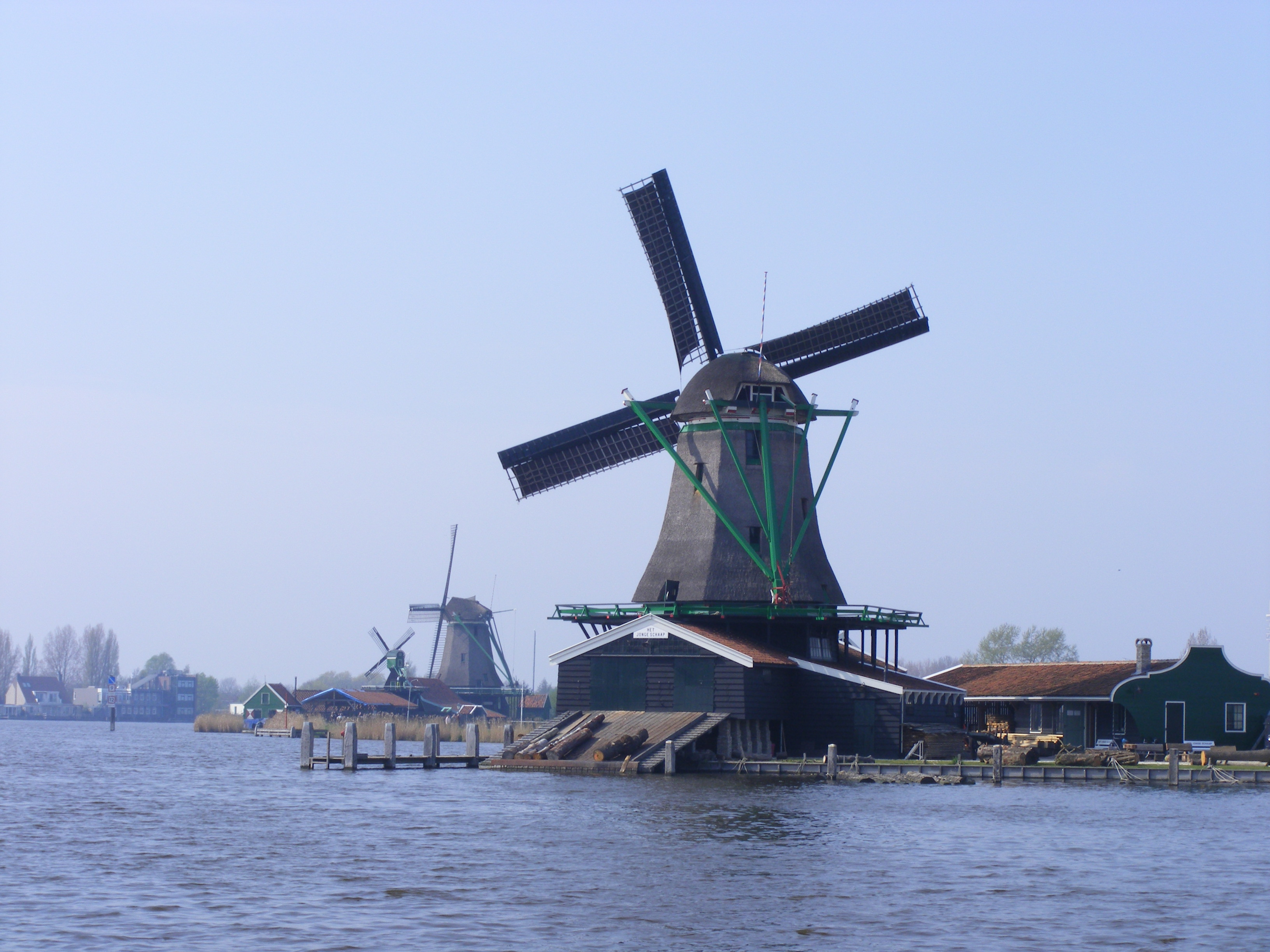
Sawmill "Het Jonge Schaap" at the Kalverringdijk

Het Jonge Schaap (Dutch pronunciation: [əˌtɕɔŋəˈsxaːp]; "The Young Sheep") is the name of a wooden wind powered sawmill, located in the Zaanse Schans, in the municipality of Zaanstad.

The original mill from 1680, located in Zaandam west of the railway along Stationsstraat, was dismantled in 1942. Between 2005 and 2007, a replica was constructed and placed between the "De Zoeker" and "De Os, Zaandam" mills at the Zaanse Schans, on the site of the former oil mill "De Ster," which operated from approximately 1685 to 1798. The replica was based on detailed drawings made by Anton Sipman before the original mill was demolished. At one time, about 109 wind-powered sawmills operated in the Zaan region, and "Het Jonge Schaap" is the last of these. It is notable as one of the eight hexagonal mills in the Netherlands and the only remaining hexagonal sawmill. The mill features three saw frames, including one for making grooves, and two capstan hoists for placing logs on the saw carriage.

On July 10, 2006, the construction of the mill's body was completed, using hexagonal posts made of larch wood from near Hannover, Germany, and the stepped base made of giant arborvitae wood (red cedar). By mid-December 2006, the structure was completed, and thatching of the hexagonal roof began. On February 26 and 27, 2007, the cap was placed, and the sails were attached. Soon after, the mill was operational, and by the summer of 2007, it was fully functional for milling. The official inauguration took place on September 27, 2007. The crankshaft, made by the Duyvis machine factory in Koog aan de Zaan, was cold-pressed into assembly using liquid nitrogen and slid into the mill just above the crank floor.

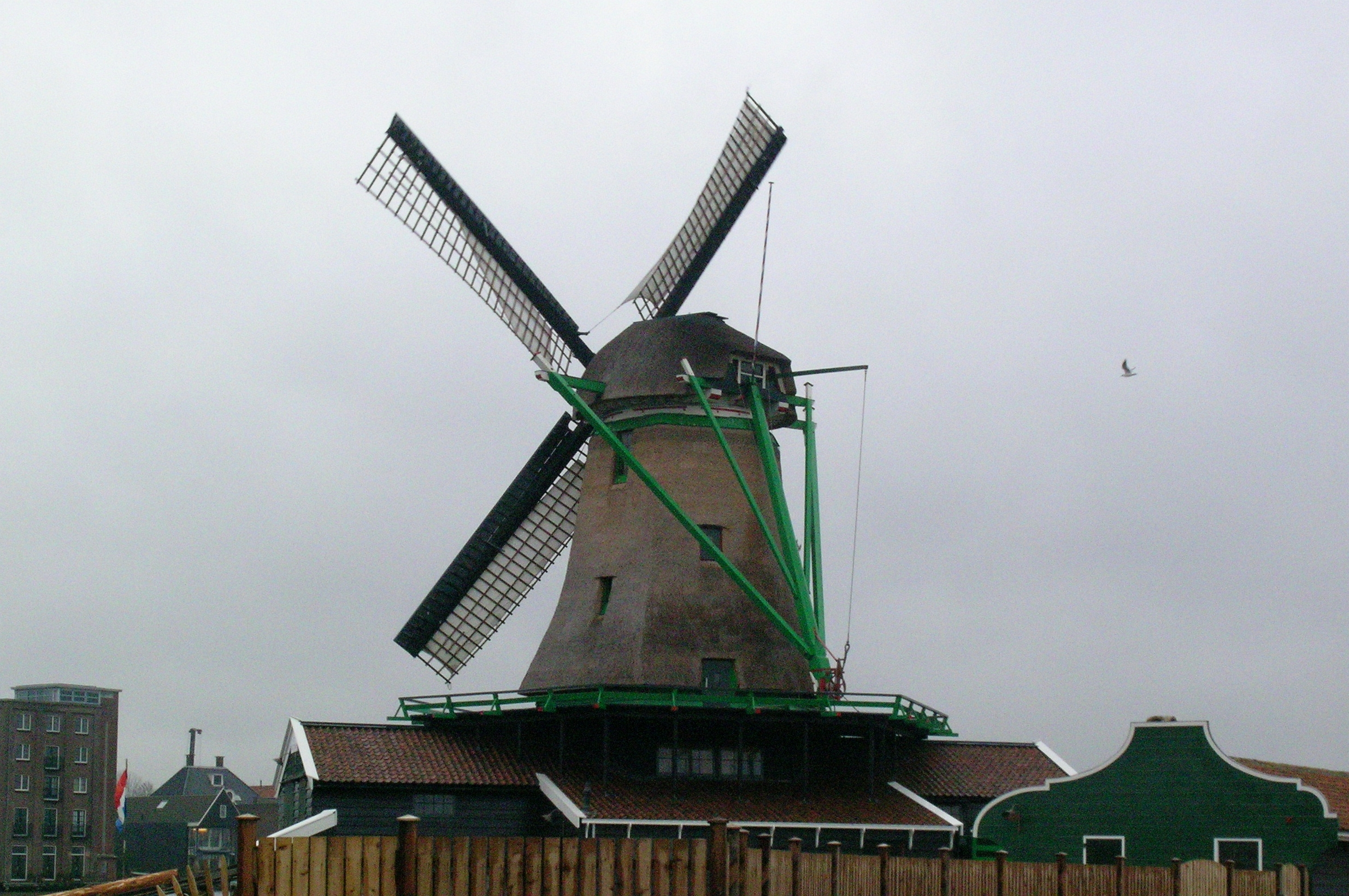
Het Jonge Schaap (November 2007)

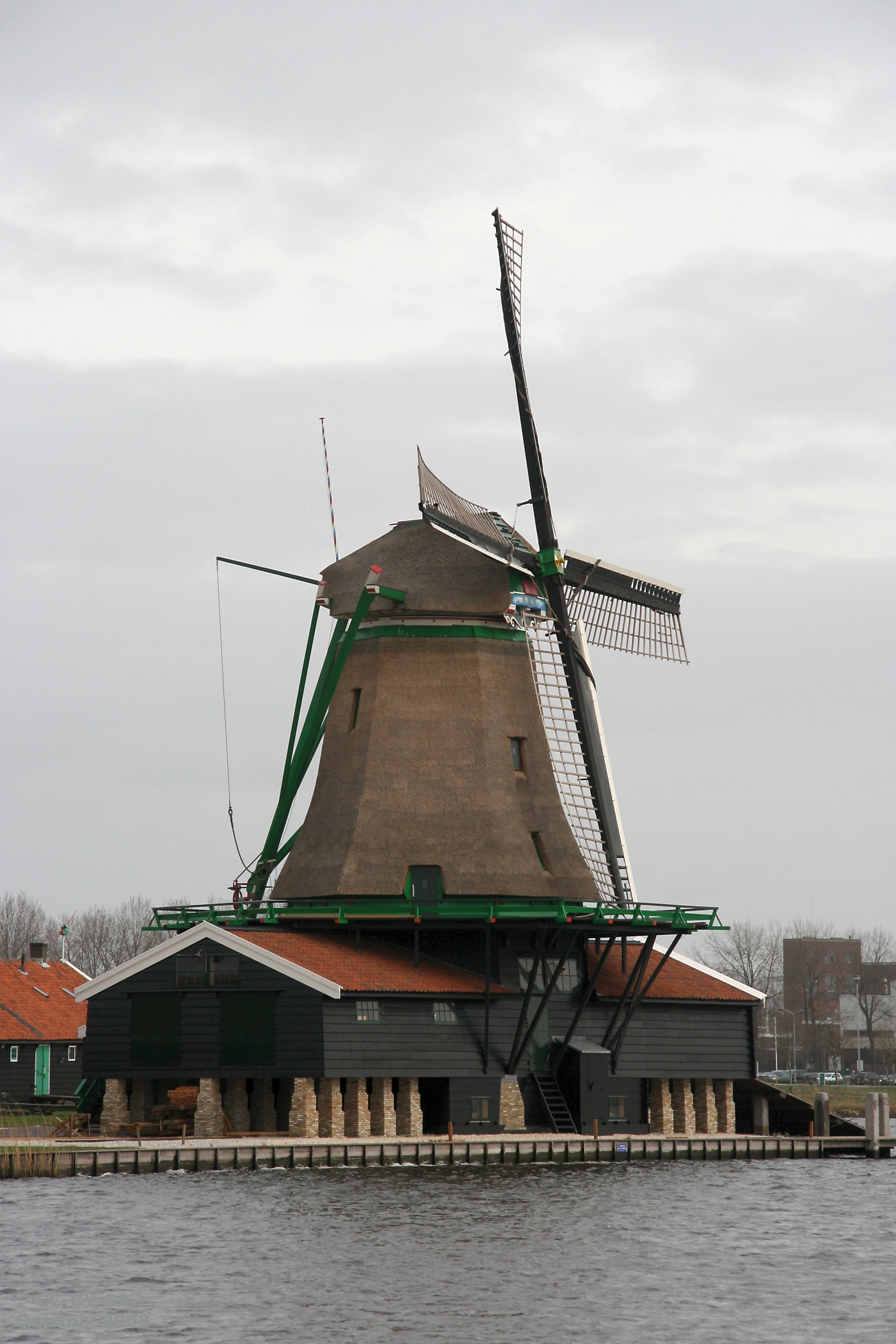
Het Jonge Schaap (maart 2008)

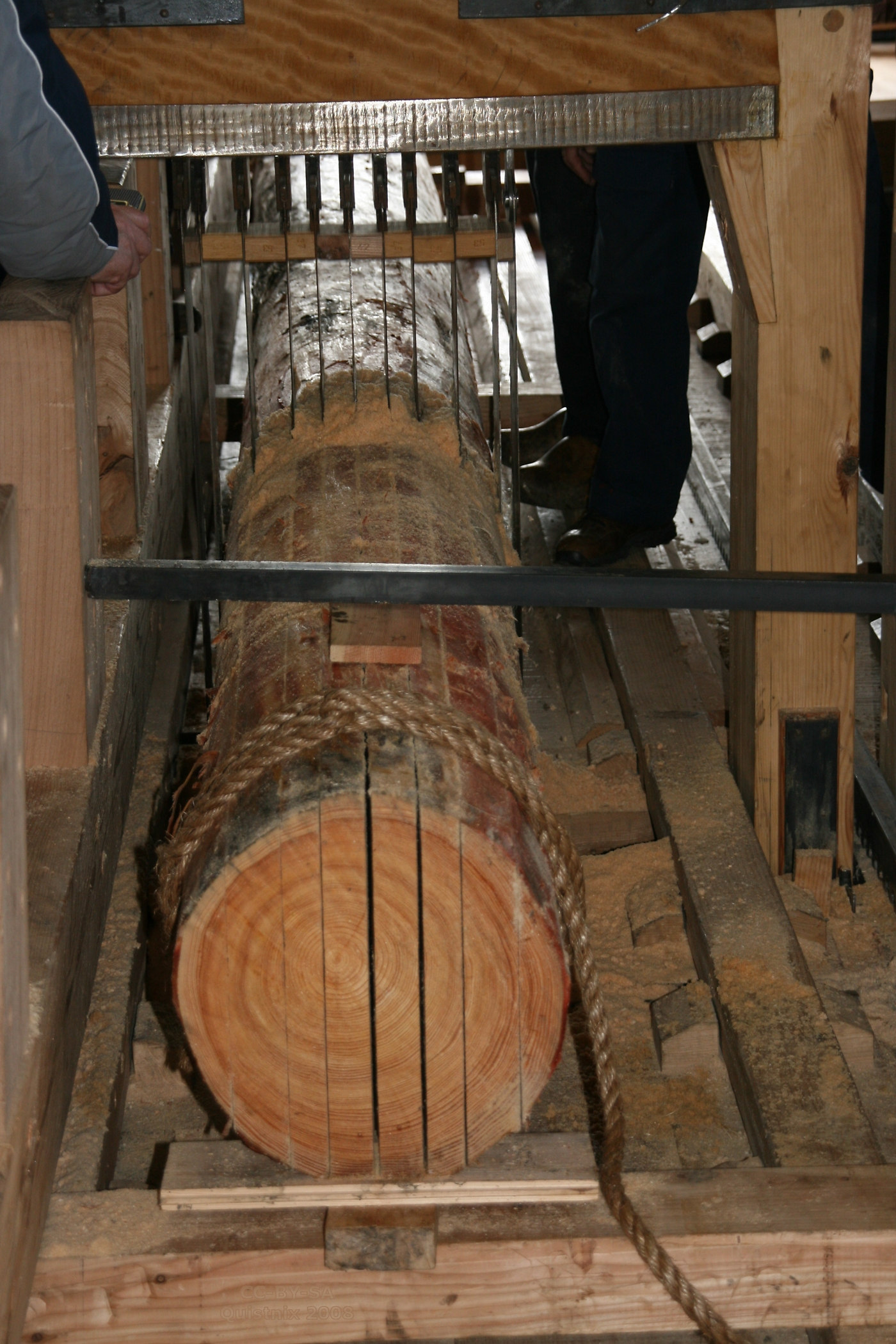
Cutting a tree trunk

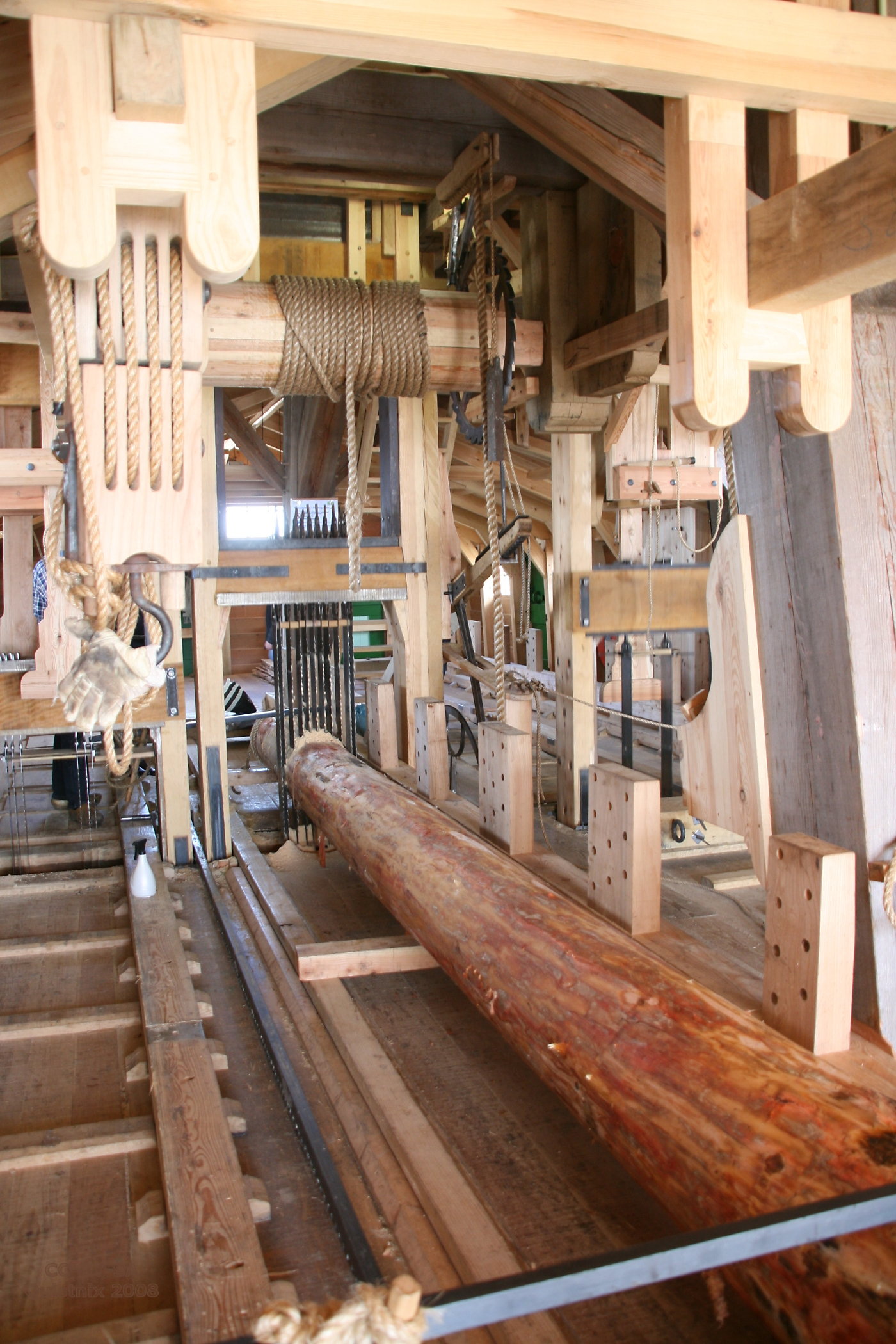
Same trunk, seen from the other side

== See also ==
- De Kat, Zaandam
- De Huisman, Zaandam
- De Os, Zaandam
- De Zoeker, Zaandam
- De Gekroonde Poelenburg, Zaandam
