= Zwaan =

Zwaan or de Zwaan or van der Zwaan is a Dutch surname. Notable people with the surname include:

- Alex van der Zwaan (born 184), Belgian-born Dutch attorney
- Bill Zwaan (born 1954), American former college football and college baseball coach
- Jaap de Zwaan (born 1949), Dutch lawyer and legal scholar
- Jan Zwaan (1925–2007), Dutch sprinter
- Jeffrey de Zwaan (born 1996), Dutch professional darts player
- Jo Zwaan (1922–2012), Dutch sprinter
- SoulJa (born Johannes Maria Leenders Zwaan, 1983), Japanese hip-hop musician and songwriter
- Peter de Zwaan (born 1944), Dutch writer
- Tine Zwaan (born 1947), Dutch former professional tennis player

== See also ==
- De Zwaan (disambiguation)
- 9691 Zwaan, a main-belt asteroid
