= De Zwaan =

De Zwaan may refer to:

- De Zwaan (restaurant), a Michelin starred restaurant in the Netherlands
- De Zwaan (windmill), a Dutch windmill in Holland, Michigan
- De Zwaan, Lienden, a windmill in Lienden, Netherlands

== See also ==
- Zwaan, a Dutch surname
