= Zaanse Schans =

- Neighbourhood of Zaandam
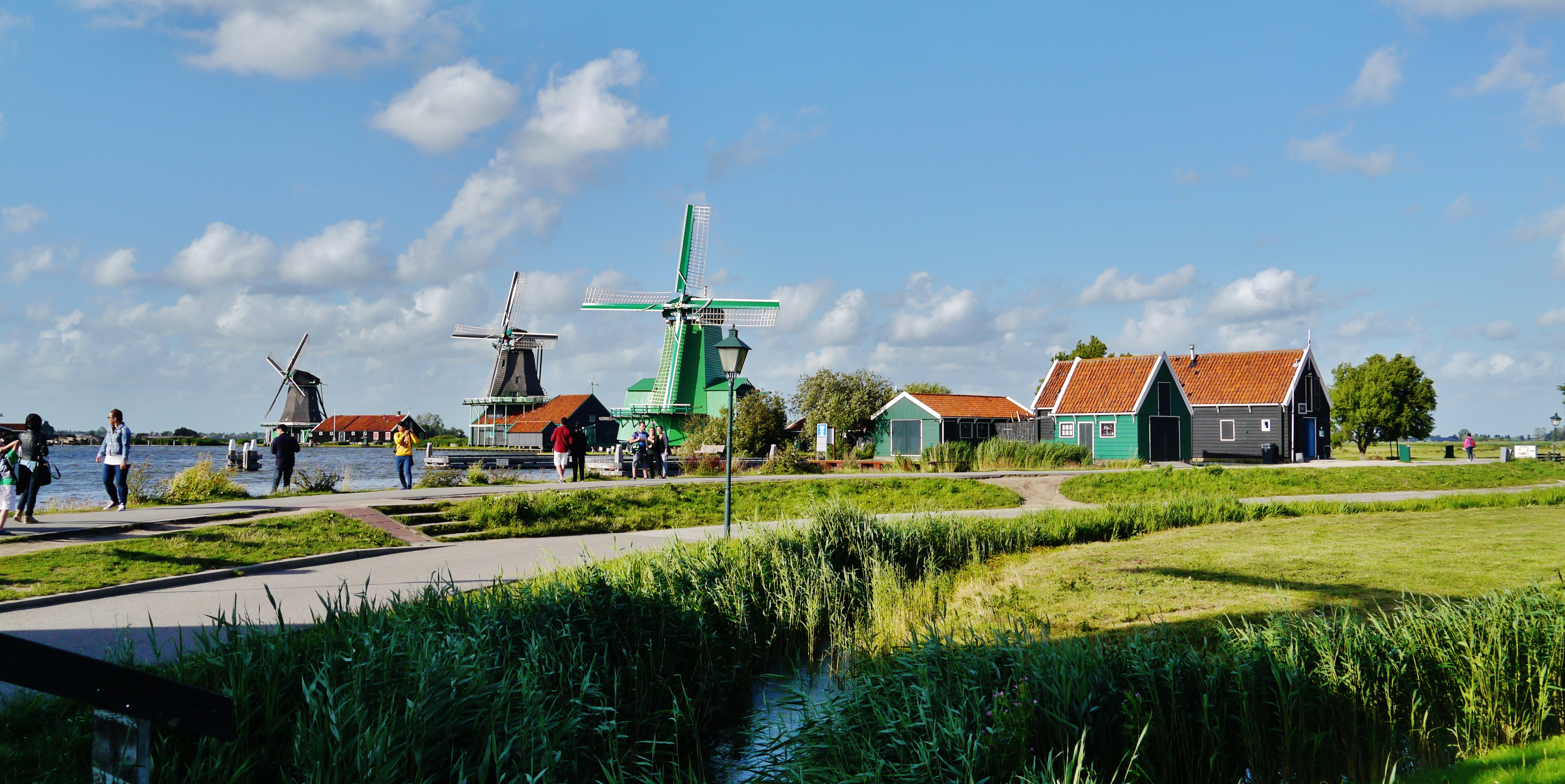
- Windmills at Zaanse Schans

- Location of Zaanse Schans in the Netherlands
- Coordinates: 52°28′26″N 4°48′59″E
- Country: Netherlands
- Province: North Holland
- Municipality: Zaanstad
- Time zone: UTC+1 (CET)
- Website: https://www.dezaanseschans.nl/en/

Zaanse Schans (Dutch pronunciation: [ˈzaːnsə ˈsxɑns]) is a neighbourhood of Zaandam, near Zaandijk, Netherlands. It is best known for its collection of historic windmills and wooden houses that were relocated here from the wider region north of Amsterdam for preservation. From 1961 to 1974, old buildings from all over the region known as the Zaanstreek were relocated using lowboy trailers to Zaanse Schans. Two of the windmills in Zaanse Schans are preserved on their original site where they were first constructed, and therefore do not constitute part of the relocated structures. The Zaans Museum, established in 1994, near the first Zaanse Schans windmill, is located south of the neighbourhood. This architectural reserve for Zaanse timber construction is a protected village scene because of its architectural-historical and landscape value. It developed into an international tourist destination with several million visitors every year: in 2024, there were 2.6 million.

== Etymology and history ==
Zaanse Schans derived its name from the river Zaan and its original function as sconce (schans in Dutch) against the Spanish troops during the Eighty Years' War of Dutch independence.

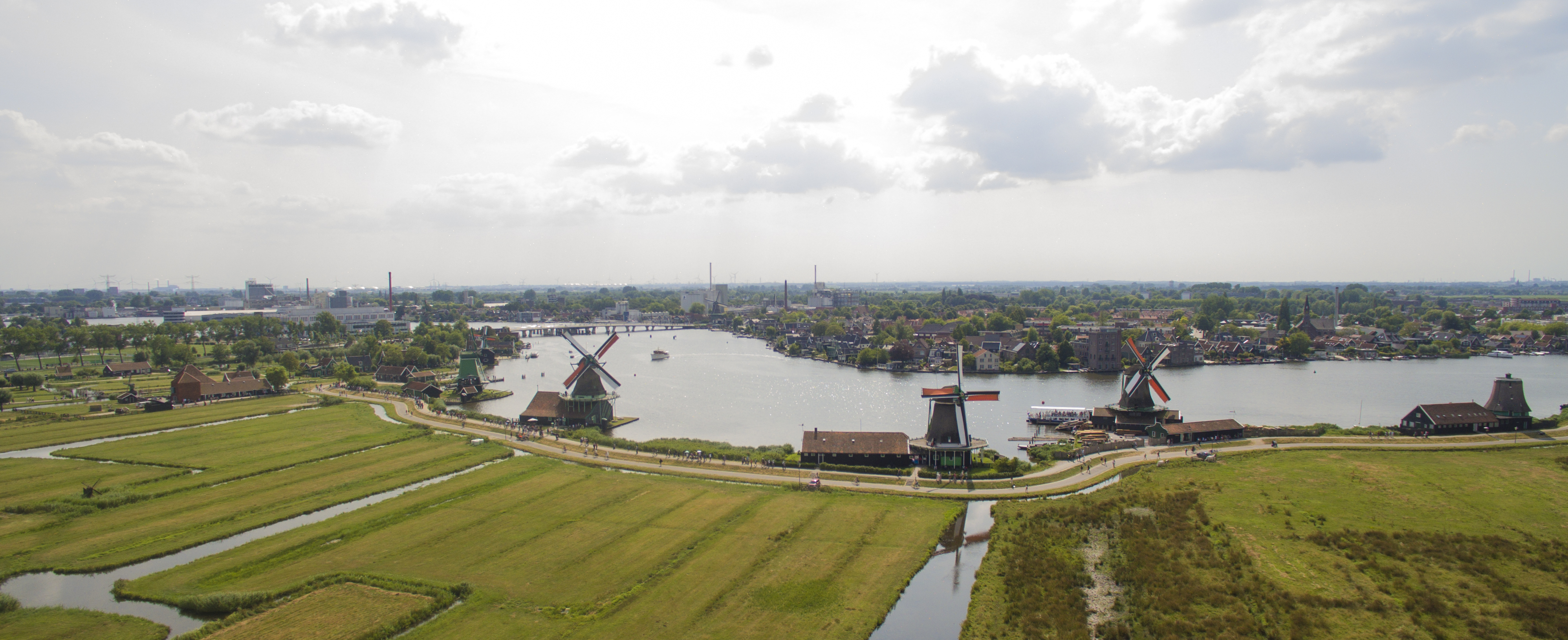
Aerial view of Zaanse Schans

== Attractions ==
Zaanse Schans is a popular tourist attraction and an anchor point of the European Route of Industrial Heritage (ERIH). The neighbourhood attracts lots of visitors yearly. It is served by Zaandijk Zaanse Schans railway station, 18 minutes away from Amsterdam Centraal station.

The Zaanse Schans is a mix of inhabited homes, businesses, museums and windmills. The outside area of the Zaanse Schans is free to visit and many locations, like the Cheese Factory, Wooden Shoe Workshop, Bakery Museum and Pewter Foundry are free to visit, as well as many shops. About 80% of all inside locations are free to visit. The windmills and the museums do charge an entrance fee or participate in an all-in card. This card is not mandatory to visit the Zaanse Schans area.

== List of windmills ==
Windmills

The windmills were built after 1574.

- De Huisman (The Houseman), a mustardmill
- De Gekroonde Poelenburg (The Crowned Poelenburg), a sawmill
- De Kat (The Cat), a dyemill
- Het Jonge Schaap (The Young Sheep), a sawmill
- De Os (The Ox), an oilmill
- De Zoeker (The Seeker), an oilmill
- Het Klaverblad (The Cloverleaf), a sawmill
- De Bonte Hen (The Spotted Hen), an oilmill
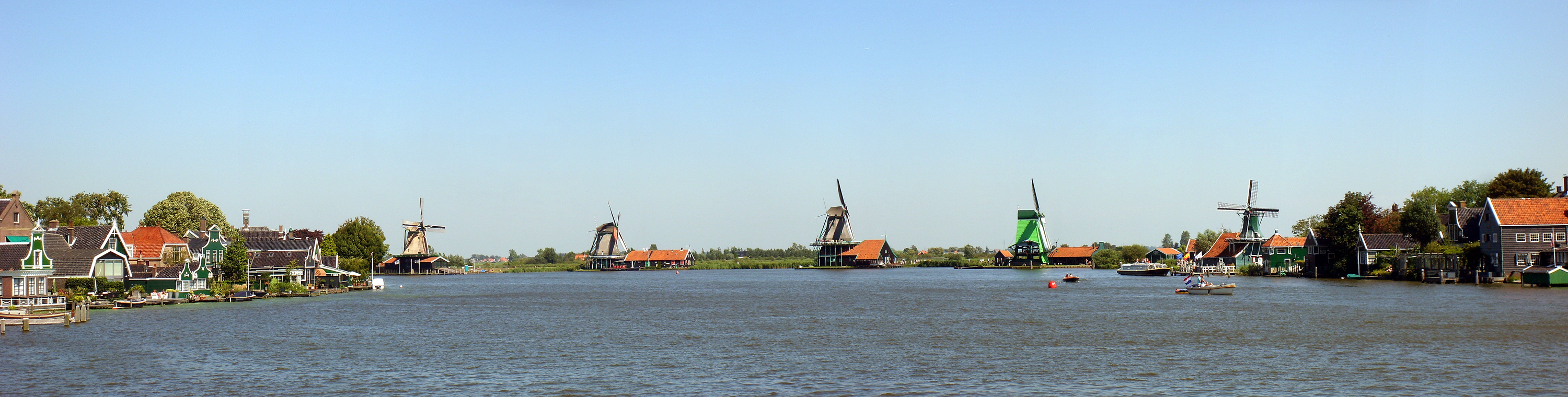
Names of the mills from left to right: Het Jonge Schaap ("The Young Sheep"), De Zoeker ("The Seeker"), De Kat ("The Cat"), De Gekroonde Poelenburg ("The Crowned Poelenburg") and De Huisman ("The Houseman").

== See also ==
- Wind pump
- Kinderdijk windmills
