= Oil mill =

Type of grinding mill

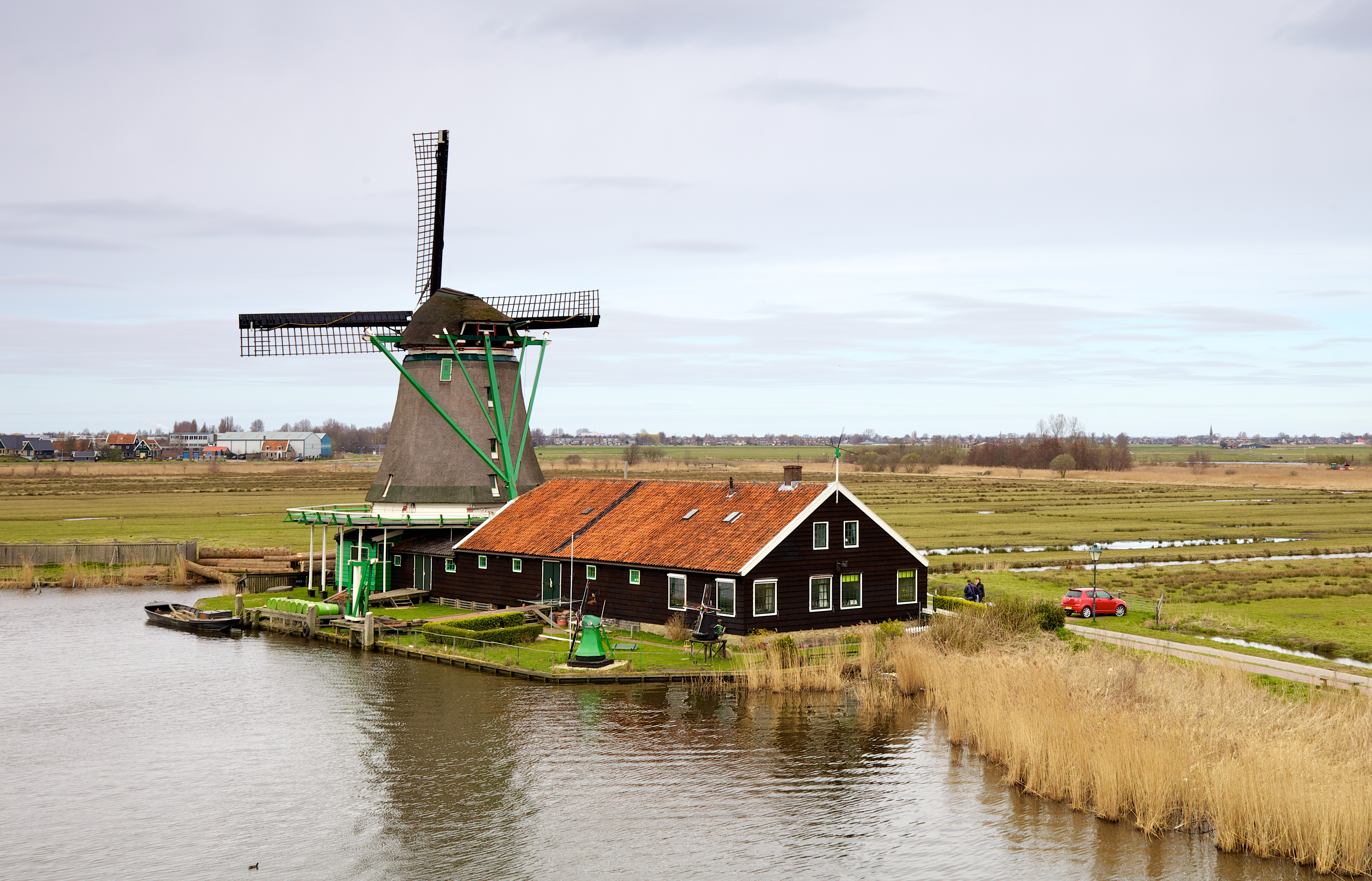
De Zoeker (The Seeker), an oil windmill in the Zaanse Schans, in the Netherlands

An oil mill is a grinding mill designed to crush or bruise oil-bearing seeds, such as linseed or peanuts, or other oil-rich vegetable material, such as olives or the fruit of the oil palm, which can then be pressed to extract vegetable oils, which may be used as foods or for cooking, as oleochemical feedstocks, as lubricants, or as biofuels. The pomace or press cake – the remaining solid material from which the oil has been extracted – may also be used as a food or fertilizer.

== History ==
Oil-rich vegetable materials have been processed mechanically to extract the valuable oils for thousands of years, typically using vertical millstones moving around a central post (edge runner stones or kollergangs in an edge mill) to crush or bruise the seeds or fruit which can then be stamped or pressed to extract the oil. A treadmill, windmill or watermill was later used to drive the milling and pressing machinery, replaced in modern times with steam and later other power sources. Ox- or horse-driven oil mills, such as the traditional ghani in Bangladesh, have increasingly been replaced by power-driven steel oil mills.

Ox-driven oil mill in Bangladesh

In some areas, watermills may be "double" water mills, with machinery for grinding wheat on one side of the watercourse and machinery for extracting oils on the other side.

Historical wind-driven oil mills could process between 100 and 200 tons of raw materials per year.

=== Olive oil mills ===
In the Mediterranean region, a traditional form of oil mill known in Hebrew as a beit bad (בית בד) was used specifically for the production of olive oil. Ancient olive oil mills typically consisted of a large stone basin and a rotating millstone used to crush olives into a paste, often powered by humans or draft animals. After crushing, the olive paste was placed in woven fiber baskets and pressed using wooden beam presses or screw presses. The extracted liquid, containing both oil and vegetable water, was collected in settling pits, where the oil naturally separated and was skimmed off. The remaining solid residue, known as pomace, was commonly reused as fuel or animal feed.

Archaeological remains of olive oil mills have been found throughout the Levant and the Mediterranean basin, indicating the central economic and cultural role of olive oil production from antiquity through the medieval period. Many of the basic principles of these early systems continue to be used in modern olive oil mills, although the processes are now fully mechanized and rely on centrifugal separation rather than beam pressing.

== Modern oil mills ==
Modern mechanical oil mills can process up to 4,000 tons per day in hot pressing processes, and up to 25 tons per day cold pressed. Industrial oil pressing methods usually use a screw to crush the raw materials in a continuous process, before extraction of the oil from the press cake using a centrifuge or a solvent such as hexane.

Edible oils may be extracted for culinary purposes. Non-edible oils can be used in the manufacture of soaps through saponification, biodiesel production, paints and varnishes, or as fuel for oil lamps. Important feed stocks include soybeans, rapeseed (canola), sunflower seeds, cottonseed, and maize (corn), as well as peanuts, olives, various nuts, sesame seeds, safflower, grape seeds, flaxseed (linseed), and Mustard oil. Palm oil is extracted from the pulp of the oil palm fruit, palm kernel oil from the kernel of the oil palm, and coconut oil from the kernel of the coconut.

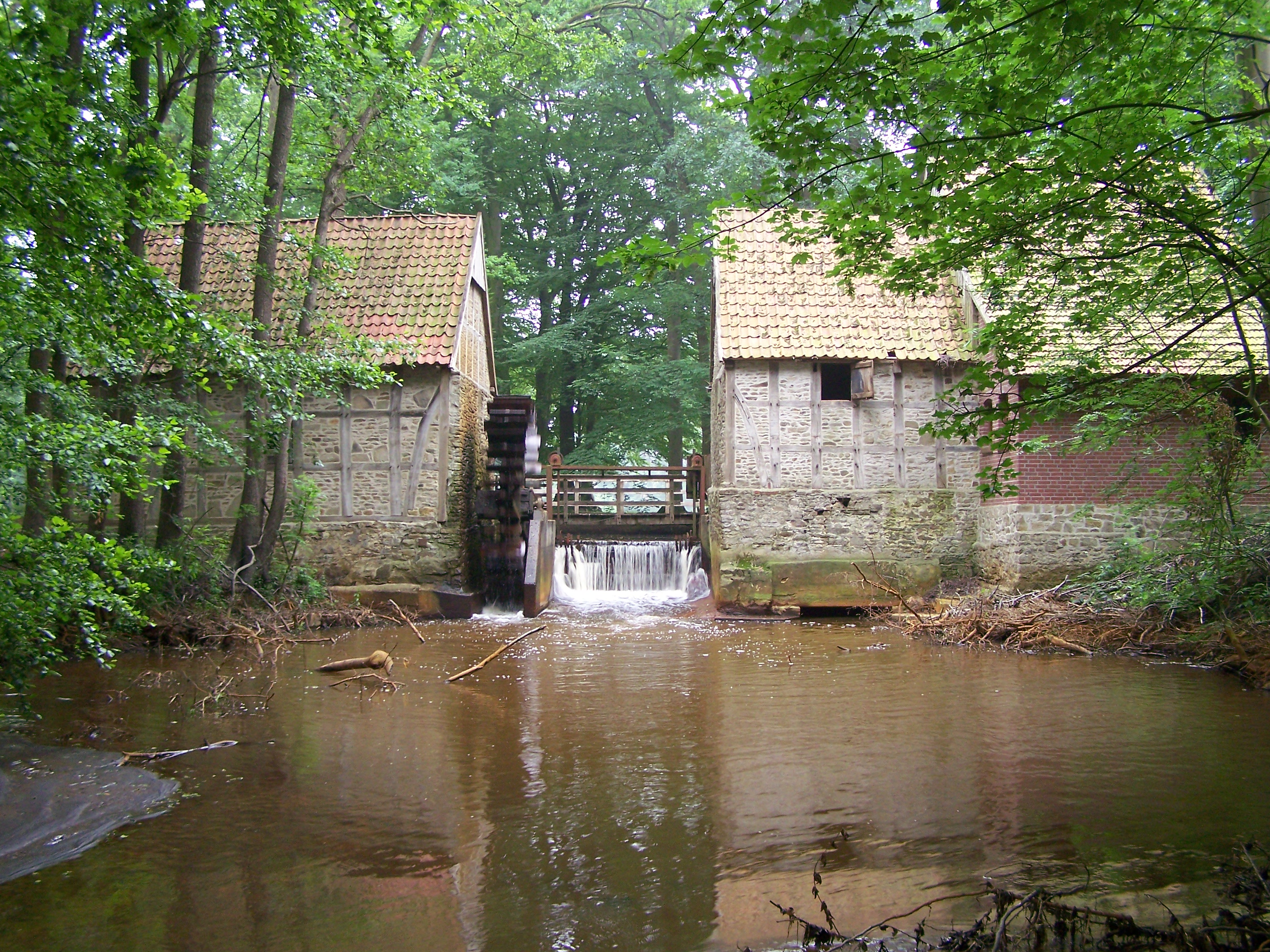
Double watermill with separate machinery producing oil and flour at Hopsten in Germany

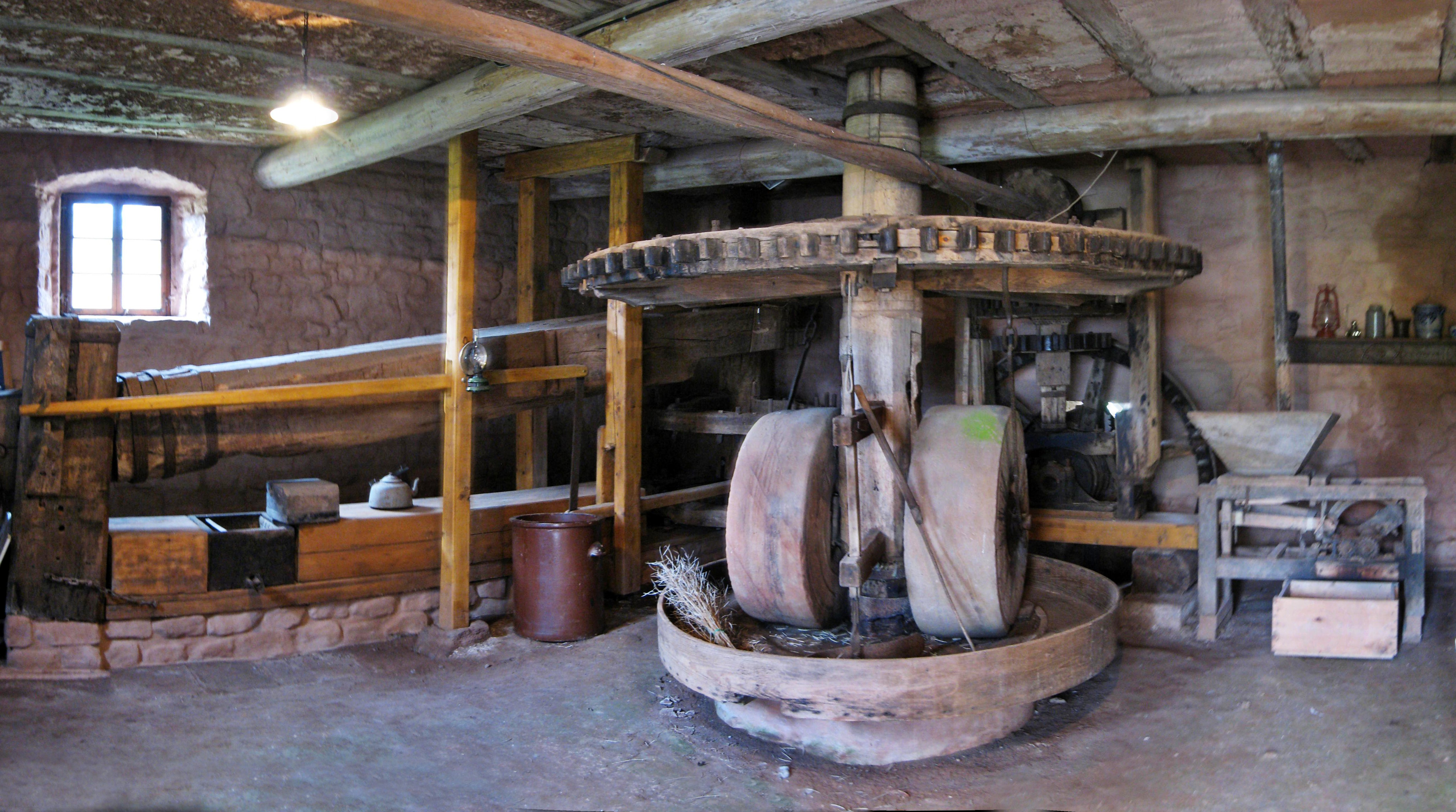
Edge mill at an oil mill at Heusweiler, in Germany

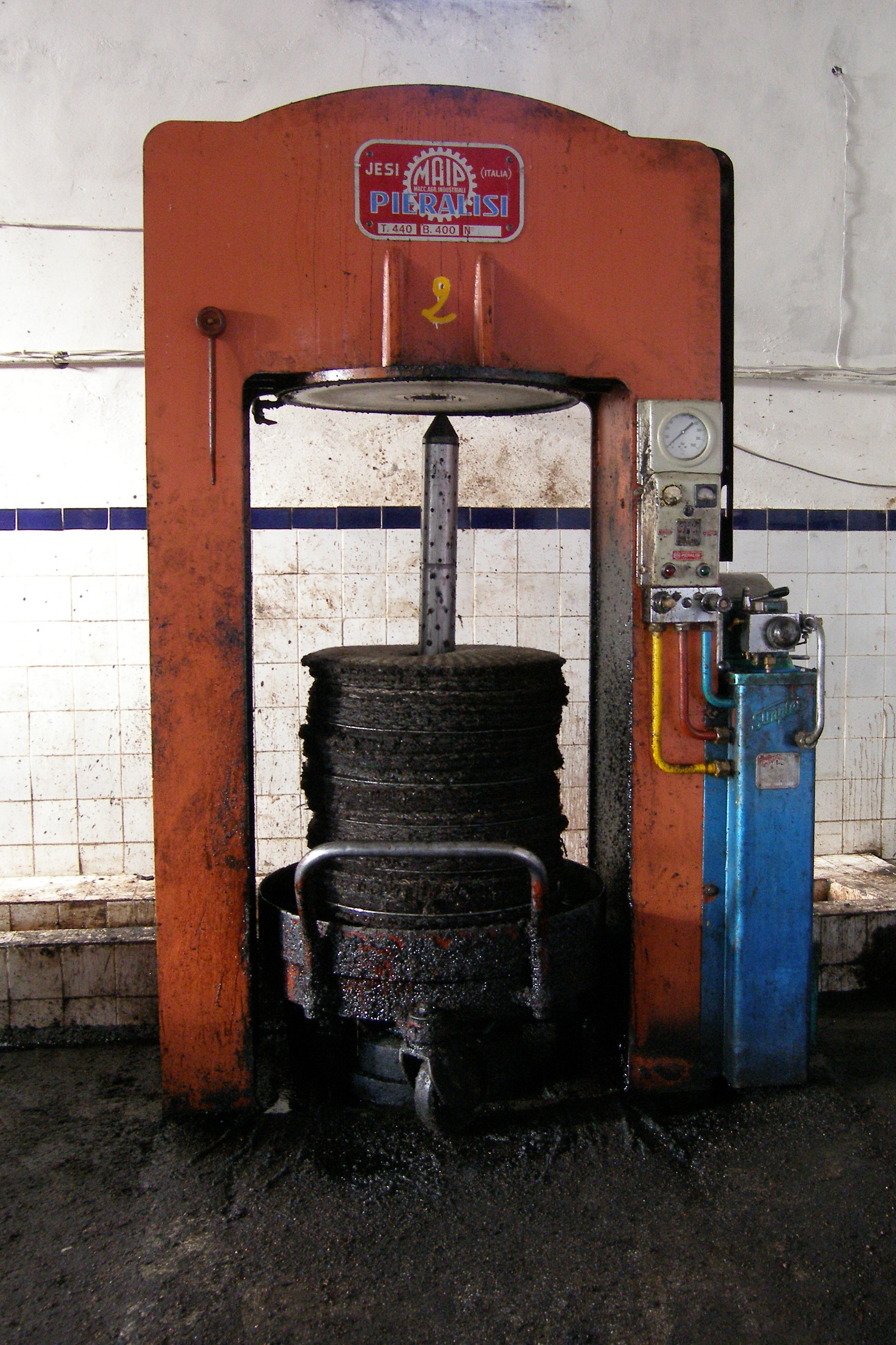
Olive oil press

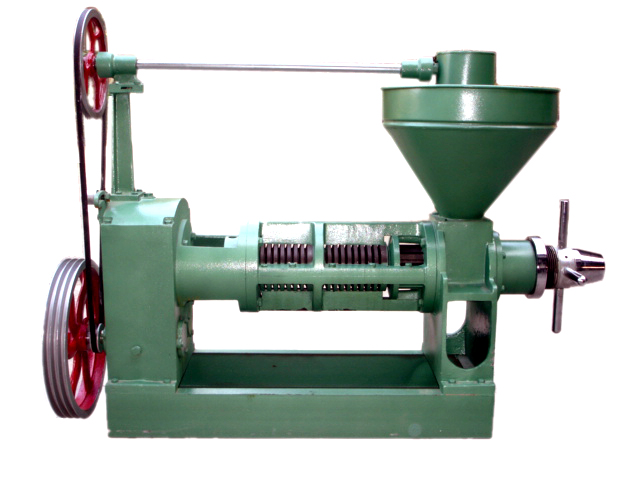
Expeller press

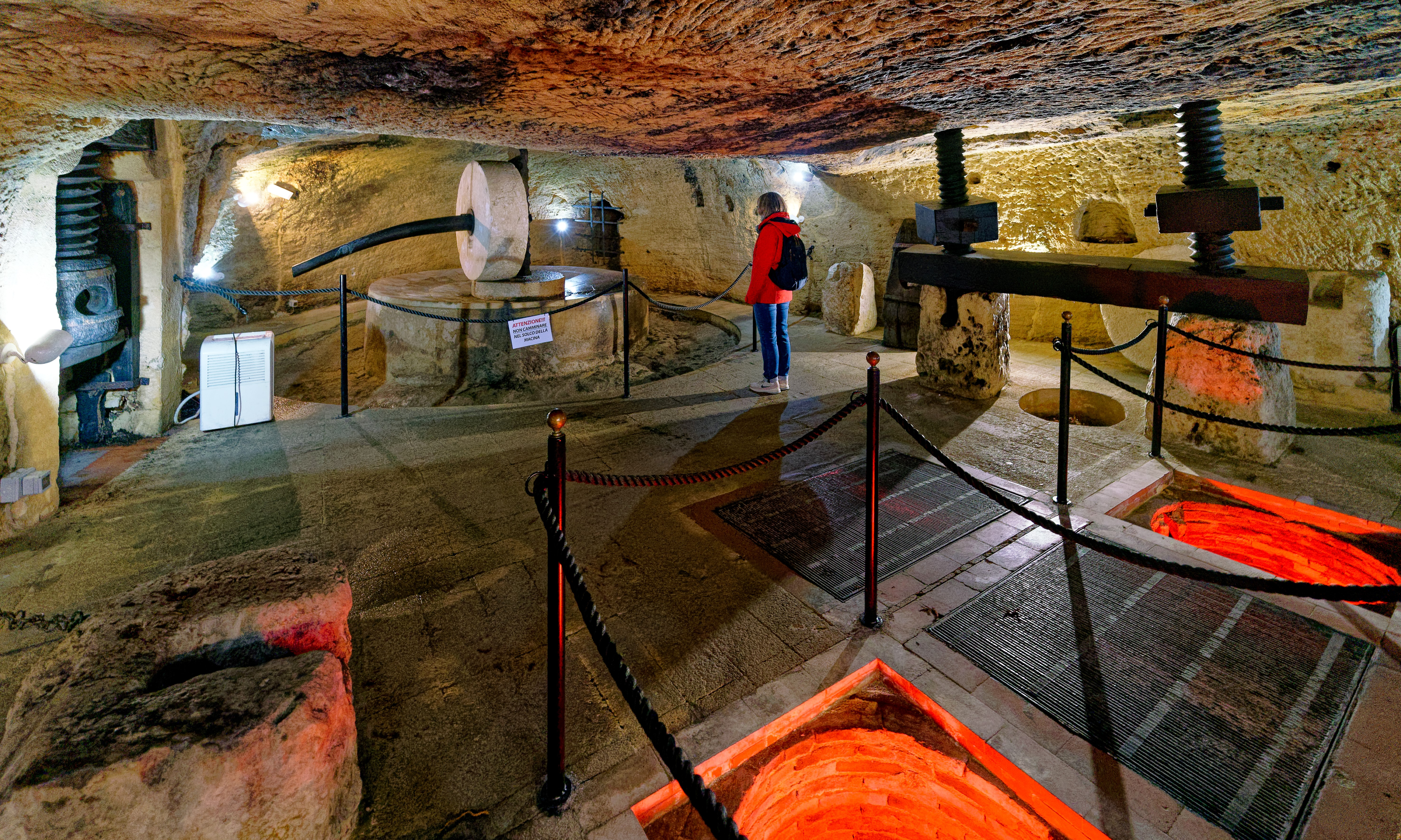
Historic mill for lamp oil in Gallipoli

== See also ==
- Olive oil extraction
- Oil pressure
