= De Gekroonde Poelenburg =

Paltrok mill in Zaandam, Netherlands

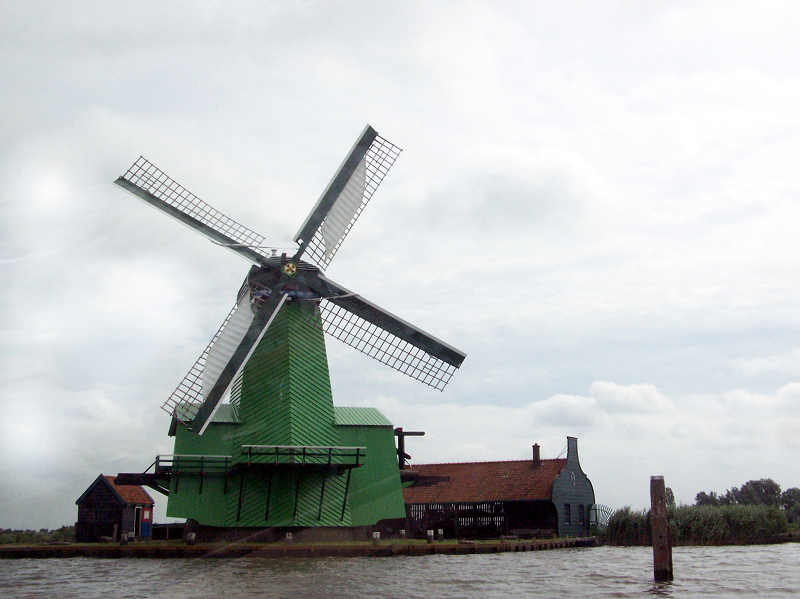
- De Gekroonde Poelenburg, 2007
- Interactive map of De Gekroonde Poelenburg

Origin
- Mill name: De Gekroonde Poelenburg
- Mill location: Kalverringdijk 27 1509 BT Zaandam
- Coordinates: 52.474206°N 4.817616°E
- Operator: Vereniging De Zaansche Molen
- Year built: 1869 (1904/1963)

Information
- Purpose: Sawmill
- Type: Paltrok mill
- No. of sails: Four sails
- Type of sails: Common sails
- Windshaft: Cast iron
- Winding: Tailpole and winch
- Other information: Three vertical frame saws

De Gekroonde Poelenburg (The Crowned Poelenburg) is a paltrok mill in Zaandam, Netherlands which has been restored to working order. Like all Dutch paltrok mills it is a wind-powered sawmill. The mill is listed as a Rijksmonument, number 40093. It is located at the Zaanse Schans in a group of several historic industrial windmills.

== History ==
The history of De Gekroonde Poelenburg is rather complicated involving several distinct windmills. The first windmill on the original location of the first De Poelenburg in Zaandam-Oost was mentioned in 1733. It was named after its owner Pieter Jochemsz. Poelenburg. This mill burned down in 1903 and was replaced by a windmill from Koog aan de Zaan called De Locomotief (The Locomotive) which was renamed to De Gekroonde Poelenburg after the move. De Locomotief was newly built in Koog aan de Zaan in 1867 to replace the 200-year-old De Groene Jager (The Green Hunter) that had to be dismantled for the construction of a railway line by the HSM. Hence the name of the new mill. De Gekroonde Poelenburg, formerly De Locomotief, was working until 1950 after which it fell into disrepair. It was acquired by Vereniging De Zaansche Molen and moved to the Zaanse Schans in 1963. It was re-erected at the site of pealing windmill De Grootvorst that had burned down in 1928. The restored mill turned out to be very hard to wind and attempts to use this mill commercially were abandoned in 1966. Since then it is operated by volunteers. The winding problem was solved years later. In hindsight a misunderstanding on the weight distribution of paltrok mills may have caused the problem. It is now known that most of the weight should be carried by the central post and not evenly divided between post and roller ring (see below). Another misunderstanding was put right in 2005 when the black tar coating of 1963 was replaced by the original bright green paint.

== Description ==
De Gekroonde Poelenburg is a Dutch paltrok mill - a wooden mill supported on a short central post and a ring of wooden rollers on a low brick base and designed specifically for sawing wood. The mill body is boarded, however the sawing floor is open on three sides with only the windward facing side and the side roofs giving protection against the weather. The entire mill is winded by a tailpole and winch. On the front is a stage, 3.0 metres (9 ft 10 in) above ground for setting the sails. The sails are common sails with a span of 20.3 metres (66 ft 7 in). They are carried on a cast-iron windshaft cast by foundry De Prins van Oranje as number 0430 in 1866. The brake wheel with 66 cogs on the wind shaft drives the crank wheel with 26 radial cogs on the horizontal crank shaft. There is no upright shaft. The crank shaft has three crank pins. Connecting rods from the crank pins drive the three frame saws. Reciprocating lever bars also drive the pawl and ratchet mechanisms which in turn drive the winches and the feeding mechanism of the log carriages through rack and pinion mechanisms. The winches can be used with the log hoist to lift logs from the water onto the sawing platform and to pull the log carriages back to their starting position.

== Public access ==
The Crowned Poelenburg is not open to the public due to safety concerns.
