= Marshalls Broadcasting Company =

National broadcaster of the Marshall Islands

The Marshalls Broadcasting Company (MBC) is the national broadcaster of the Marshall Islands. It operates one radio station, V7AB (AM 1098, FM 97.9) and one television channel (MBC TV).

MBC is owned by Robert Reimers Enterprises, a local conglomerate. The TV service is available only in Majuro, but not in the outer islands; it competes with MHTV, operated by the National Telecommunications Authority.

== History ==
The television station traces its origins back to April 15, 1975, with the launch of the Pacific Communications Company (PCC). PCC was a subscription cable television operator and was managed by Kitly Pinho. The aim was to obtain 600 subscribers by the end of 1976. A similar system was also introduced to Ebeye in the same year of its launch. Influenced by the commercials seen on the tapes, new products such as Ruffles were introduced to Majuro.

PCC received its tapes from Honolulu and were freighted to Majuro from Air Micronesia.

PCC operated until 1979, when storm surges from a hurricane washed much of the installed cable. The Marshalls Broadcasting Company took over its operations shortly afterwards.

In 1990, MBC TV broadcast 10–12 hours on Mondays to Thursdays and on Sundays and 14 hours on Fridays and Saturdays. Programming was taped from Hawaiian television stations from a base in Kealakekua and later sent to Majuro on a one-week delay. The service was broadcast over-the-air under a high subscription cost for a decoder (US$125) with a monthly subscription fee of US$20. It was expected that MBC would leave the existing system and adopt a cable system under an agreement with UMDA, who installed Island Cable TV in Palau. The coverage area of MBC TV was limited to Majuro at the time. MBC subsequently initiated a conversion to an all-cable network in 1992, with equipment due for August that year. It was expected to have twelve channels. The service was operational by September, according to Victor Milne; coverage went from Rita to Majuro Bridge.

MBC was temporarily taken off the air at the beginning of 1994 as the staff took a New Year vacation.

As of 2000, MBC TV was a cable service providing CNN, Discovery Channel, live sports and US networks. It also has an agreement with Palau-based Oceania Television Network, alongside the National Telecommunications Authority's cable service. In 2009, local content was being shown on channel 18 of the system.

== See also ==
- Majuro Educational Television, TV station owned by the Alele Museum & Public Library
