= Communications in the Marshall Islands =

The Marshall Islands is an island country in Oceania.

In 2010, the Majuro and Kwajalein Atoll were connected to the HANTRU-1 undersea communications cable to provide high-speed bandwidth. Faster internet service was rolled out to Majuro and Ebeye on April 1, 2010.

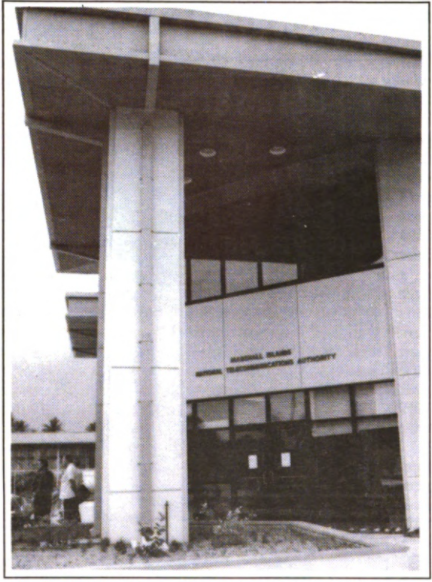
National Telecommunications Authority building

The majority of communication is under the responsibility of Marshall Islands National Telecommunications Authority.

== Publications ==
Newspapers:

- The Marshall Islands Journal: tabloid
  - The Marshall Islands Journal is a dual language, once a week publication. It is the newspaper of record for the Marshall Islands.

== Telephone ==
Telephones:

- main lines in use: 3,000 (1994)
- mobile cellular: 280 (1994)

Telex services:

- domestic: Majuro Atoll and Ebeye and Kwajalein islands have regular, seven-digit, direct-dial telephones; other islands interconnected by shortwave radio, telephone (used mostly for government purposes)
- international: satellite earth stations – 2 Intelsat (Pacific Ocean); US Government satellite communications system on Kwajalein

== Radio ==
Radio broadcast stations: AM 3, FM 4, shortwave 0 (1998)

Stations included are:

- V7AB 1098 (State-run, by Marshalls Broadcasting Company, national coverage)
- V7AFN 1224 Kwajalein (military, NPR)
- V7EG 1170 Micronesia Heatwave (commercial) (formerly V7RR AM 1557)
- V7?? 90.7
- V7EMON 95.5
- V7AB 97.9
- V7EG 99.9 Delap, Majuro (Eagle Christian Radio)
- V7DJ 101.1 Kwajalein (military, Active Rock)
- AFN 102.1 Kwajalein (military, Hot AC)
- V7AA 104.1 - Religious
- V7WU 105.0

== Television ==
Broadcast stations:

- MBC-TV
- CPN (AFN) – Central Pacific Network (Channel 1)
- CPN (AFN) – Central Pacific Network (Channel 2)

Several Honolulu local stations are available on cable (converted from ATSC to DVB-T): KHET (PBS), KHON-TV (Fox), KITV-TV (ABC), KHNL-TV (NBC) and KGMB-TV (CBS).

Televisions: NA

== Internet ==
Internet Service Providers: 1

Top level domain: The TLD of the Marshall Islands is .mh. However, its registrar has been essentially defunct, with their website not resolving.
