= 1098 AM =

AM radio frequency

The following radio stations broadcast on AM frequency 1098 kHz.

== China ==
- CNR Tibetan Radio in Beijing and Golmud
- CNR Uyghur Radio in Beijing

== Taiwan ==
- Radio Taiwan International

== Greece ==
- "AMAX-385" at Athens (transmits AM stereo)

== Japan ==
- JOSR at Nagano, Nagano
- JOSW at Iida, Nagano (A repeater of JOSR)
  - No callsign at Ina, Nagano (A repeater of JOSR)
- JOWO at Kōriyama, Fukushima (A repeater of JOWR (Radio Fukushima))
- JOGF at Ōita, Ōita
  - No callsign at Yufu, Ōita (A repeater of JOGF)

== Marshall Islands ==
- V7AB at Majuro

== Netherlands ==
- Radio Gasselte at Gasselte
- MasterFM at Nuland
- Milano Team at Punthorst

== Philippines ==
- DWAD at Mandaluyong, Metro Manila

== Thailand ==
- "Sor. Wor. Thor." at Tambon Ban Phru (transmits AM stereo)
