= Majuro Educational Television =

Majuro Educational Television was a television station in the Majuro Atoll. It was owned by the Alele Corporation, a non-profit in charge of the Alele Museum.

== History ==
The station signed on in August 1989. The Alele Museum took over the part-time educational output from a private interest and broadcast its services with assistance from its small video production studio. Cameras from Brian Reimers were used.

METV by 1990 broadcast 10 hours a day in the clear, in opposition to MBC which broadcast encrypted. Programming was primarily donated from educational video tapes (educational programming produced in American Samoa and Greenpeace documentaries) and programming taped from KHET, the Hawaiian PBS station. Approximately 20-30% of the daily schedule (corresponding to 2-3 hours) was given to local programming produced by the station, covering local news and events, storytelling, public service announcements and Sunday church services in the Marshallese language.

Coverage was limited to Majuro Atoll and stretching as far as Arno Atoll. Due to the amateur nature of the operation, its coverage area was smaller than that of MBC, with 25% of the population of Majuro receiving the signal. If funding became available, facilities and coverage would be upgraded.

As of 1993, METV operated on an ad hoc basis, as the station lacked a license or formal approval from the Marshallese government or the FCC.

It is unknown when did the station go off air.
