= De Juffer, Gasselternijveen =

Dutch windmill

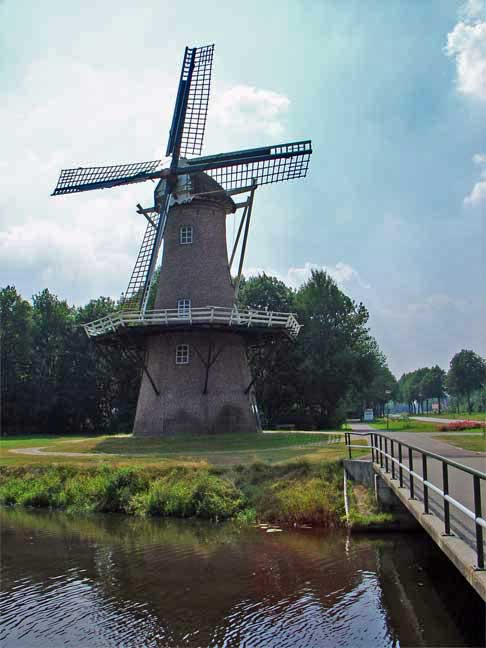
- De Juffer, July 2006

Origin
- Mill name: De Juffer
- Mill location: Hunzelaan 1a, 9514 BM Gasselternijveen
- Coordinates: 52°59′8.57″N 6°50′13.51″E
- Operator(s): Gemeente Aa en Hunze
- Year built: 1971

Information
- Purpose: Corn mill
- Type: Tower mill
- Storeys: Five storeys
- No. of sails: Four sails
- Type of sails: Common sails
- Windshaft: Cast iron
- Winding: Tailpole and winch
- No. of pairs of millstones: One pair
- Size of millstones: 1.10 metres (3 ft 7 in) diameter

De Juffer (English: The Damselfly) is a tower mill in Gasselternijveen, in Drenthe province of the Netherlands. It was built in 1971. The mill is listed as a Rijksmonument, number 46615

== History ==
In 1841, a tower mill was built on this site by millwright R Vlieghuis of Borger. The mill was later fitted with Patent sails, the leading edges of which were streamlined using the Van Bussel system. The mill was demolished in 1963. The brake wheel was used in the restoration of De Bonte Hen, Zaandam.

In 1968, it was decided to rebuild the mill. The tower was built by G J Warmink of Gasselternijveen, incorporating material from the mill demolished in 1963. Millwrighting work was by Medendorp of Zuidlaren. The brake wheel and wallower came from a demolished drainage mill De Breeken, which had stood in Westerwijtwerd, Groningen. New sails were fitted in 2009.

== Description ==
De Juffer is what the Dutch describe as a "ronde stenen stellingmolen". It is a five-storey brick tower mill with a stage. The stage is at third-floor level, it is 6.20 metres (20 ft 4 in) above ground level. The four Common sails, which have a span of 19.20 metres (63 ft 0 in), are carried in a cast-iron windshaft. This was made by Fabrikaat De Muinck Keizer, of Martenshoek, Groningen in 1899. The windshaft also carries the brake wheel which has 57 cogs. The brake wheel drives the wallower (32 cogs) at the top of the upright shaft. At the bottom of the upright shaft, the great spur wheel (72 cogs) drives the lantern pinion stone nut, which has 19 staves. This drives the 1.10 metres (3 ft 7 in) diameter French Burr millstones.

== Public access ==
De Juffer is open to the public on Wednesdays from 13:00 to 15:00, on Saturdays from 10:00 to 12:00 and at other times by appointment.
