= Gasselternijveen =

- Village
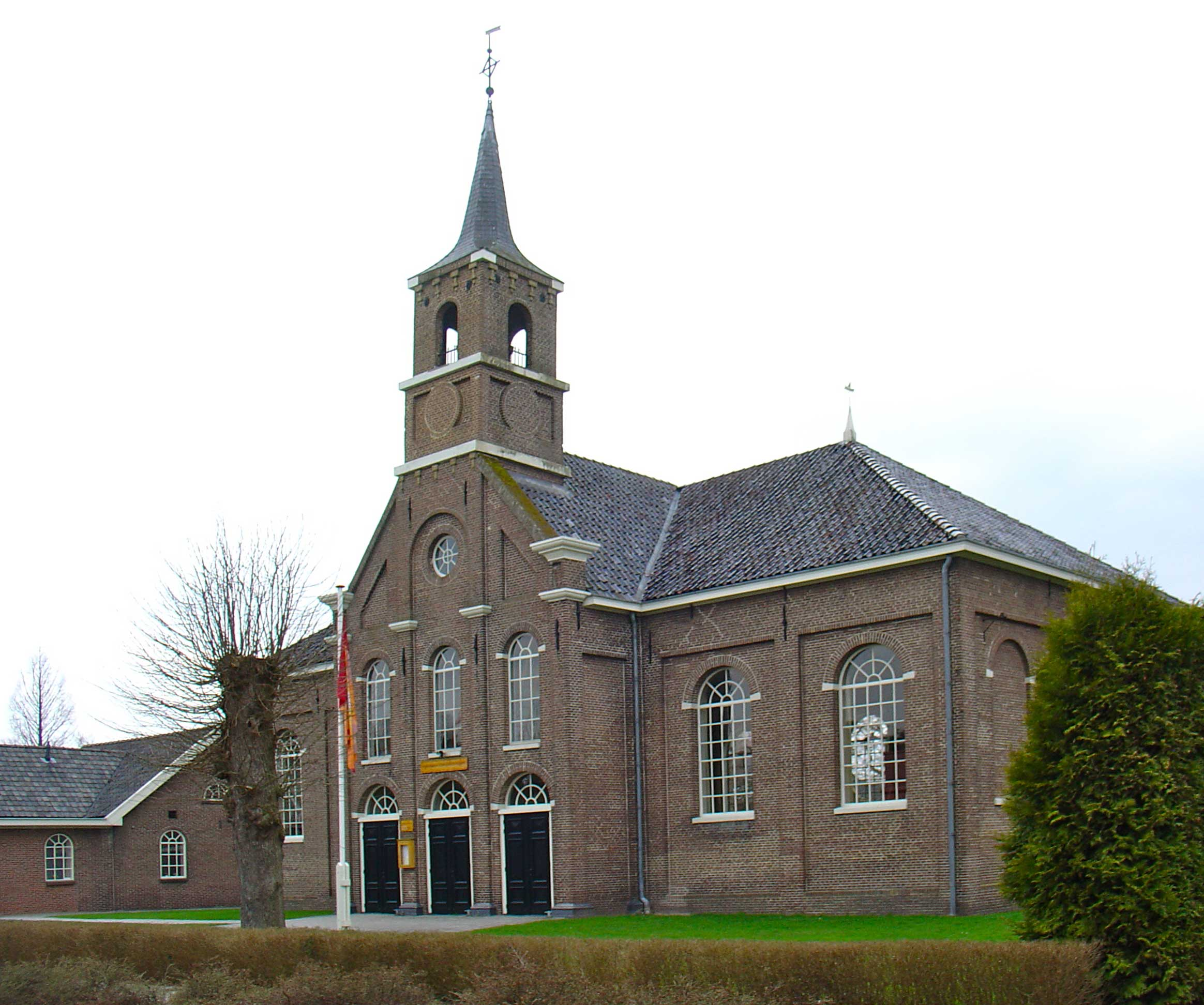
- Protestant Church

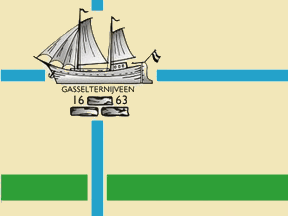
- Flag

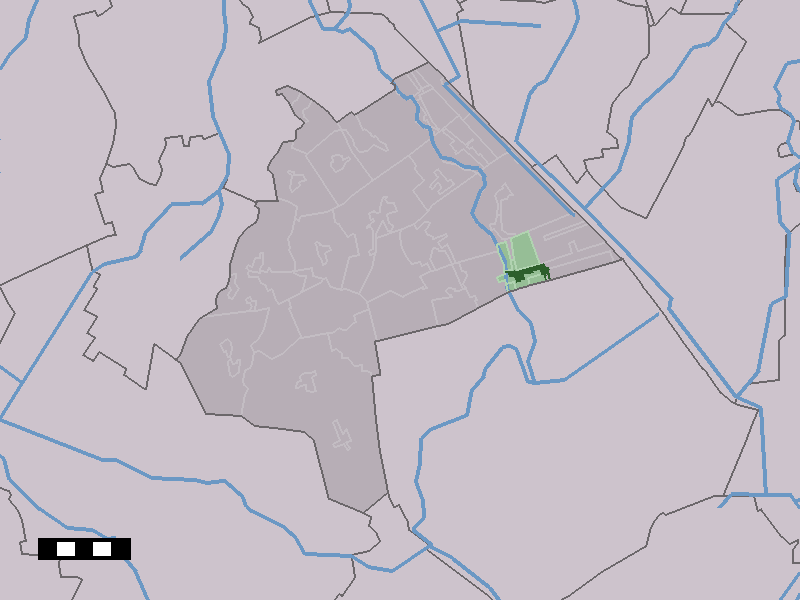
- The village centre (dark green) and the statistical district (light green) of Gasselternijveen in the municipality of Aa en Hunze.

- Location in the Netherlands Gasselternijveen (Netherlands)
- Coordinates: 52°59′12″N 6°50′50″E
- Country: Netherlands
- Province: Drenthe
- Municipality: Aa en Hunze

Area
  - Total: 5.61 km^{2} (2.17 sq mi)
- Elevation: 5 m (16 ft)

Population (2021)
  - Total: 1,785
  - Density: 318/km^{2} (824/sq mi)
- Time zone: UTC+1 (CET)
  - Summer (DST): UTC+2 (CEST)
- Postal code: 9514
- Dialing code: 0599

Gasselternijveen is a village in the Dutch province of Drenthe. It is a part of the municipality of Aa en Hunze, and lies about 20 km east of Assen.

== History ==
The village was first mentioned in 1739 as "Nieuw Gasselter Veen", and means "new peat colony of Gasselte.

A canal was built around 1663 by Johan Struyck to excavate the peat in the area. The colony wasn't very successfully until 1819 when the Gasselternijveenschemond was dug and connected the village to Stadskanaal. By 1844, the original canal had silted and could no longer be used.

Until the early 20th-century it was mainly a village of skippers and traders. Gasselternijveen was home to 488 people in 1840. The Dutch Reformed church was built between 1858 and 1859, and a tower was added in 1879.

Between 1905 and 1947, Gasselternijveen was connected to both the Zwolle to Stadskanaal railway and a branch line to Assen. The building was torn in 1966.

== Gallery ==
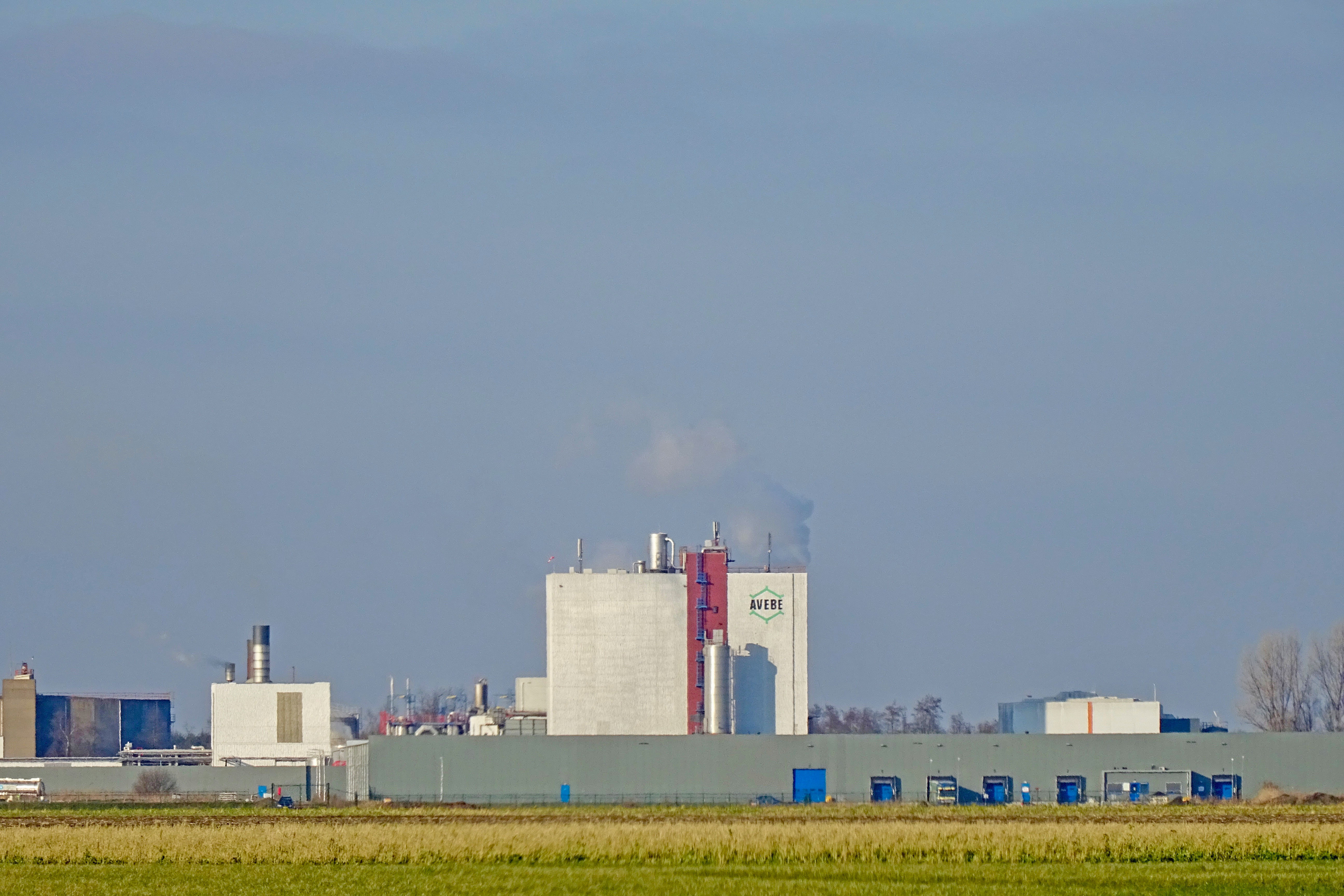
Avebe potato starch factory

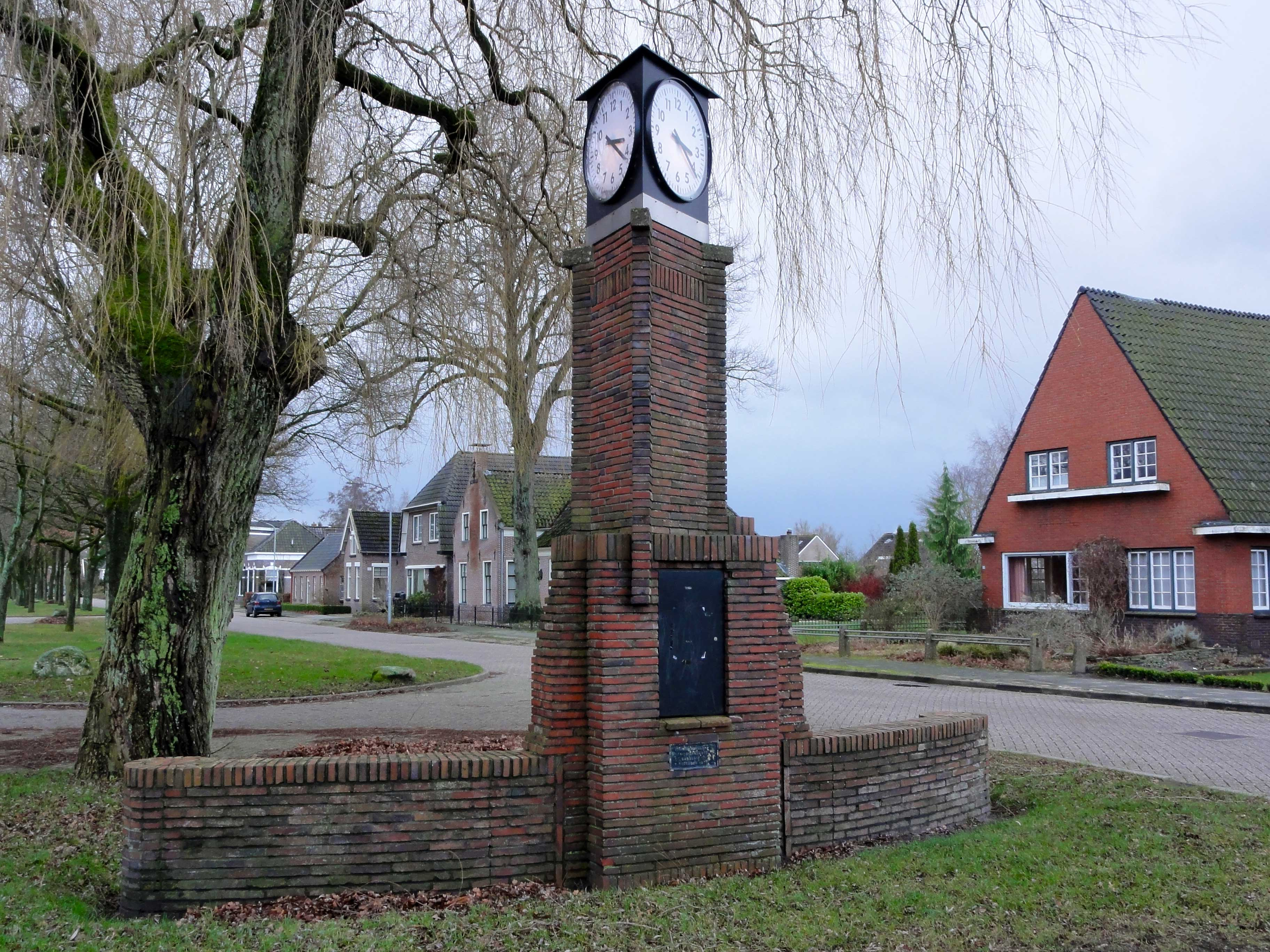
Village clock

Windmill "De Juffer"

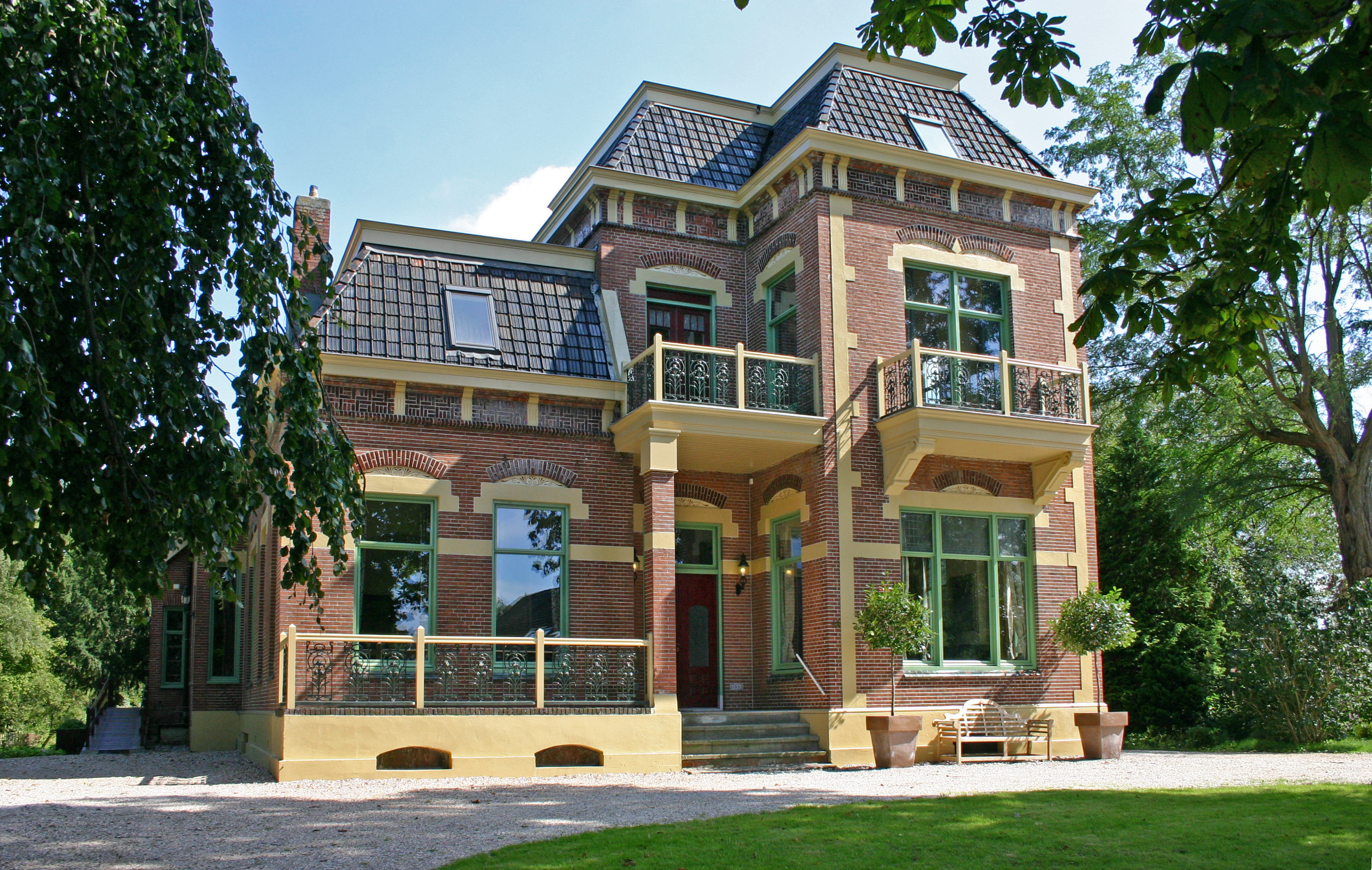
Villa Tergast
