= Gasselternijveenschemond =

- Village
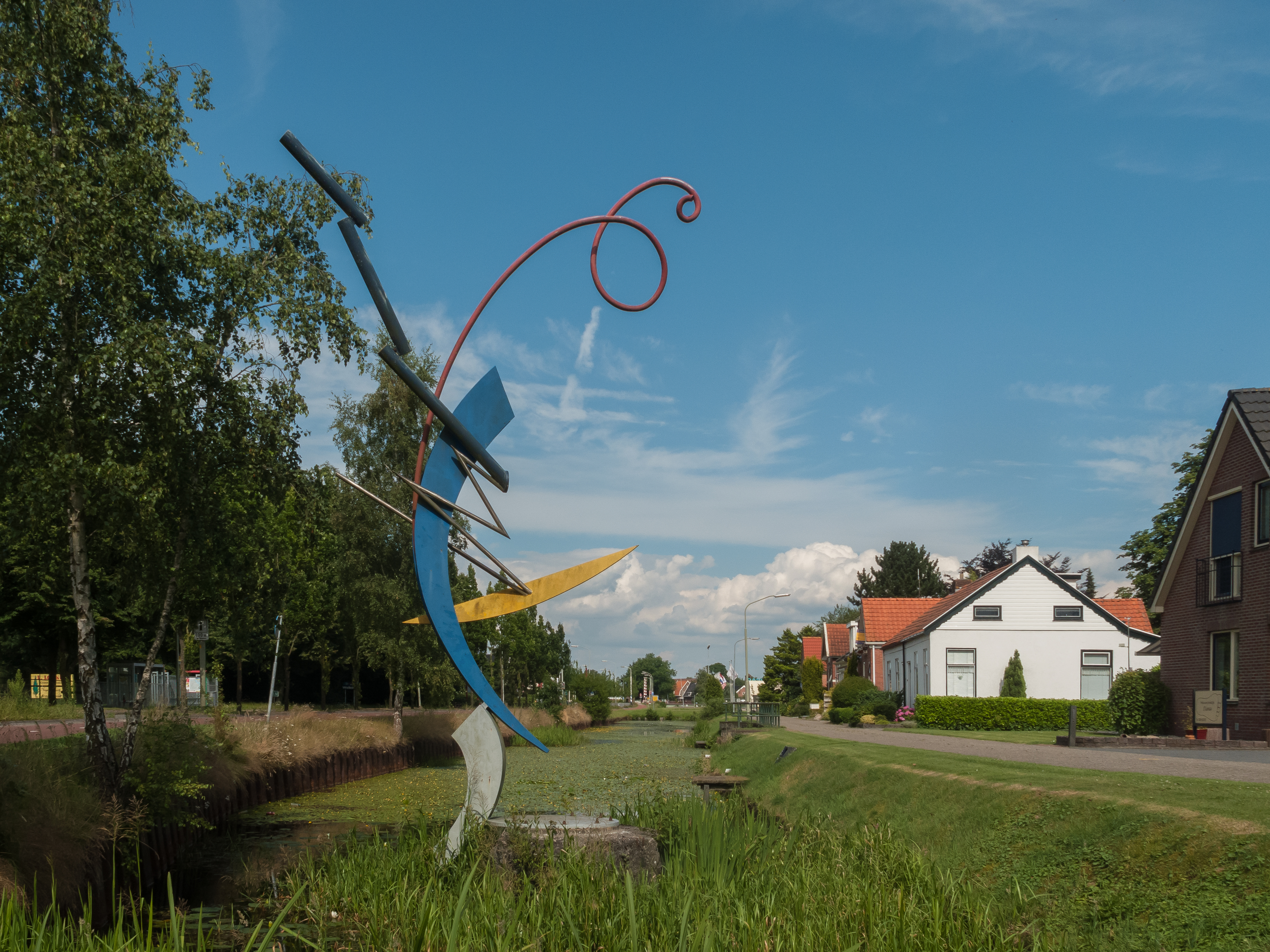
- Gasselternijveenschemond in 2014

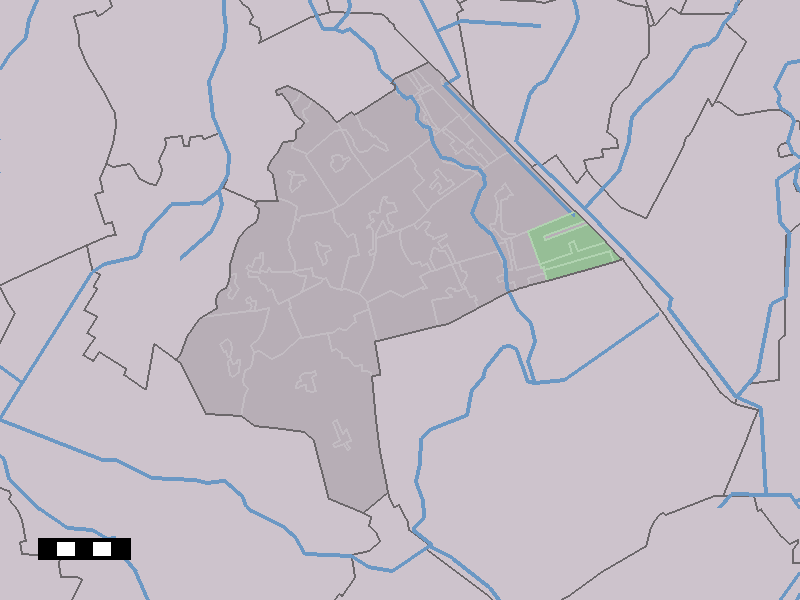
- Gasselternijveenschemond in the municipality of Aa en Hunze.

- Location in the Netherlands Gasselternijveenschemond (Netherlands)
- Coordinates: 52°59′44″N 6°53′50″E
- Country: Netherlands
- Province: Drenthe
- Municipality: Aa en Hunze

Area
  - Total: 1.11 km^{2} (0.43 sq mi)
- Elevation: 5 m (16 ft)

Population (2021)
  - Total: 635
  - Density: 572/km^{2} (1,480/sq mi)
- Time zone: UTC+1 (CET)
  - Summer (DST): UTC+2 (CEST)
- Postal code: 9515
- Dialing code: 0599

Gasselternijveenschemond is a village in the Dutch province of Drenthe. It is a part of the municipality of Aa en Hunze, and lies about 23 km east of Assen.

The village was first mentioned in 1843 as Gasselter-Nijeveenstermond, and means "(canal) mouth of the new peat (colony) of Gasselte. It refers to a canal which was dug around 1819.

There used to be a hamlet nearby called Eerste Dwarsdiep (First Transversal Canal) which used the place name sign "Gasselternijveenschemond Eerste Dwarsdiep" which at 39 letters was the longest of the Netherlands. Since at least 1998, it has reverted to the simple "Gasselternijveenschemond".

In 1865, a cardboard factory and a dairy opened in the village. In 1970s, the canal was filled up.
