= .mh =

Internet country code top-level domain for the Marshall Islands

- Introduced: August 16, 1996
- TLD type: Country code top-level domain
- Registry: National Telecommunications Authority
- Sponsor: Ministry of Transportation and Communications
- Intended use: Entities connected with Marshall Islands
- Registry website: www.nic.net.mh

.mh is the Internet country code top-level domain (ccTLD) for the Marshall Islands. Its registry website has been inactive since the end of 2021, and prior to that had not been updated since 1997. The mechanism of registering domains listed on that site involved downloading an InterNIC template form that had been a dead link for at least several years.

As of 2021, a search showed three active websites using a .mh domain: one for the government's Natural Disaster Management Office, one for the school system, and one for a telecommunications company. The Natural Disaster Management Office website went offline a year later. In 2022, the Office of Commerce, Investment & Tourism created a site under the domain, but moved to .org in late 2023. The same year, Wahoo, a store based in Majuro, opened a website under the domain.

Most of the people who govern a site from the Marshall Islands usually register it under .com, .net or .org. Almost all sites registered to entities in the Marshall Islands are hosted in other countries.

== See also ==
- Communications in the Marshall Islands
- Internet in the Marshall Islands
- Internet in the United States
- .us
