= Oceania Television Network =

Palauan television channel

Oceania Television Network (OTV) is Palau's only Pacific Island-content television station. It was founded by Jeff Barabe and Kassi Berg of Roll 'em Productions and launched in December 2006. OTV broadcasts two feeds: a regional channel with content from the wider region, on Palau National Communications Corporation digital cable channel 23 and an Er Kid (Ours) feed on cable in Palau (channel 29) with local programming.

It is a member of the Asia-Pacific Institute for Broadcasting Development.

In August 2007, executive producer Kassi Berg travelled to Fiji and New Zealand as part of the North-meets-South mission to meet with Pacific Island producers, in order to build partnerships and obtain content for OTV.

Content for this station includes several original programs, including The Jock Block hosted by Mike Fox and Myers Techitong, and Chised hosted by Joe Aitaro and Pia Morei. Other shows include Uum era a Belau, the local cooking show; Olekaiang, a comedy for youth; local news and weather. The channel also broadcasts the Pacific Community newsmagazine The Pacific Way.
