= De Bonte Hen, Zaandam =

Grinding mill in Westzaan, Netherlands

De Bonte Hen
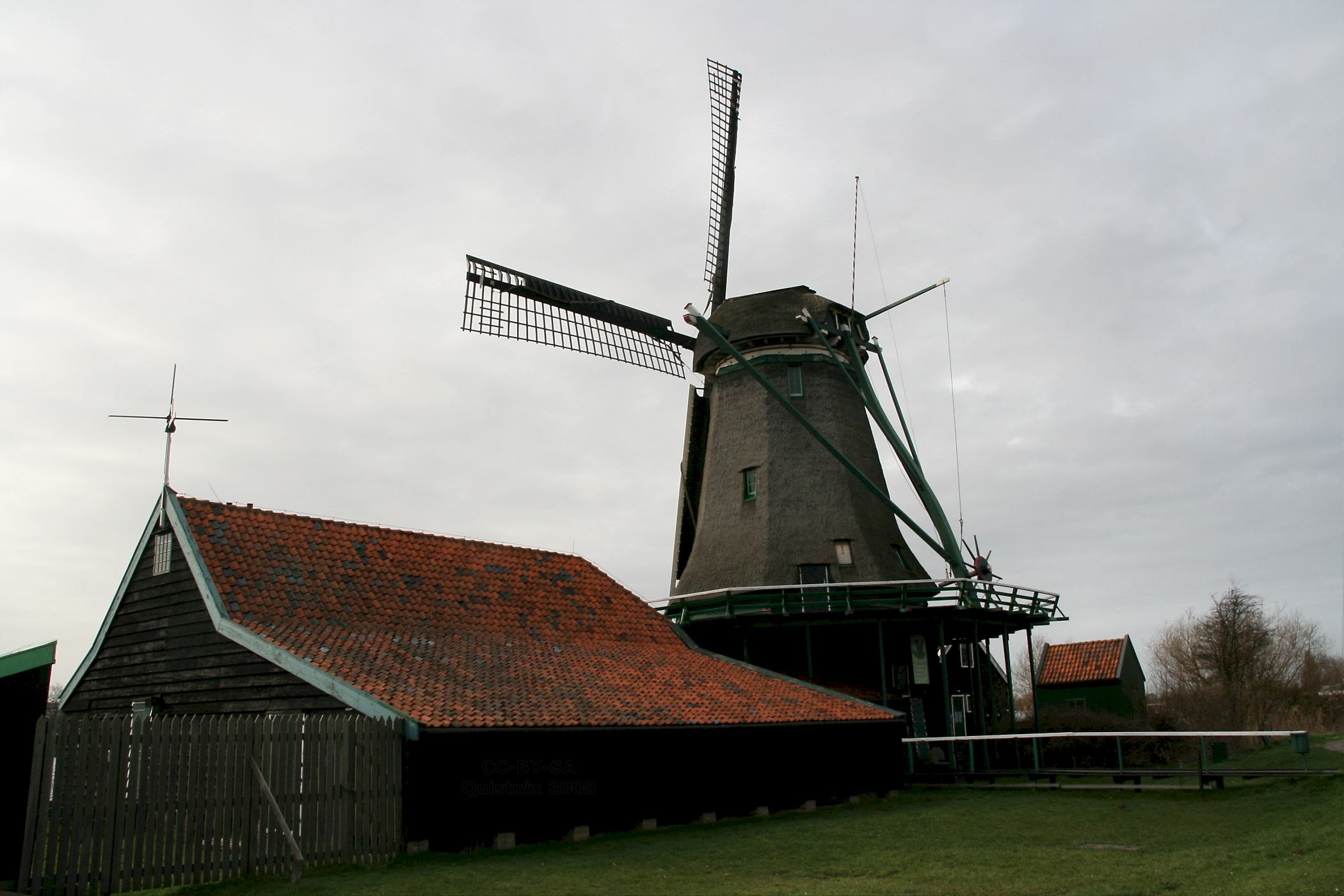
- De Bonte Hen, 1693
- Interactive map of De Bonte Hen

Origin
- Mill name: De Bonte Hen
- Mill location: Ongd bij Kalverringdijk
- Coordinates: 52.4780°N 4.8133°E
- Operator: Vereniging De Zaansche Molen
- Year built: 1693

Information
- Type: Oil mill
- Storeys: Three-storey Grinding
- Base storeys: Two-storey base
- No. of sails: Four sails
- Type of sails: Common sails
- Winding: Tailpole and winch
- Other information: Only remaining wind powered paper mill in the world

De Bonte Hen (The Spotted Hen) is the name of an oil mill, located in the Zaanse Schans, Netherlands. De Bonte Hen is the northernmost of the mills in Zaanse Schans.

The original mill was built in 1693. It was rebuilt In 1935 and restored in 1975. Since then, the mill has been operated weekly on a voluntary basis. It contains original oil cellars for the storage of oil made at the mill.

== See also ==
- De Gekroonde Poelenburg, Zaandam
- De Huisman, Zaandam
- De Kat, Zaandam
- De Os, Zaandam
- De Zoeker, Zaandam

== Gallery ==
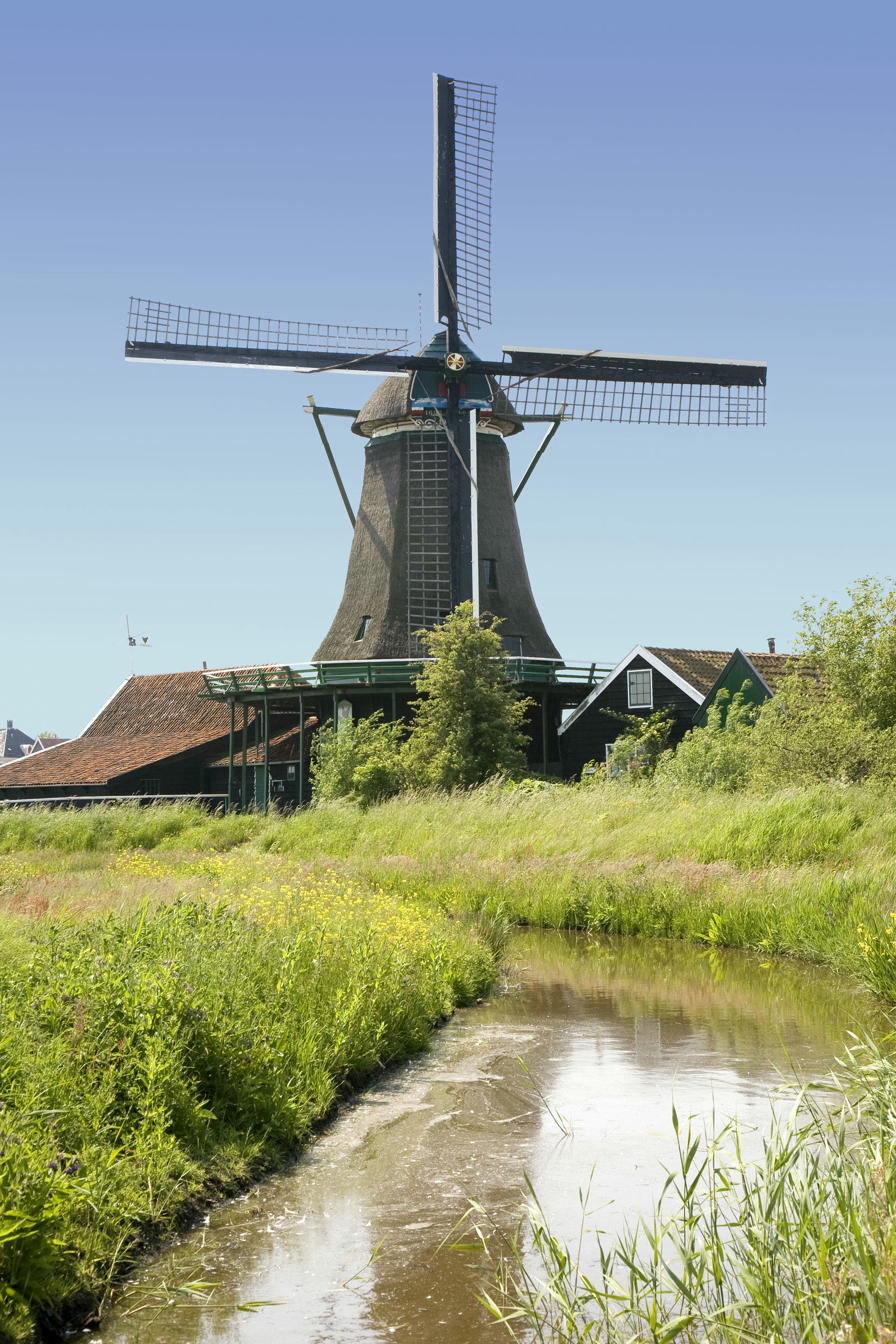

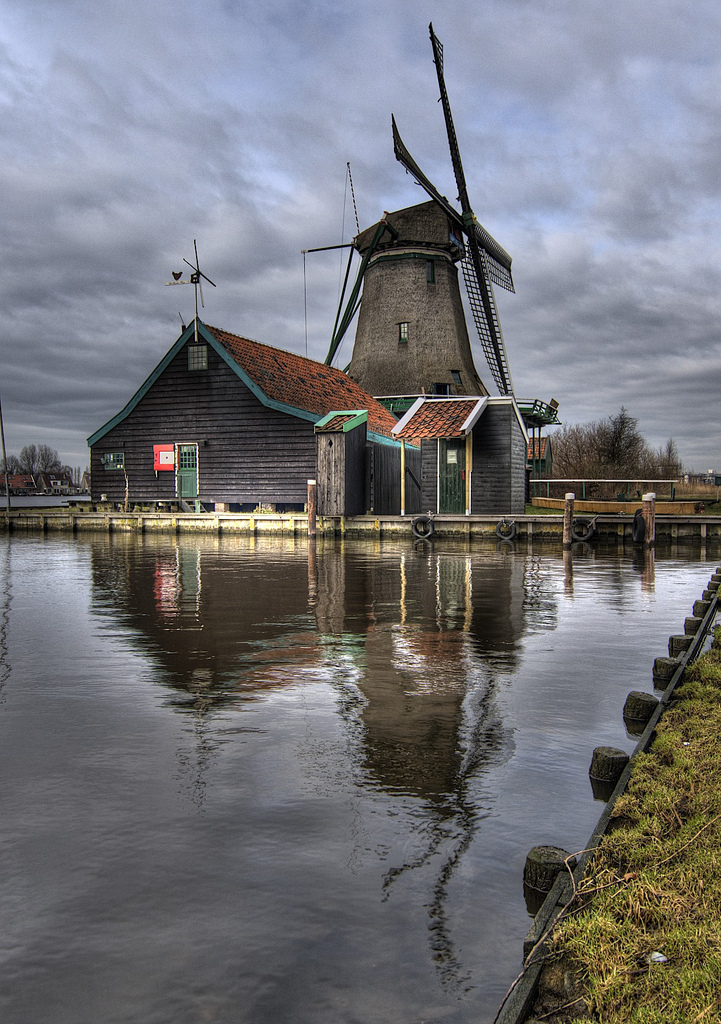

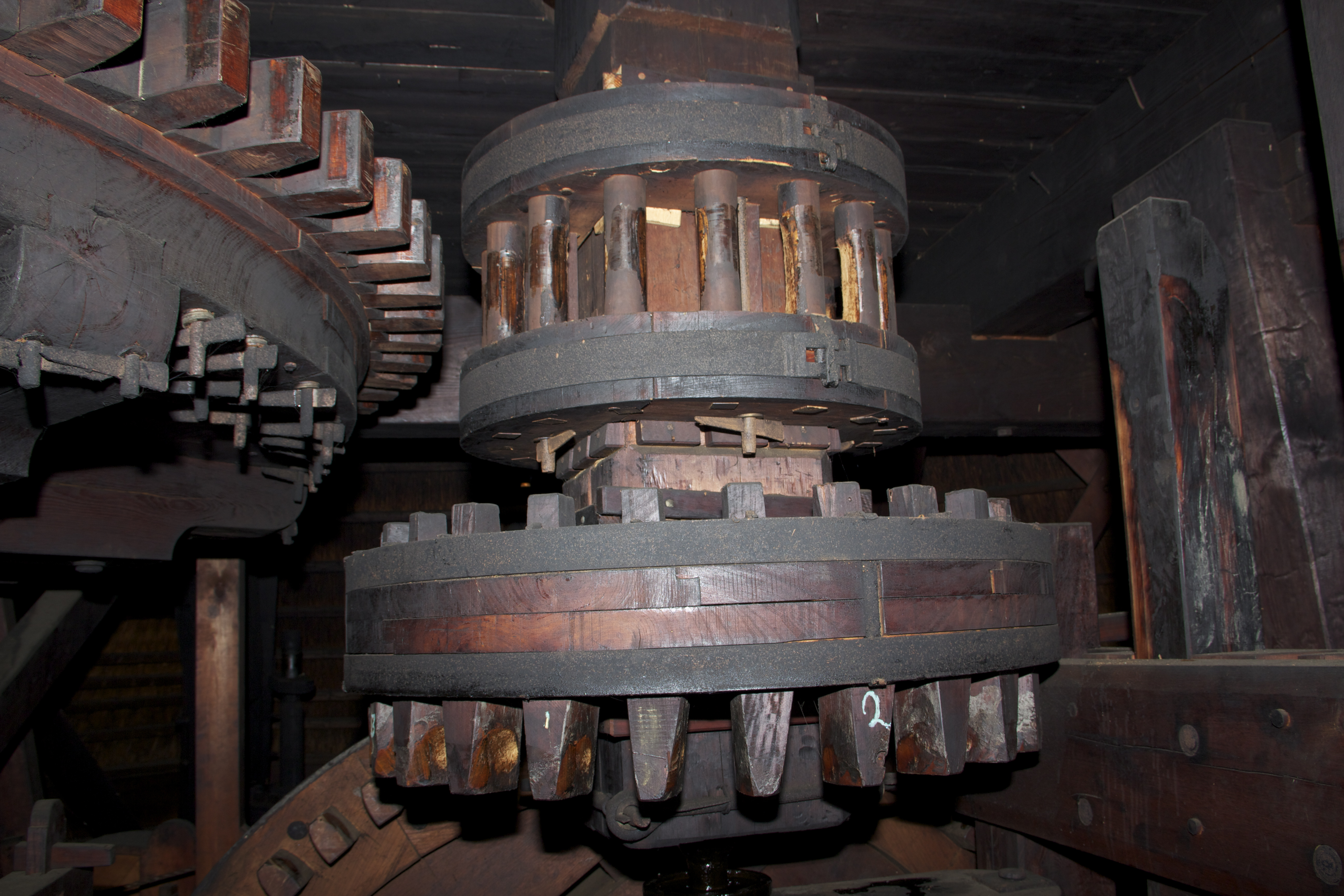

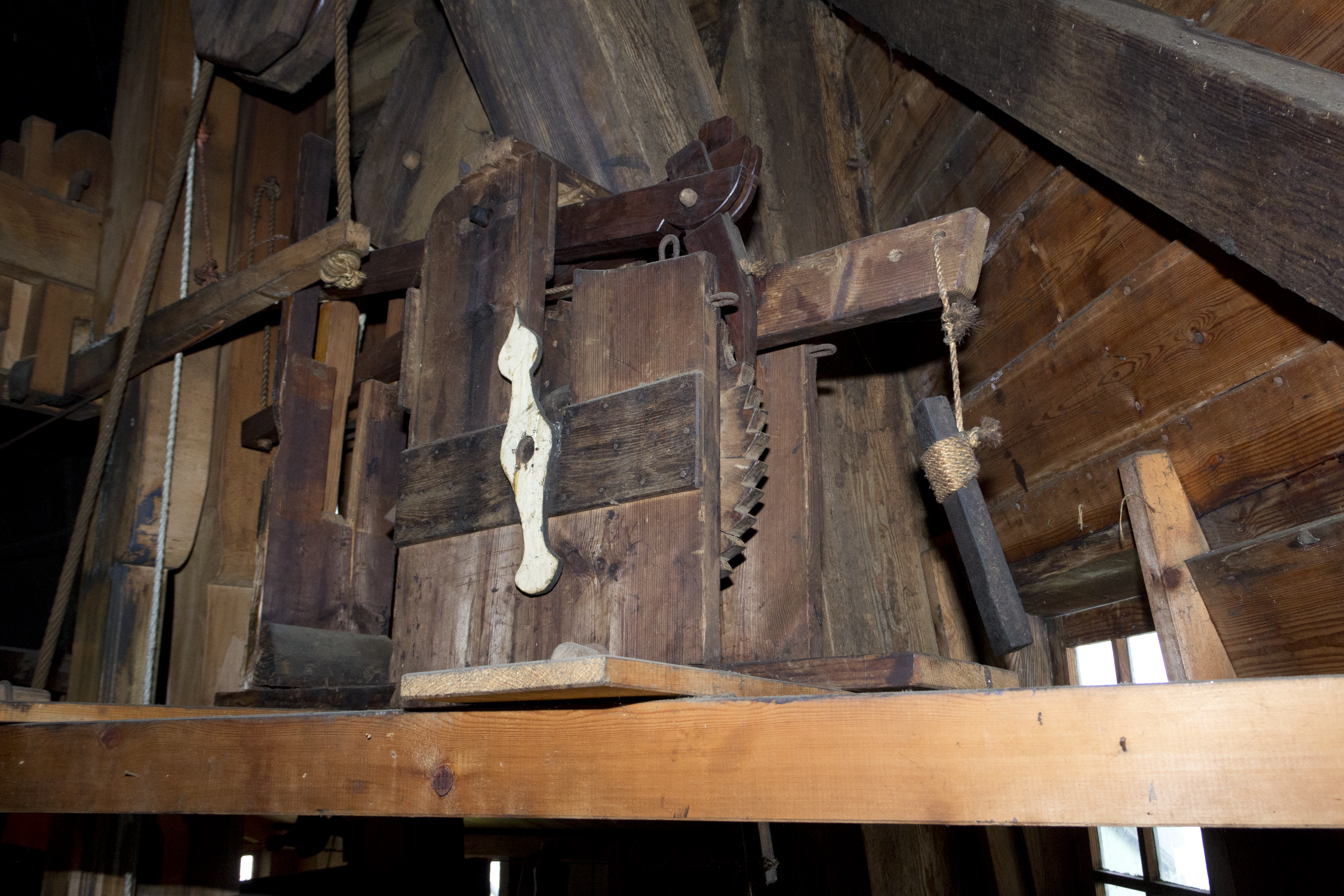

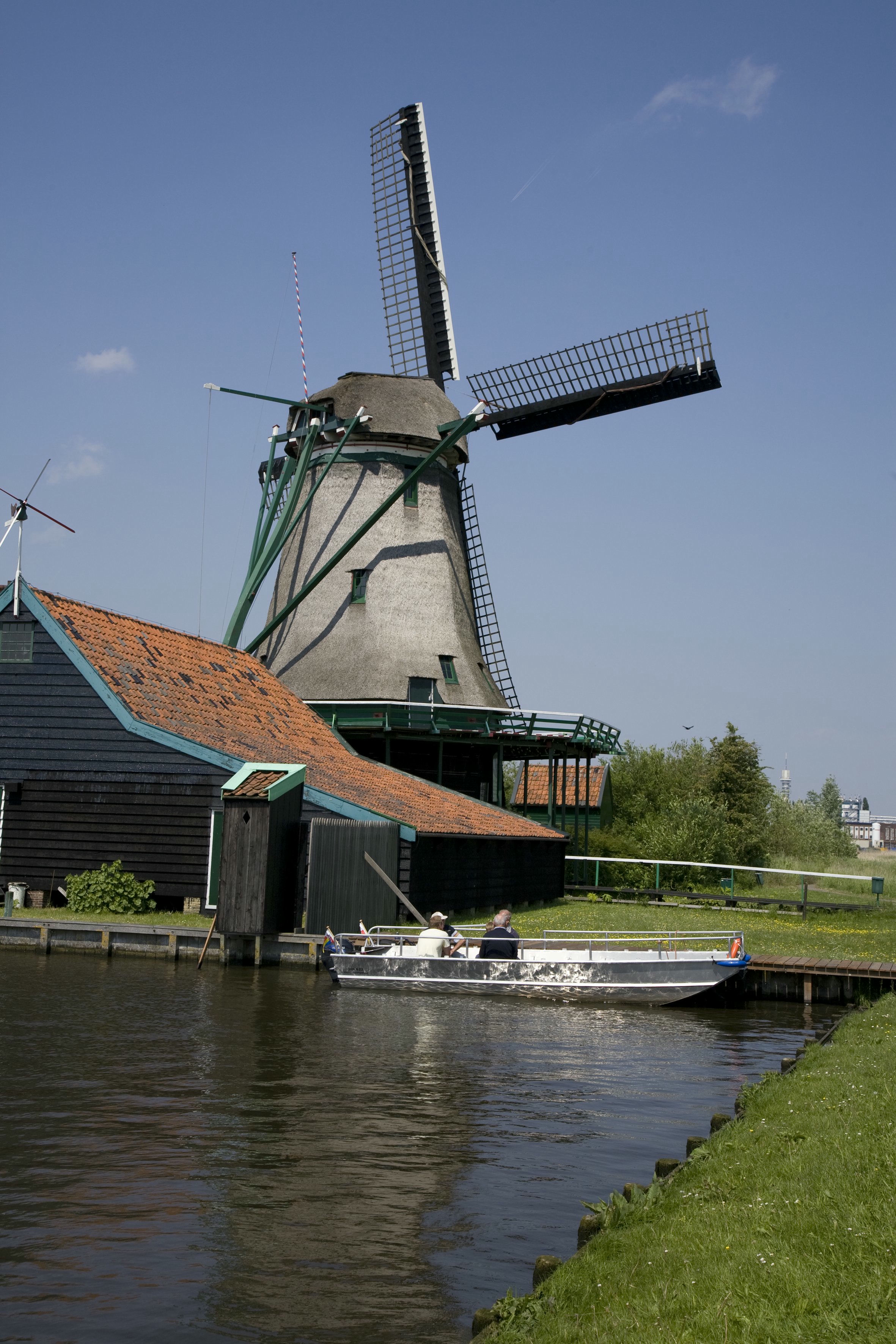
