= Gasselte =

- Village
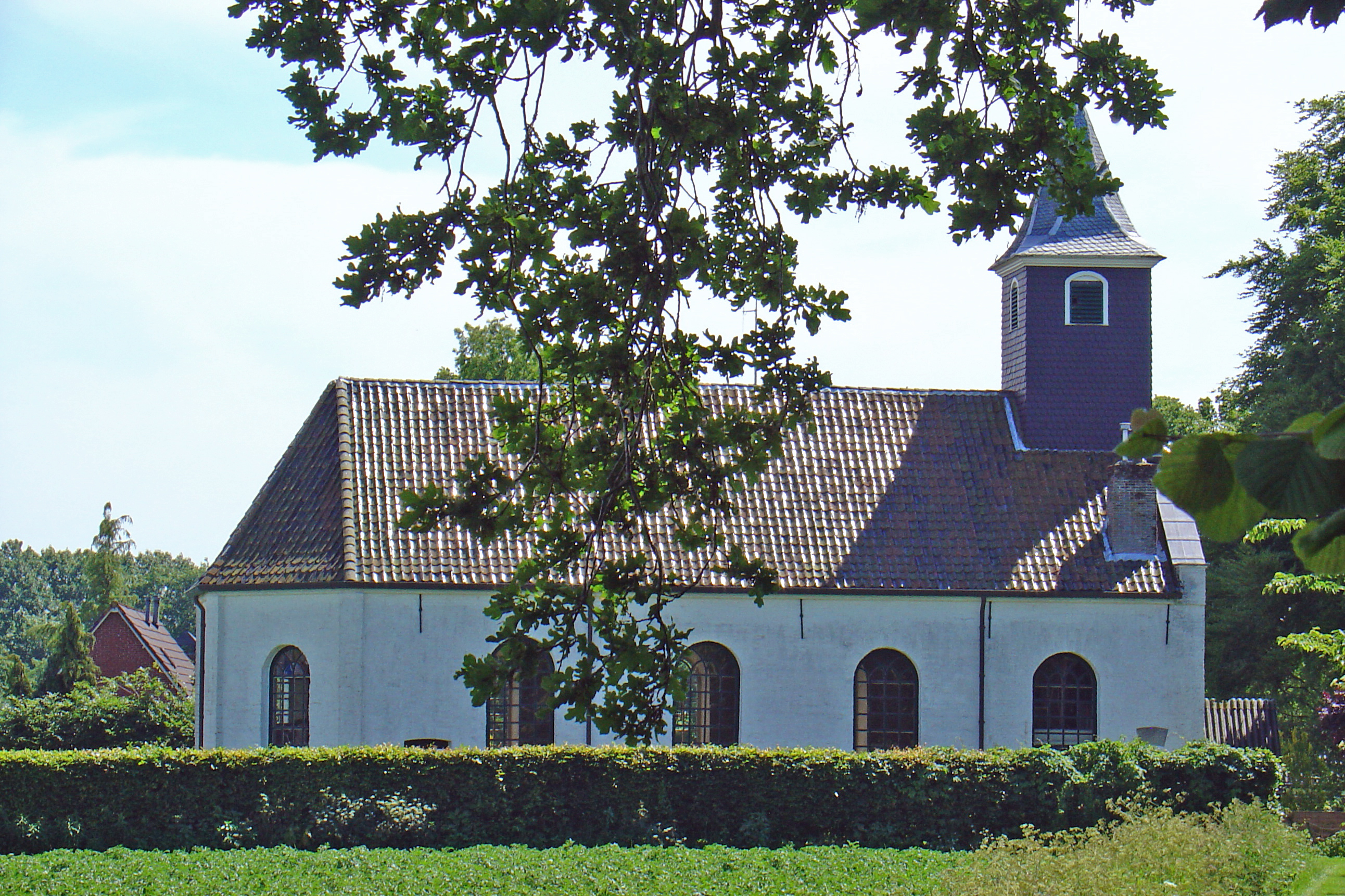
- Church of Gasselte

- Flag Coat of arms

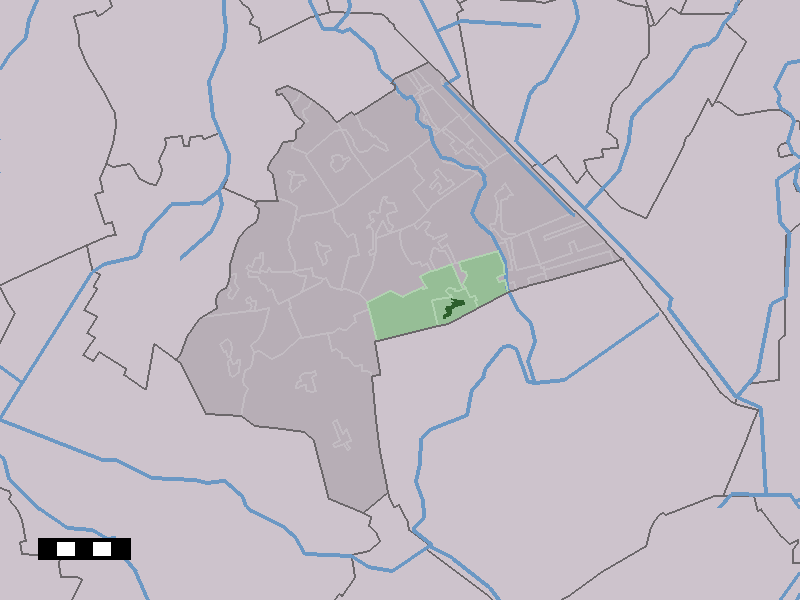
- The village centre (dark green) and the statistical district (light green) of Gasselte in the municipality of Aa en Hunze.

- Location in the Netherlands Gasselte (Netherlands)
- Coordinates: 52°58′19″N 6°47′32″E
- Country: Netherlands
- Province: Drenthe
- Municipality: Aa en Hunze

Area
  - Total: 19.55 km^{2} (7.55 sq mi)
- Elevation: 13 m (43 ft)

Population (2021)
  - Total: 1,770
  - Density: 90.5/km^{2} (234/sq mi)
- Time zone: UTC+1 (CET)
  - Summer (DST): UTC+2 (CEST)
- Postal code: 9462
- Dialing code: 0599

Gasselte is a village in the Dutch province of Drenthe. Located in the municipality of Aa en Hunze, it is situated about 16 km (9.9 mi) east of Assen. In 2021, it had a population of 1,770.

== History ==
The village was first mentioned in 1302 as "Jacobus de Gesholte". The etymology is unclear. Gasselte is an esdorp on the highest part of the Hondsrug which developed during the Early Middle Ages as a satellite of Borger. It used to consist of two settlement with their own es (communal pasture): Lutkenend (Little End) and Grotenend (Big End).

The Dutch Reformed church dates from the 13th century and has been painted white. It was restored in 1637 and again in 1647. The detached tower was demolished in 1787 and replaced by a little tower on the roof.

In 1830, a large part of the village was destroyed in a fire. Gasselte was home to 390 people in 1840. During the 19th century, the two original hamlets grew into one village. There used to be railway station on the Gasselternijveen to Assen railway line between 1905 and 1947. The building was demolished in 1969.

Between 1946 and 2013, sand was excavated at Gasselterveld resulting in a lake with a depth of up to 50 metres (160 ft). In 2017, a beach was constructed near the lake. Gasselte was a separate municipality until 1998, when it became a part of the newly established municipality of Aa en Hunze.

In 2021, Gasselte was used as the postcard for the United Kingdom during the Eurovision Song Contest 2021.

== Gallery ==
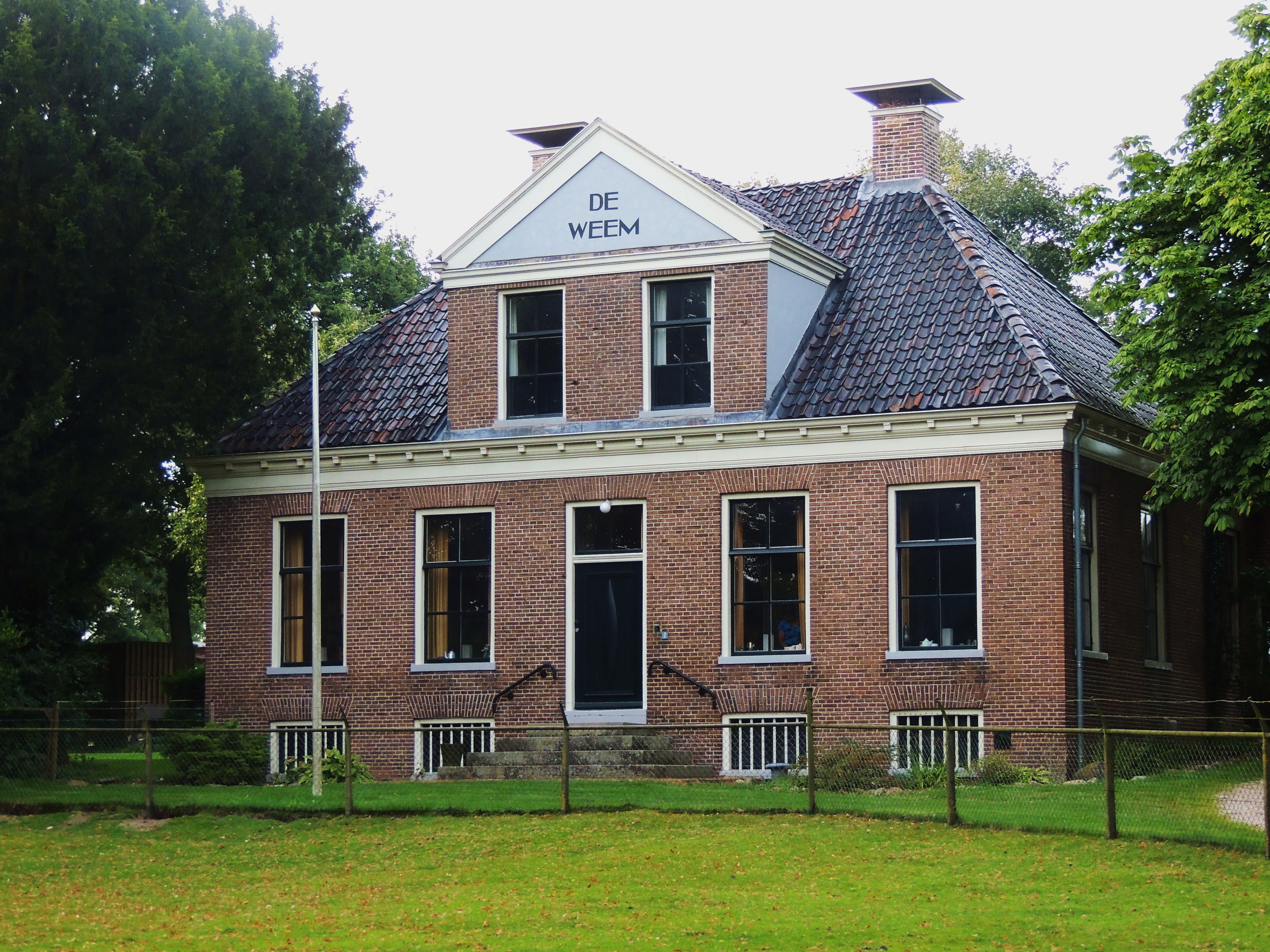
Clergy house De Ween

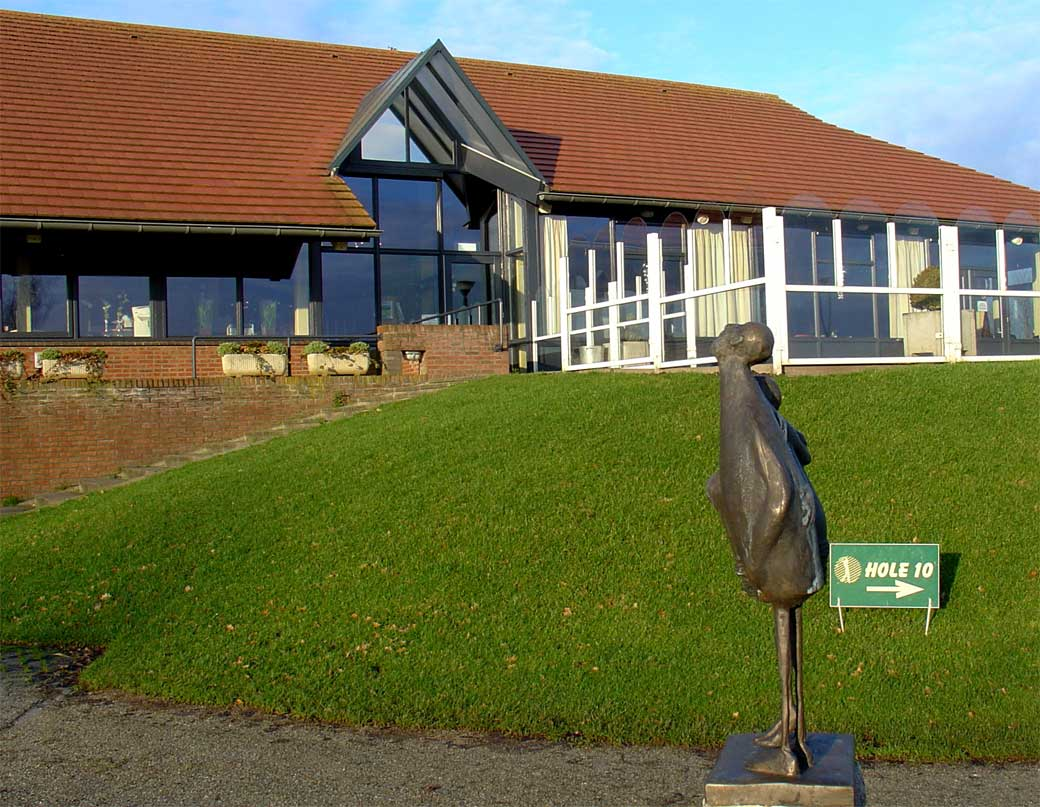
Golf course De Seemslanden

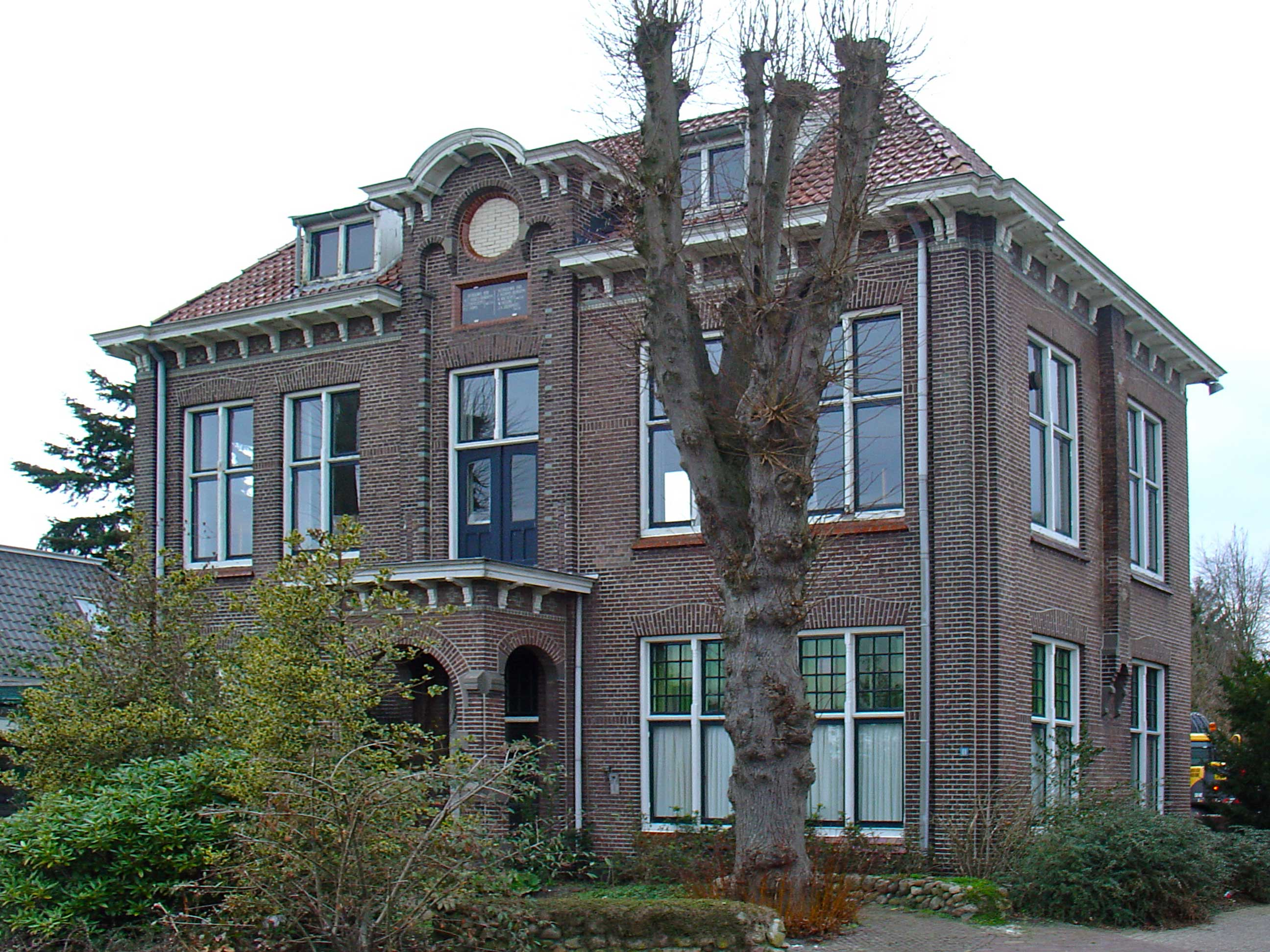
Former town hall

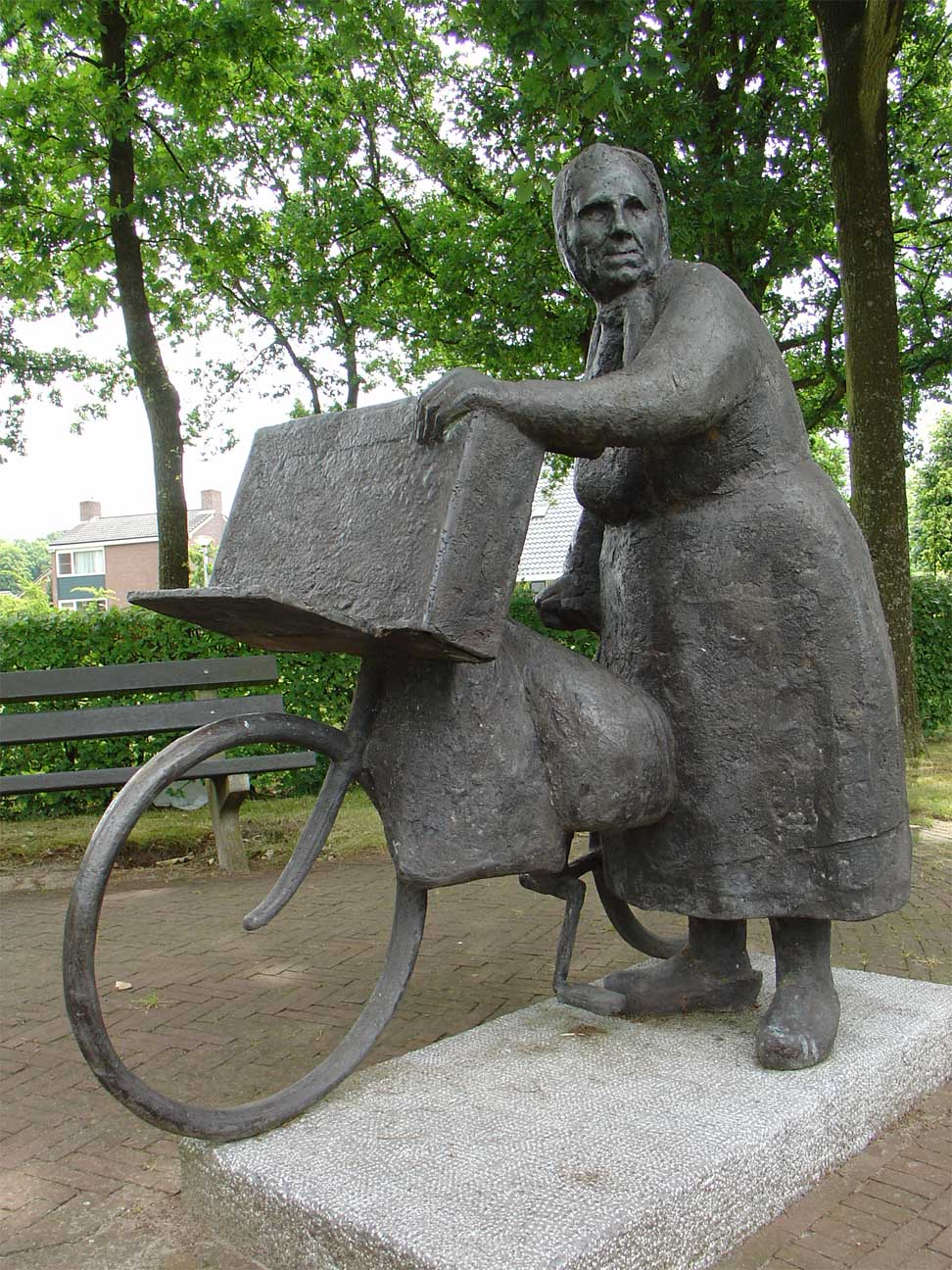
Statue of Wemeltje Kruit
