= Alele Museum & Public Library =

National museum and archive of the Marshall Islands

Coordinates: 7.107574°N 171.373472°E

- Alele Museum & Public Library

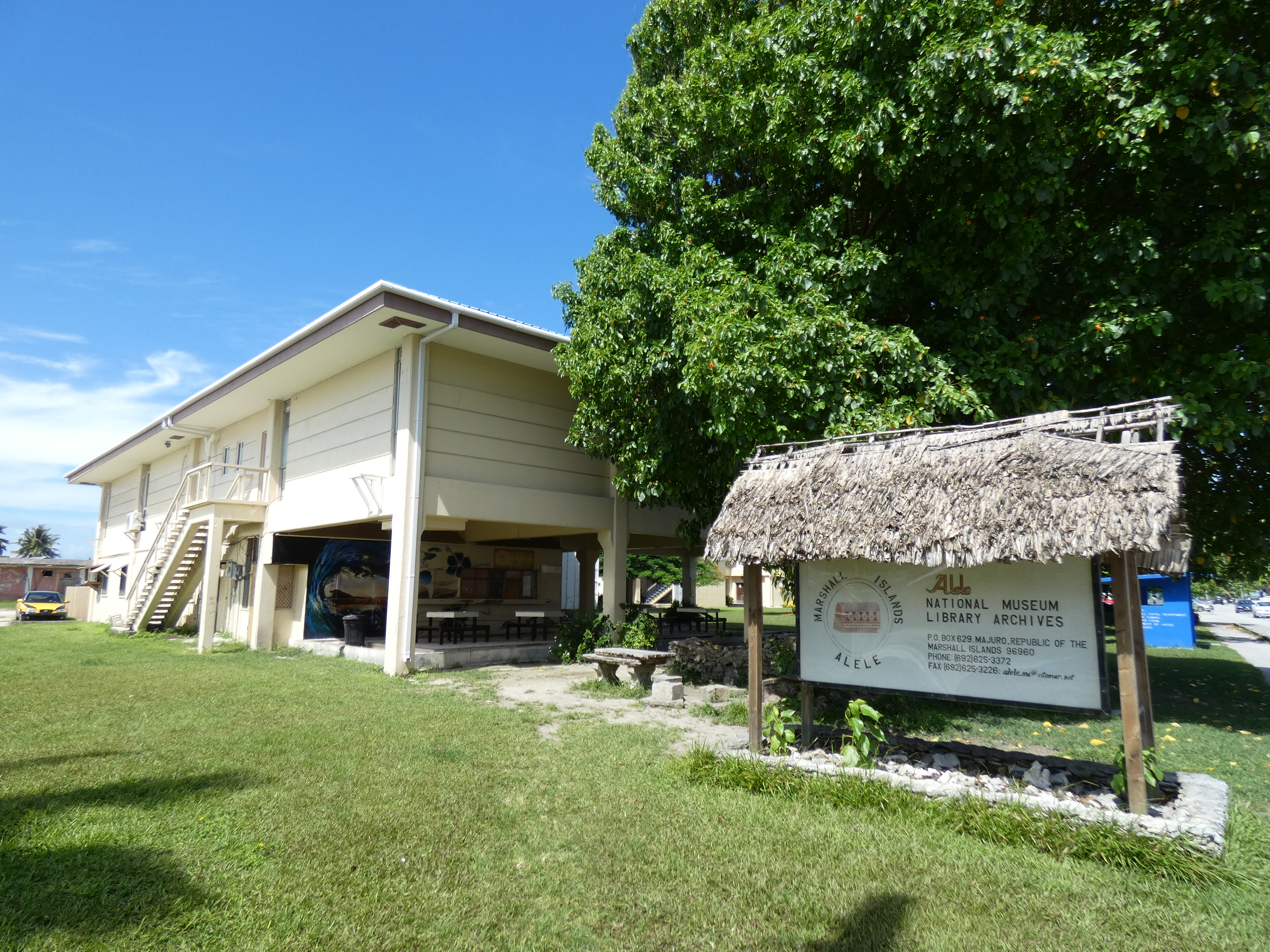
- Formation: 1981
- Staff: 10 (2020)
- Website: https://www.alele.org/

Alele Museum & Public Library is the national museum and the national archive of the Marshall Islands. It also hosts the only public library in the country.

== Background ==
The idea of a museum for the Marshall Islands was first developed in 1968 with the Marshall Islands Museum Committee meeting initially of 8 February that year. On 25 March 1970, a charter was incorporated for a Marshall Islands Museum. It was decided that the museum and library would share a purpose-built premises and the building was completed in 1974.

As of 2020, the organisation had ten staff. The alele means bag or basket in Marshallese, and represents a particular receptacle in which a family's valuables would have traditionally been kept.

== Museum ==
The museum opened in 1981 and has been in continuous operation since then, apart from between 2011 and 2013. The museum is on the ground floor of the building and has exhibits across three rooms. Displays focus on Marshallese culture, including traditional navigation, warfare, tools, crafts and jewellery. Due to a lack of space, the museum is unable to display the large items from its textile collection, in particular its nieded which are traditional women's cloths.

The museum also organisations the Manit Day celebrations, which encourages the celebration of Marshallese culture.

A major aspect of the museum's public engagement work is its regular radio program which has been running since the 1980s and connects people in the outer islands in particular to the work of the museum.

=== Collections and research ===
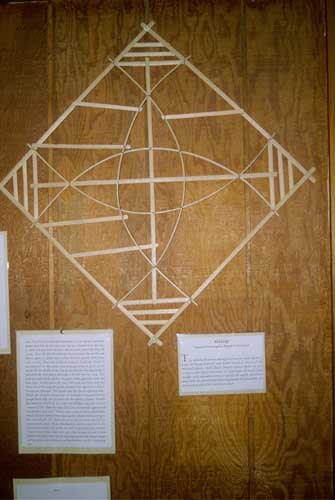
Marshallese navigational chart, on display in Alele Museum in 2008

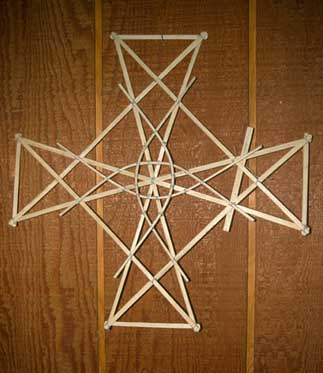
Marshallese navigational chart on display at Alele Museum

The museum's collection includes traditional tools, objects relating to housing, jewellery, drums, fishing apparatus, tattooing, weaving, canoes (and model canoes), and navigation, including stick charts, a Marshallese nautical tool used to memorise wave patterns. The museum has been active in collecting and recording traditional Marshallese crafts.

The museum has collaborated to understand and create listings for Marshallese intangible heritage, in particular work on indigenous navigation. The museum is part of an international collaboration building a digital archive of nuclear history relating to the country. In 2004 the museum led a new research project investigating Marshallese traditional medicine.

=== Overseas collections ===
In part, due to legacies of colonialism, many overseas institutions hold collections of Marshallese material culture, including: Penn Museum; Burke Museum; Te Papa; the Metropolitan Museum of Art; British Museum, amongst others.

==== Gallery of objects held in overseas collections ====
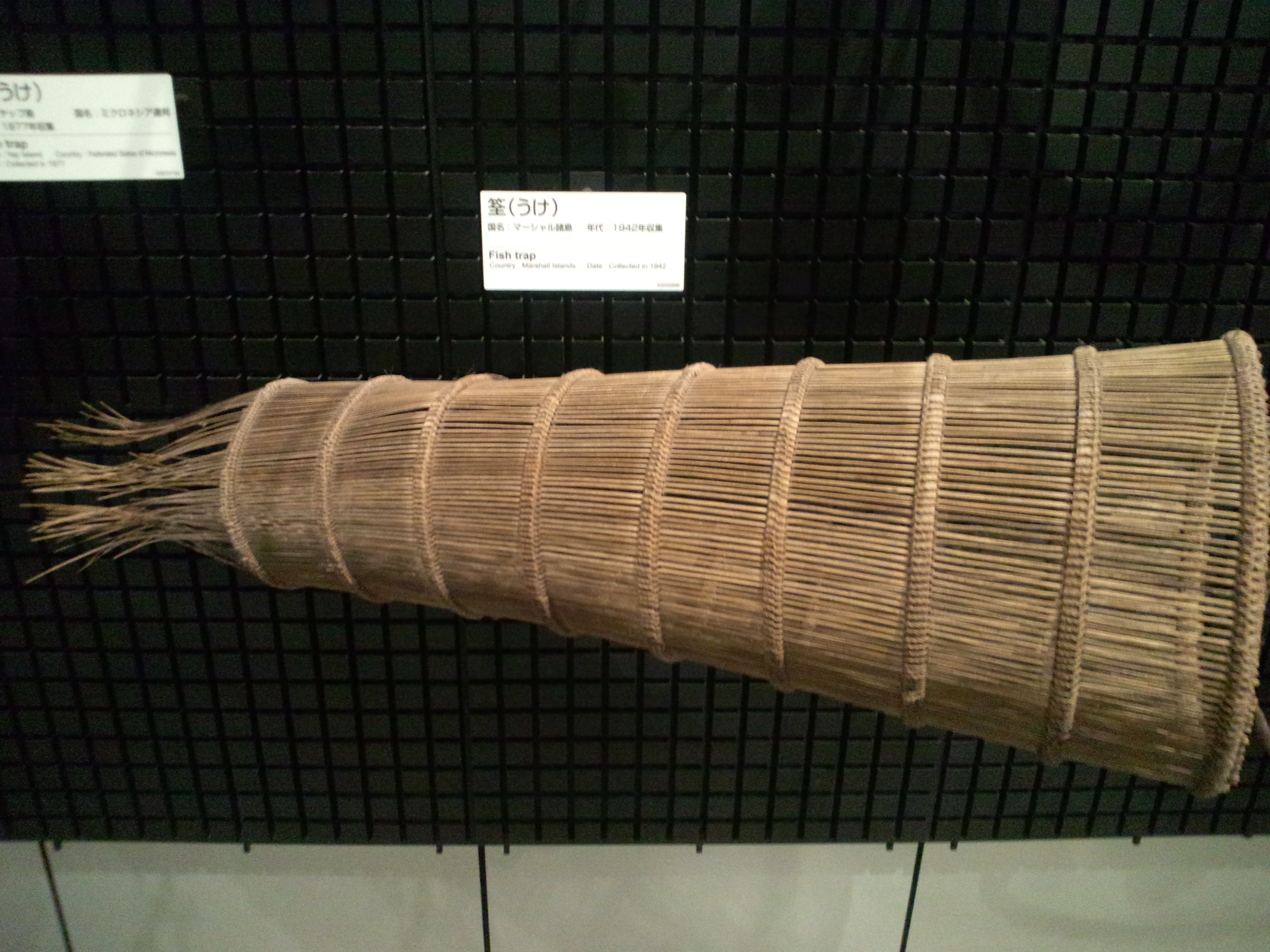
Fish trap, collected 1942 (National Museum of Ethnology, Osaka)

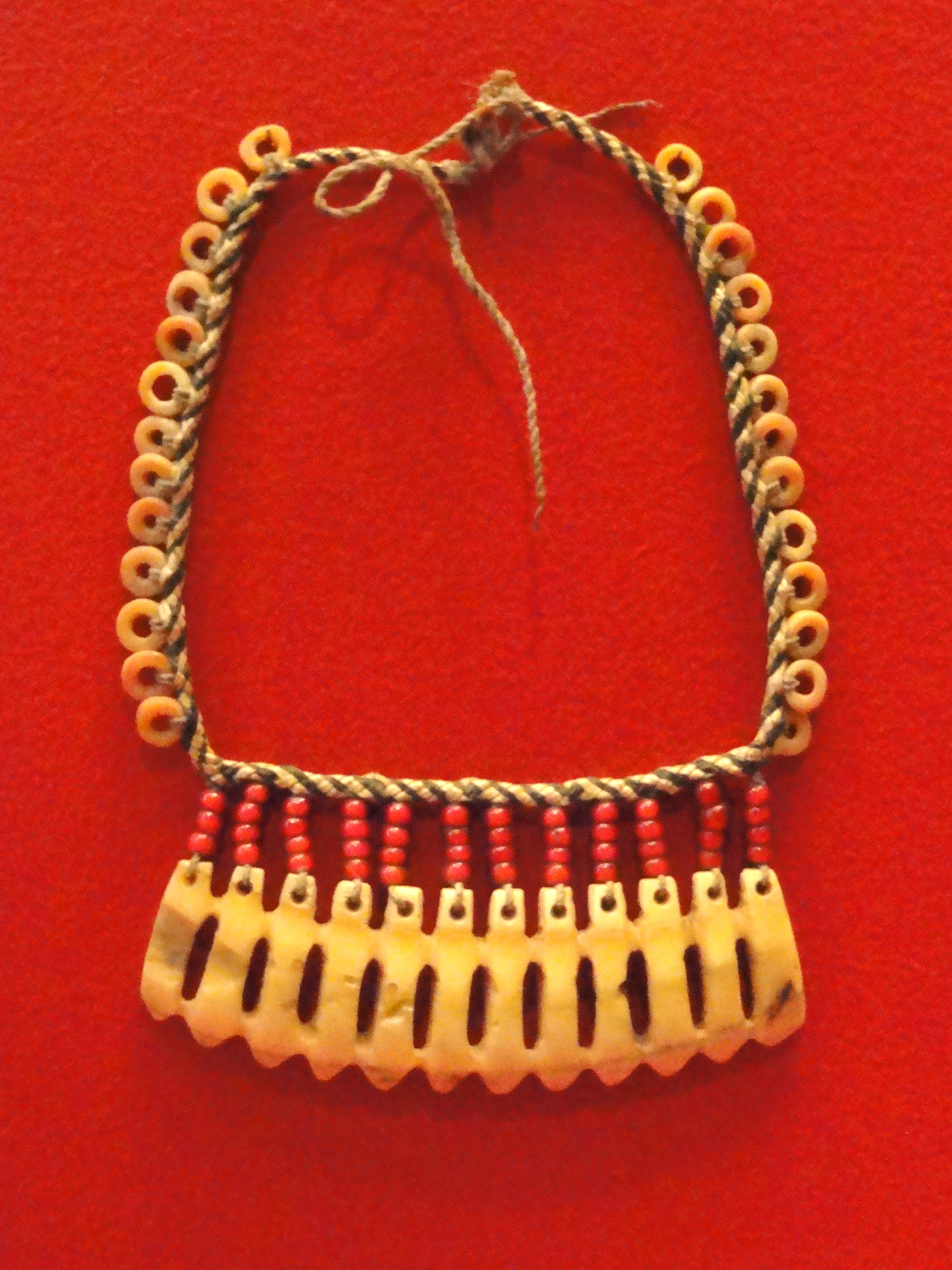
Necklace: sperm whale teeth, glass beads, spondylus disks, plant fiber, Marshall Islands, 1891 (Staatlichen Museums für Völkerkunde München)

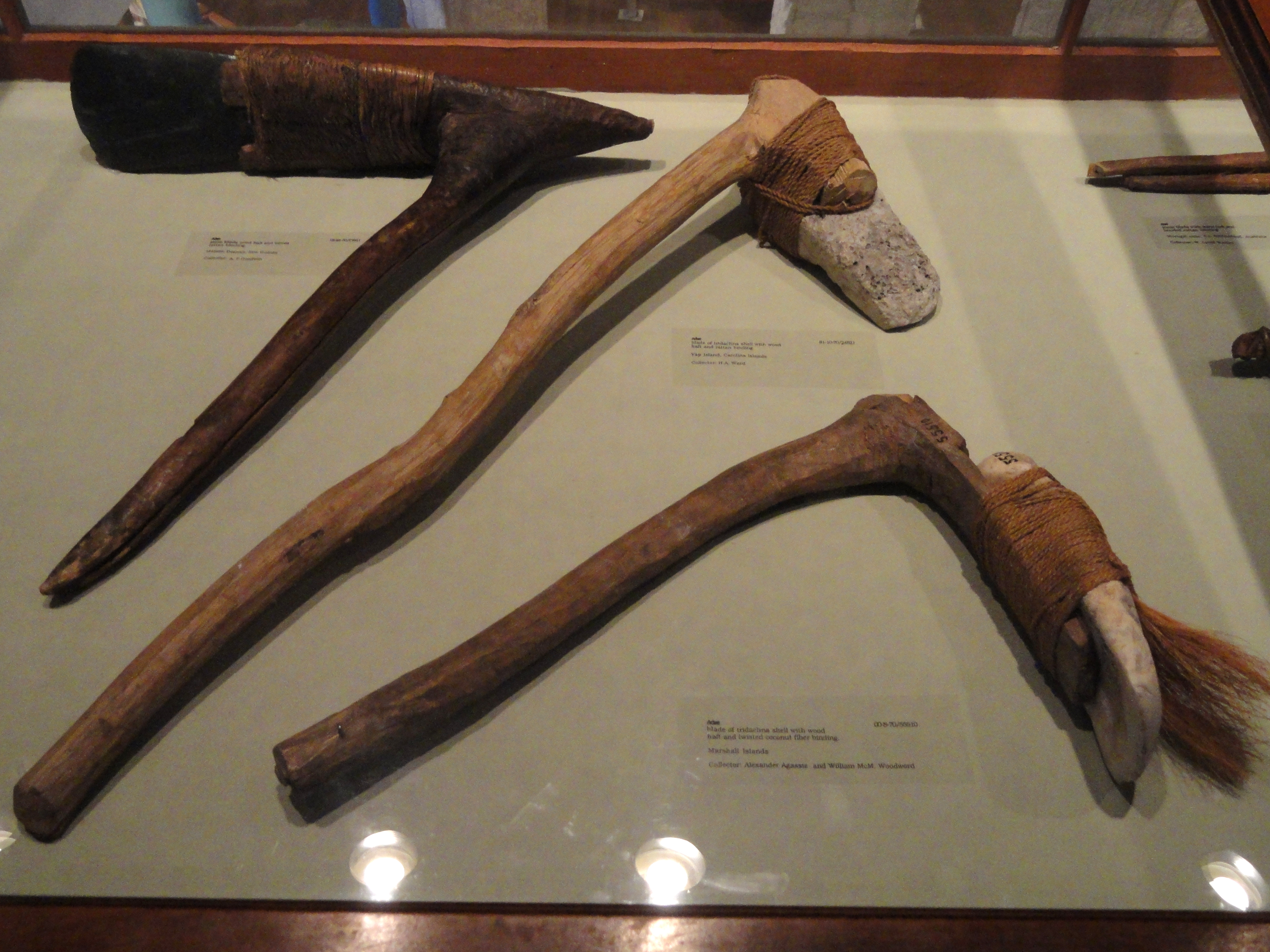
Adzes, Marshall and Yap Islands (Peabody Museum)

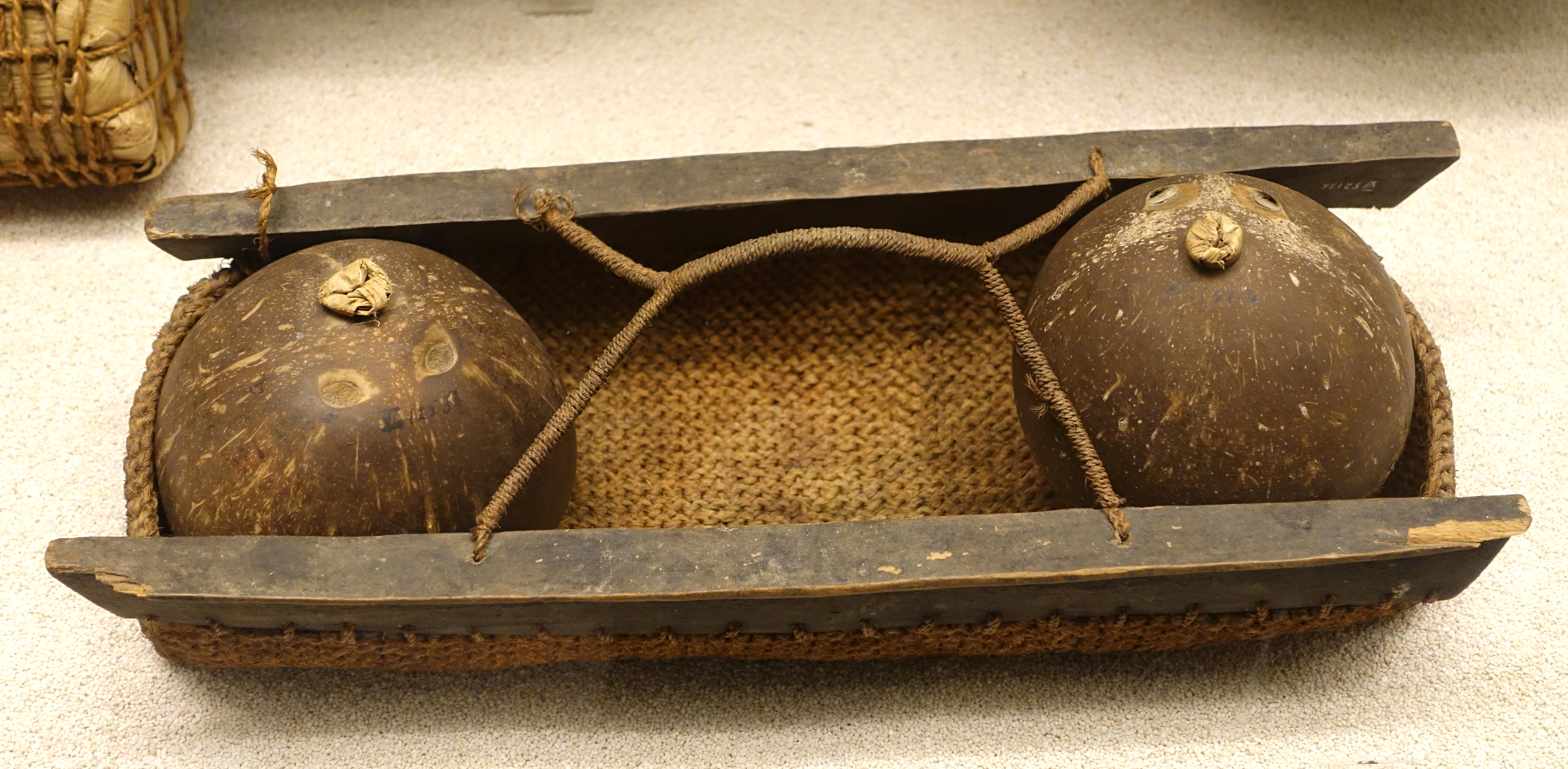
Carrying basket for water containers of coconut shell, Marshall Islands, 1895 - (Ethnological Museum, Berlin)

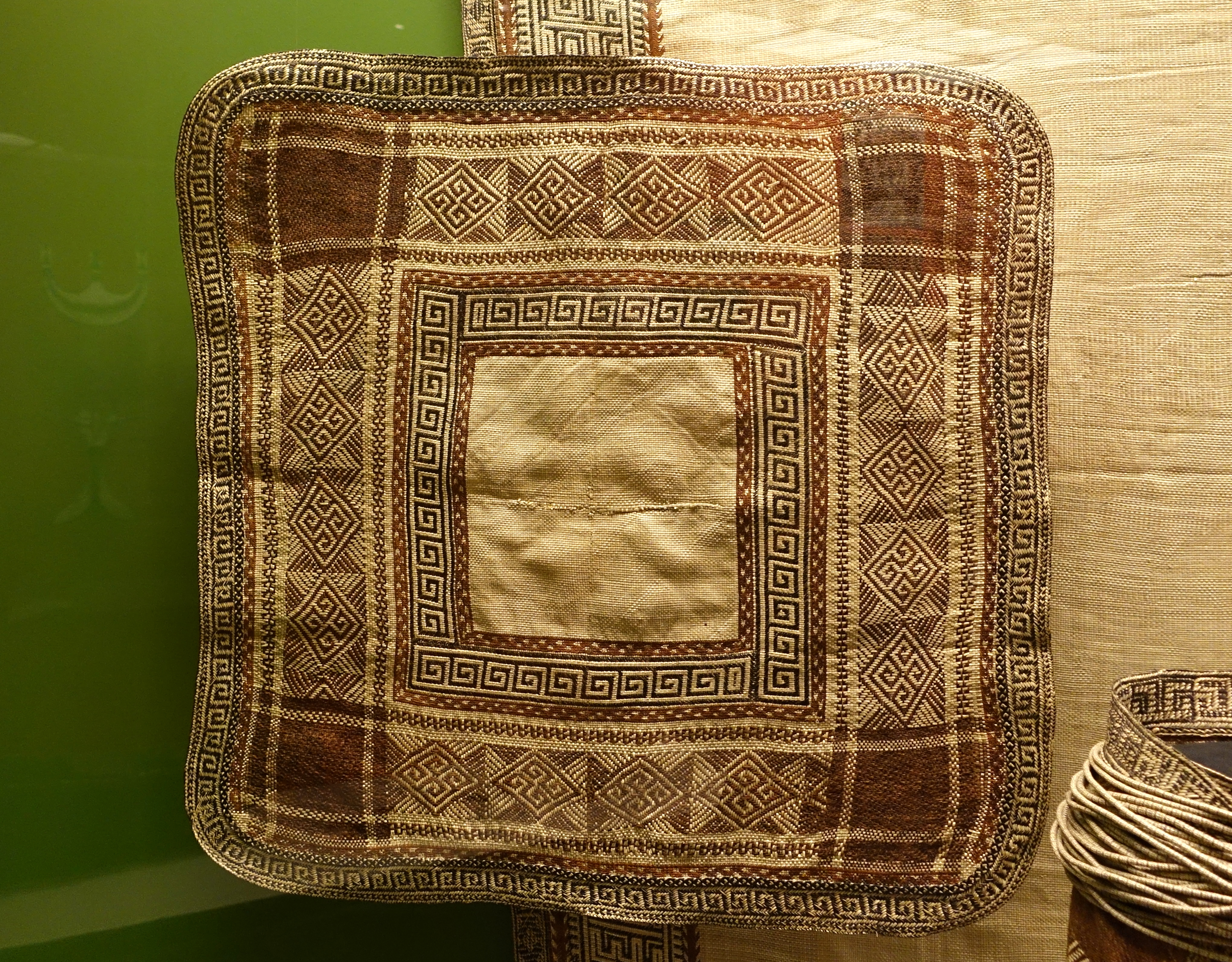
Clothing mat, Marshall Islands (Ethnological Museum, Berlin)

Plants collectioned for the United States National Museum, with surplus herbarium material sent to Honolulu Museum

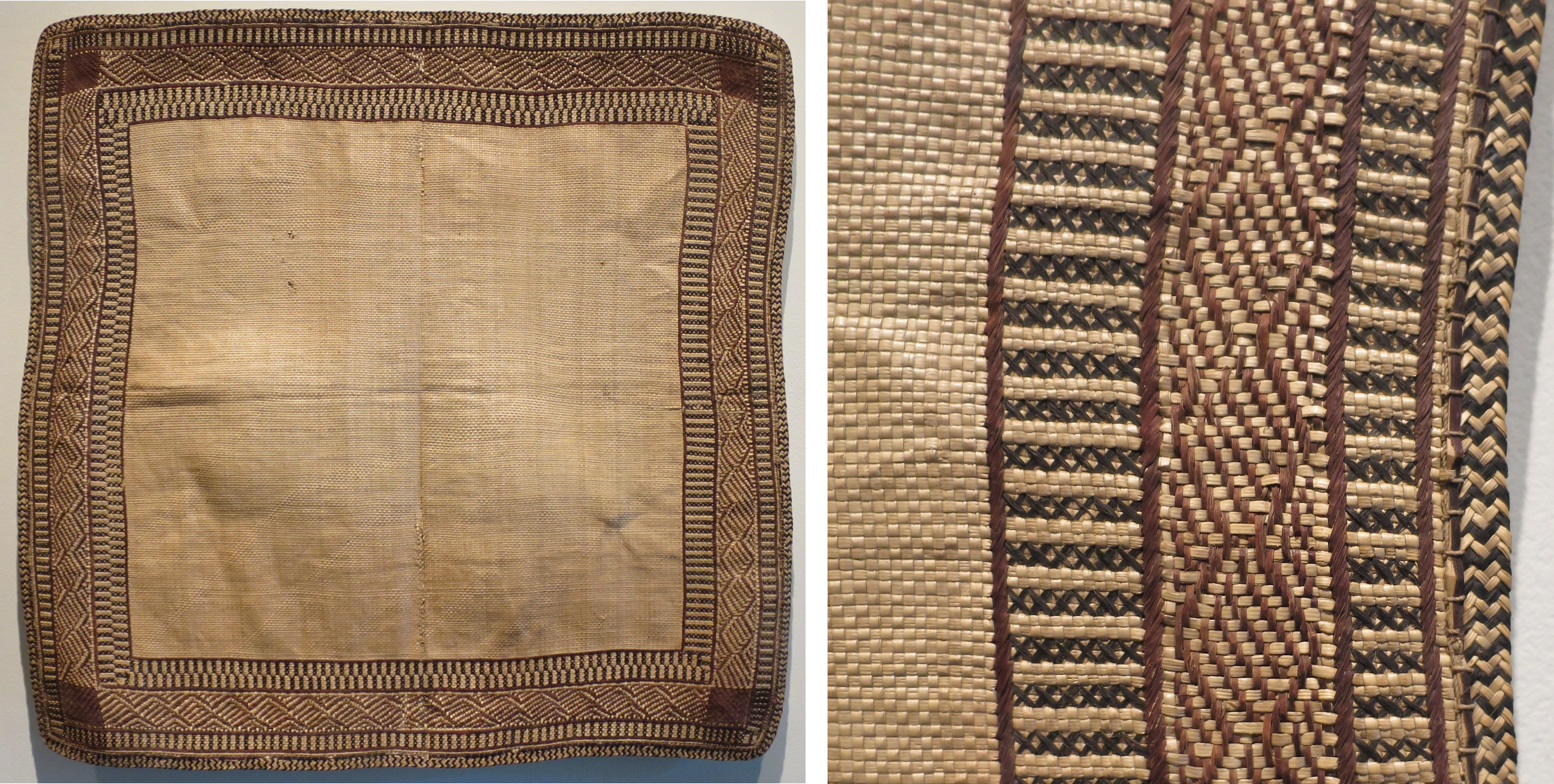
Dress mat from Marshall Islands, Honolulu Museum of Art

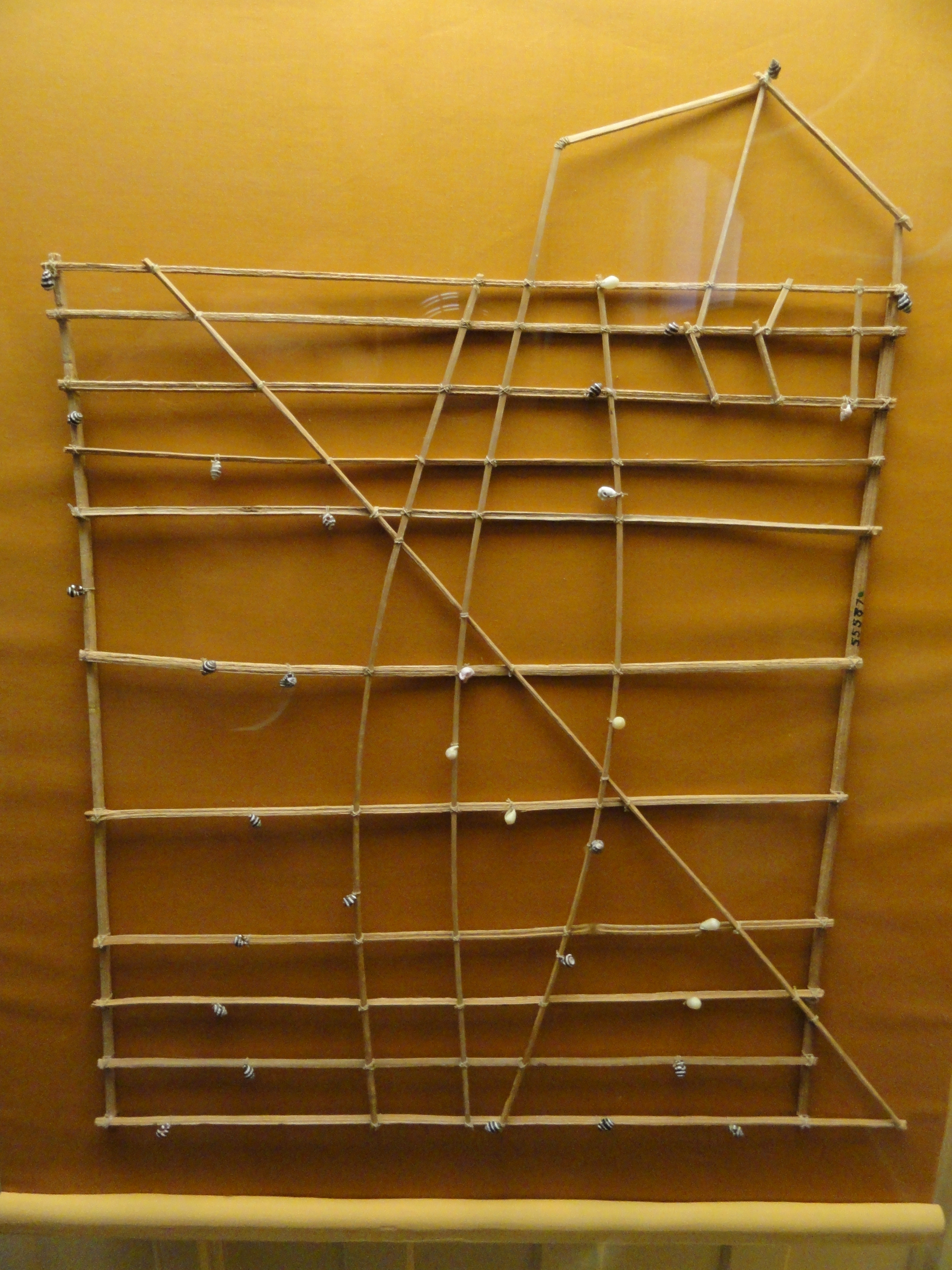
Stick chart, Marshall Islands - Pacific collection - Peabody Museum

== Library ==
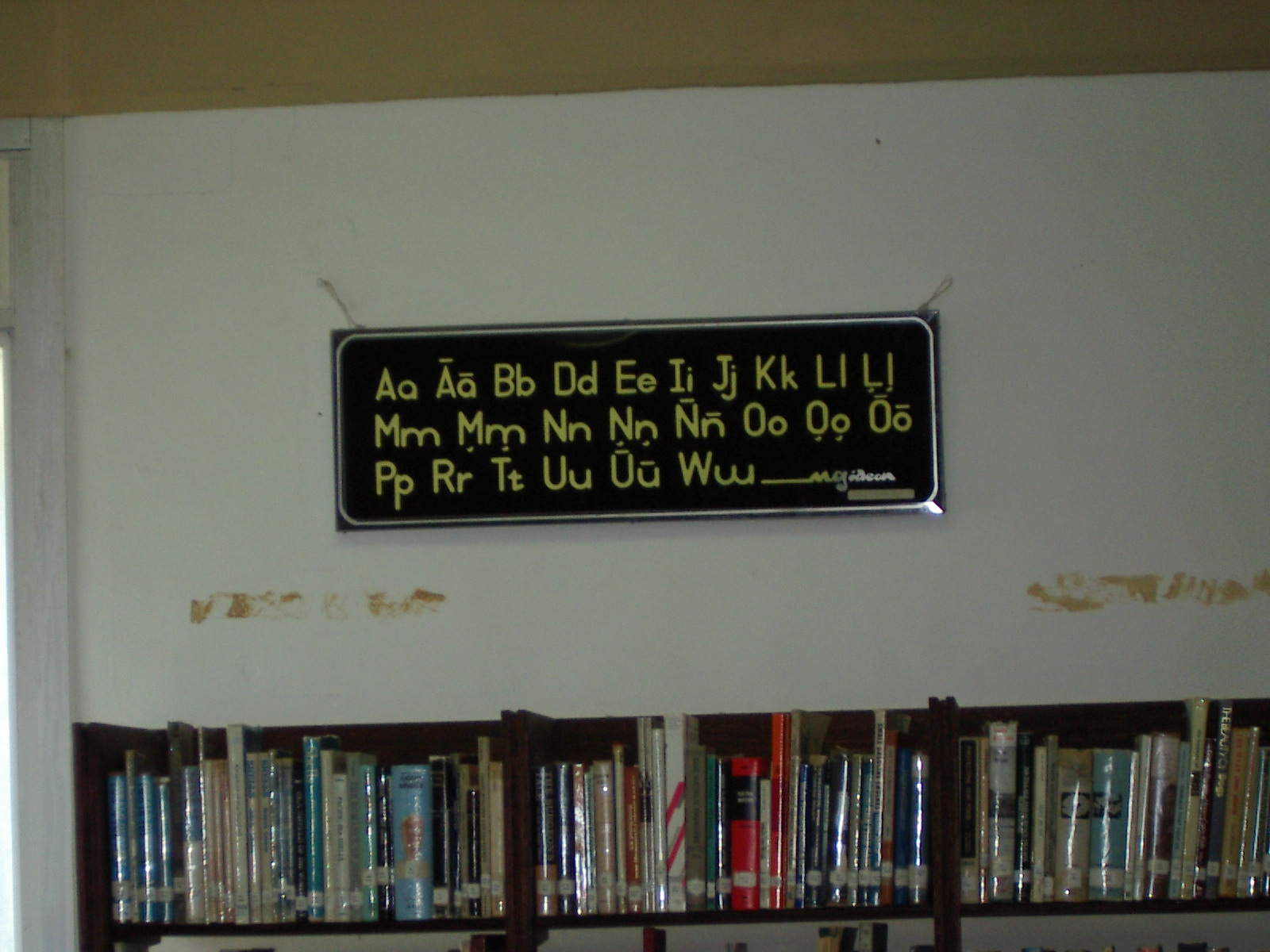
Marshallese alphabet displayed in library in 2002.

The library is located on the second floor of the building; it has a dedicated area for children's literature, as well as a Pacific section. The library has a strong research collection that focuses on the Marshall Islands. It also supports computer literacy, through learning programmes.

== Archive ==
In the 1980s, under a government mandate, the National Archives were located at Alele Museum. The archive has a large microfilm collection. The archive also has an internationally significant collection of video recordings of islands life from the 1980s to the 2000s. The archive began a digitisation project in 2017.

The Joachim de Brum photographic collection and archive is also on loan to the organisation. This collection consists of the papers and glass plate negatives belonging to the de Brum family, who are descended from Jose de Brum, one of the first Portuguese settlers and his wife, Likemeto, the daughter of the former Irooj of Likiep. This archive provides a unique insight into Marshallese life in the nineteenth century.

== Former directors ==
- Gerald R. Knight
- Melvin Majmeto
- Wisse Amram
- Bernice Joash
