= V7AB =

- Majuro; Marshall Islands
- Frequency: 1098 kHz

Programming
- Format: Public/Community radio

Technical information
- Power: 5,000 watts

V7AB (A.M. 1098 kHz) is a radio station at Majuro, Marshall Islands. It operates at a power of 5,000 watts and airs a public/community format.

As of 2023, it was the only station in the country with national coverage.
