= Kennemerland =

Coastal region in North Holland, the Netherlands

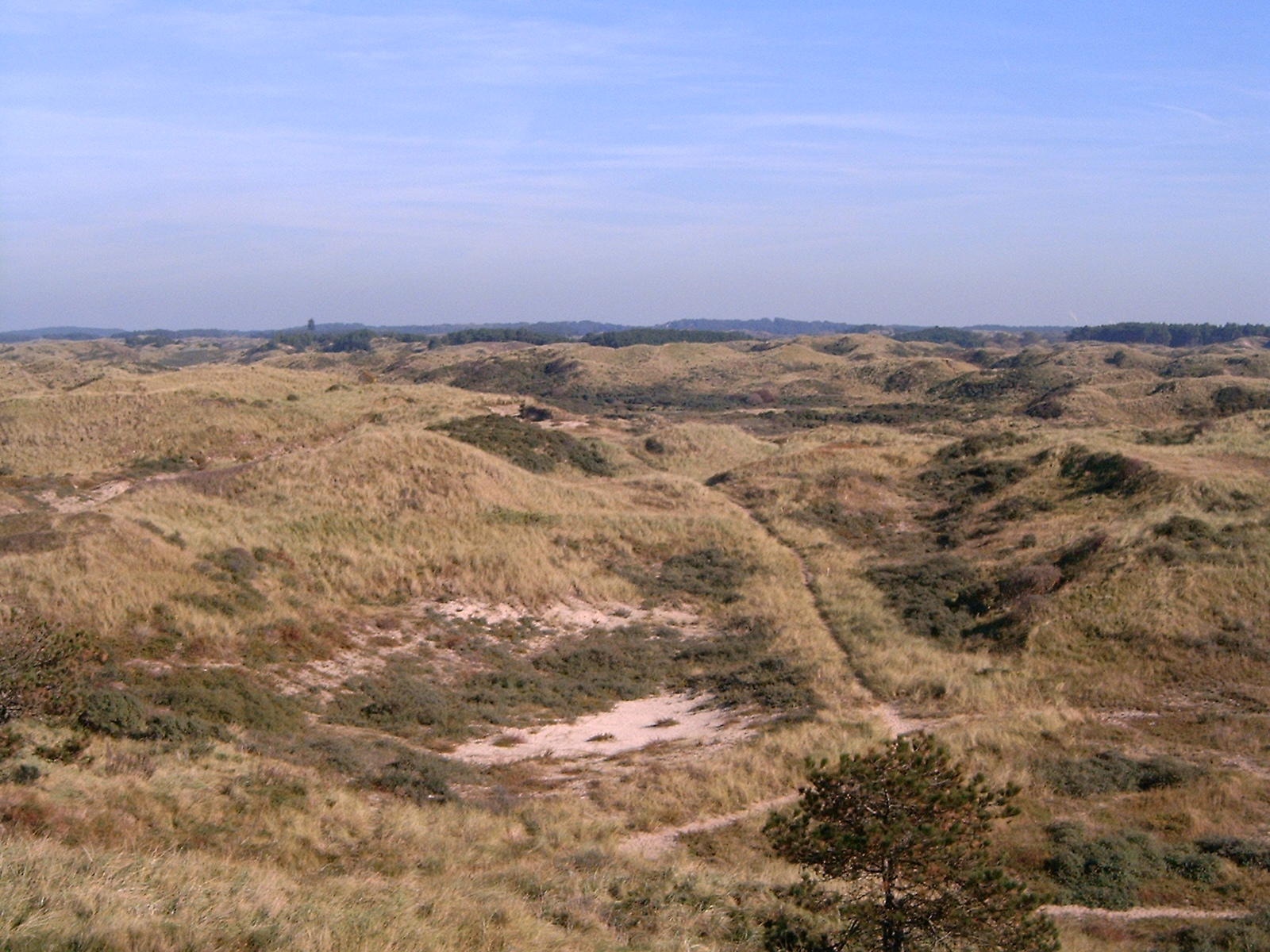
The dunes of Kennemerland as they have been since the Kennemers lived there.

Kennemerland (Dutch pronunciation: [ˌkɛnəmərˈlɑnt]) is a coastal region in the northwestern Netherlands, in the province of North Holland. It includes the sand dunes north of the North Sea Canal, as well as the dunes of Zuid-Kennemerland National Park.

== History ==
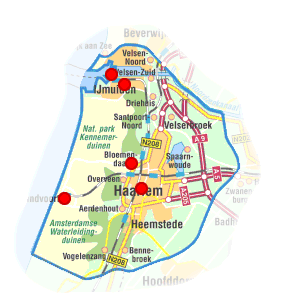
The term Kennemerland is mostly used to define the immediate surroundings of Haarlem.

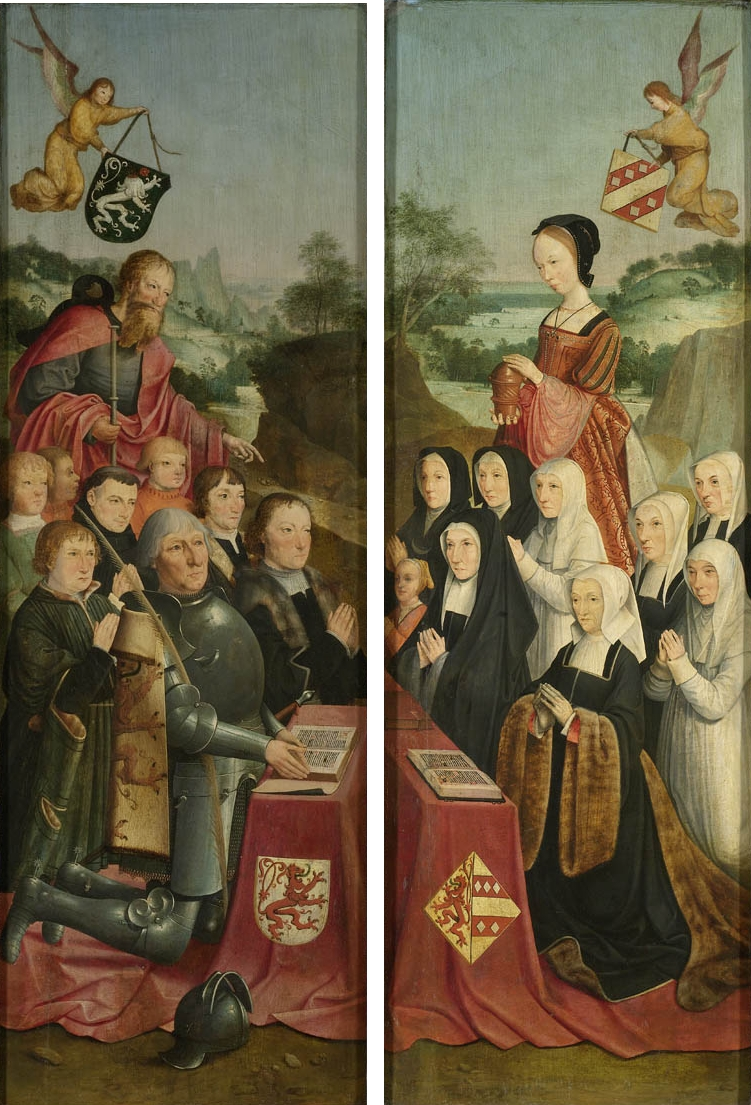
Two panels by the Master of Alkmaar dated 1490–1510, with a Kennemer dunescape in the background.

Kennemerland gets its name from the Kennemer people, Frisians who fought unsuccessfully with the Counts of Holland in the Middle Ages. The name is said to derive from the Canninefates. Because of the wars and the Dutch rerouting of waterways, the original borders of Kennemerland have been lost. During the 20th century, the term Kennemerland was redefined to denote municipal regions of North Holland. Because the Kennemers, according to folklore, were always on the attack, many sports teams in Haarlem are called Kennemers.

Precisely who the Kennemer people were is unclear. The knights of Kennemerlant, as the area was then called, quarrelled continually over trading rights and land ownership. The local farmers who paid rent were often asked for goods from either Egmond Abbey or their local church, as well as from these knights. In North Holland during the years 900–1300, castles were often built and later destroyed, and archaeologists today are still trying to piece together evidence.

== Municipalities located in Kennemerland today ==
On this map of the province of North Holland, the green areas show today the areas of North, Middle and South Kennemerland, while only the darker green region is roughly the original area of Kennemerland (excluding land that was formerly water and has since been pumped dry).

=== North Kennemerland ===
- Alkmaar (partly also in West Frisia)
- Dijk en Waard (the area of the former municipality of Heerhugowaard) (located completely in West Frisia)
- Bergen (including Egmond, former seat of the Counts of Holland)
- Castricum
- Heiloo
- Uitgeest

=== Middle Kennemerland (IJmond) ===
- Beverwijk
- Heemskerk
- Velsen

=== South Kennemerland ===
- Bloemendaal, with Thijsse's Hof (Garden of Thijsse), a wildlife garden with native plants of South Kennemerland.
- Haarlem (capital of North Holland)
- Haarlemmermeer
- Heemstede
- Zandvoort

== See also ==
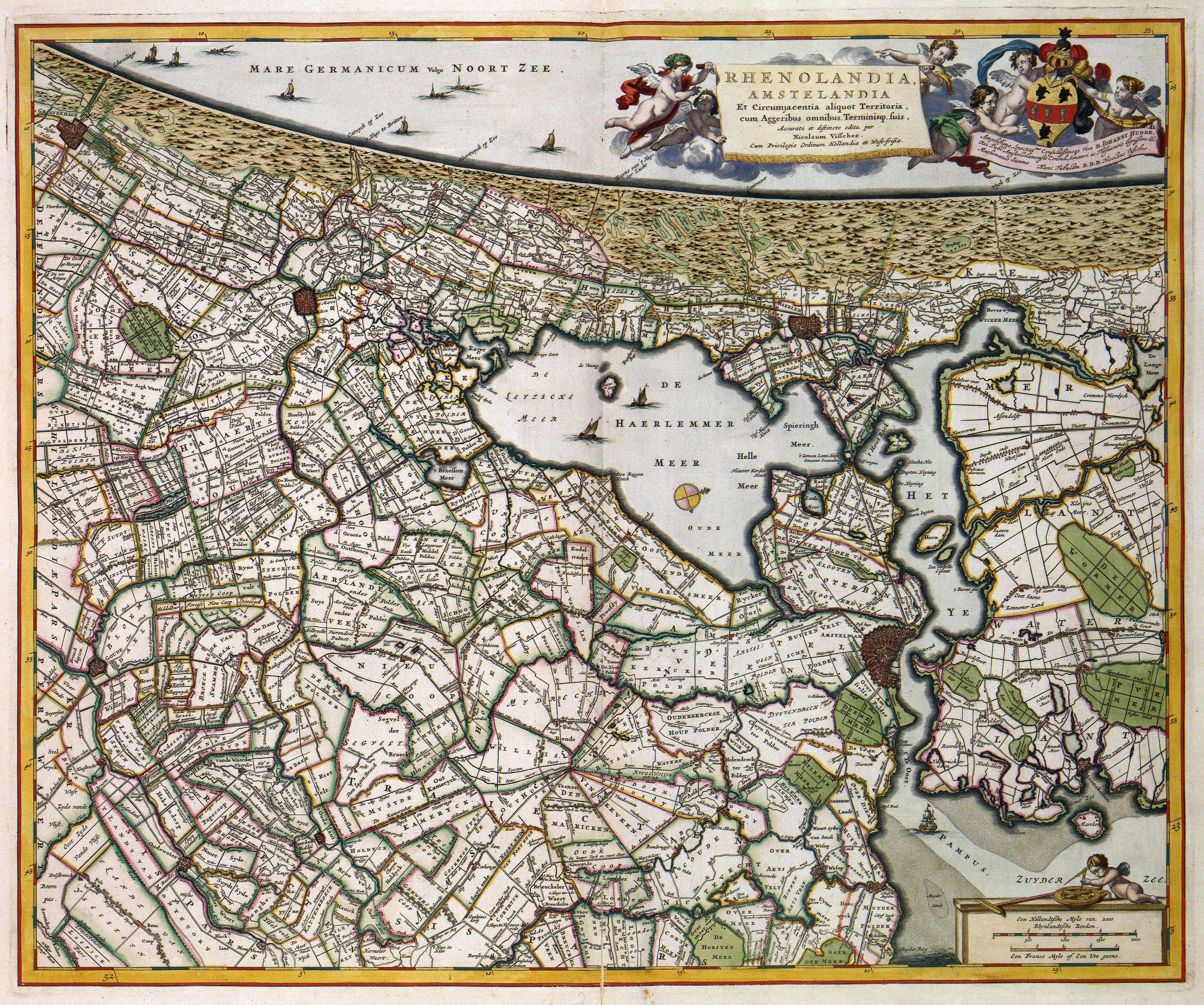
Map from 1681 showing the area of Kennemerlant at the top.

- Gijsbrecht van Aemstel (play)
- Zuid-Kennemerland National Park
- Godfrid, Duke of Frisia
- Floris V, Count of Holland
