= Bloemendaal aan Zee =

- Coastal resort
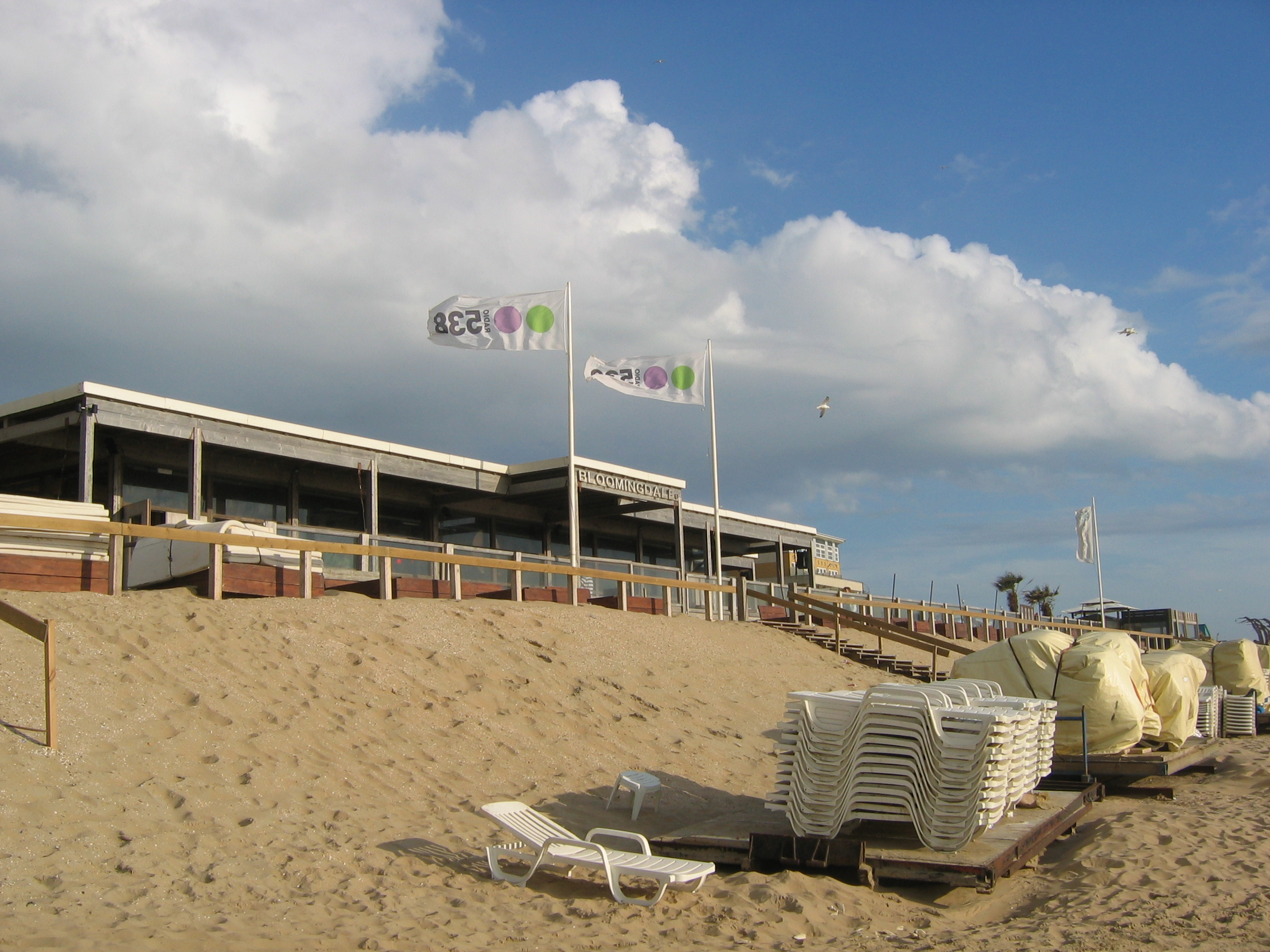
- A beach pavilion at Bloemendaal aan Zee
- Interactive map of Bloemendaal aan Zee
- Coordinates: 52°23′42″N 4°32′16″E
- Country: Netherlands
- Province: North Holland
- Municipality: Bloemendaal

Bloemendaal aan Zee is a seaside resort and neighbourhood in the municipality Bloemendaal, in North Holland province, the Netherlands. It is between the beaches of IJmuiden to the north and Zandvoort to the south and surrounded by the dunes of the Zuid-Kennemerland National Park.

Like Zandvoort, it is a popular beach destination. It has a 4.3 kilometers (2.7 mi) sandy beach, including a 1 kilometer (0.6 mi) nude beach. In summer the roads to Zandvoort and Bloemendaal are busy, but many consider it worthwhile and take the traffic jams for granted.

In June 2007, the Freestyle Frisbee World Championships were held on the beach of Bloemendaal aan Zee.

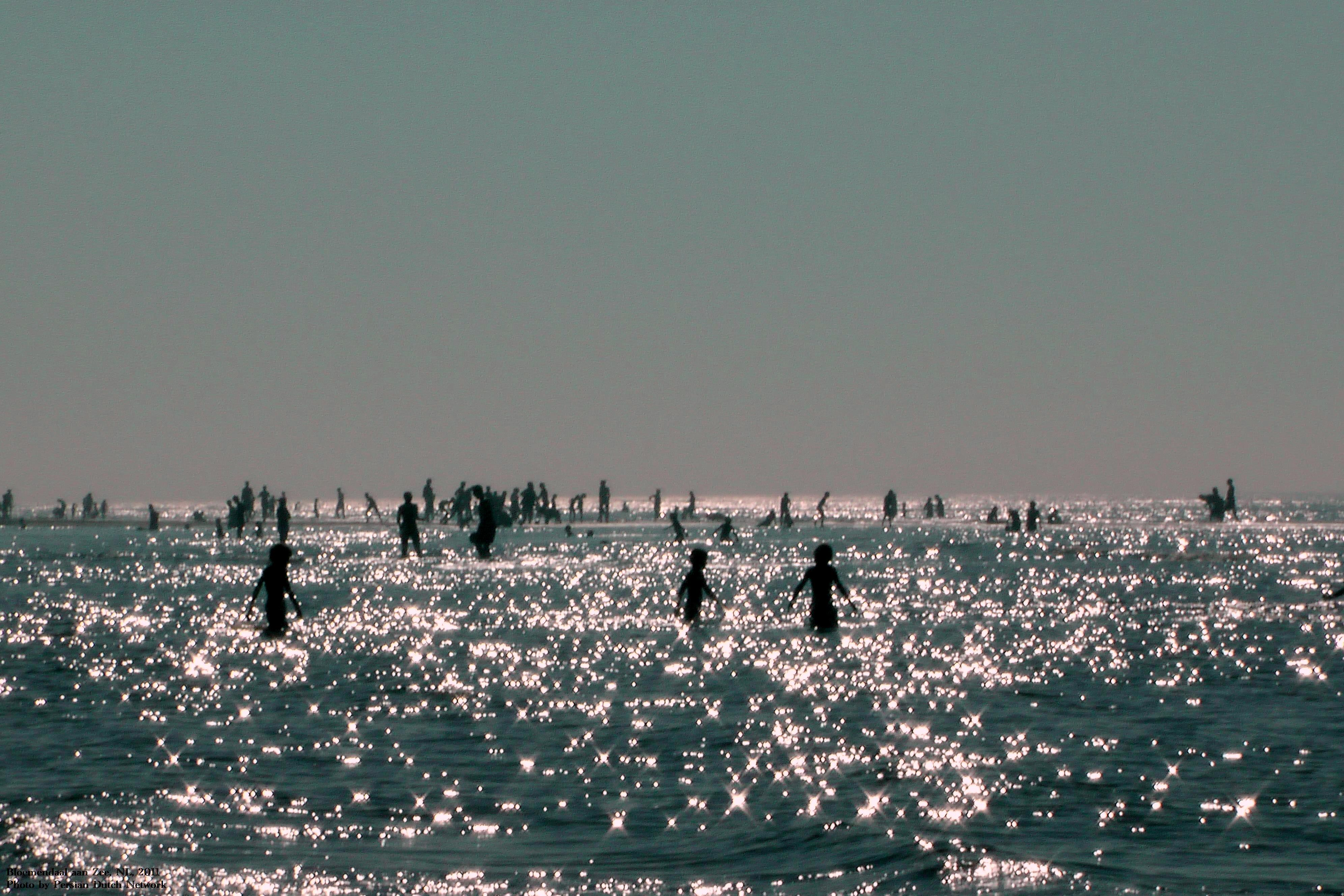
Bloemendaal aan Zee, 2011

== Attractions ==
- Plenty of beach clubs
- Mobile stands with excellent seafood
- Naturist (nudist) beach
