= Zuid-Kennemerland National Park =

Conservation area in North Holland, the Netherlands

- Nationaal Park Zuid-Kennemerland
- IUCN category II (national park)
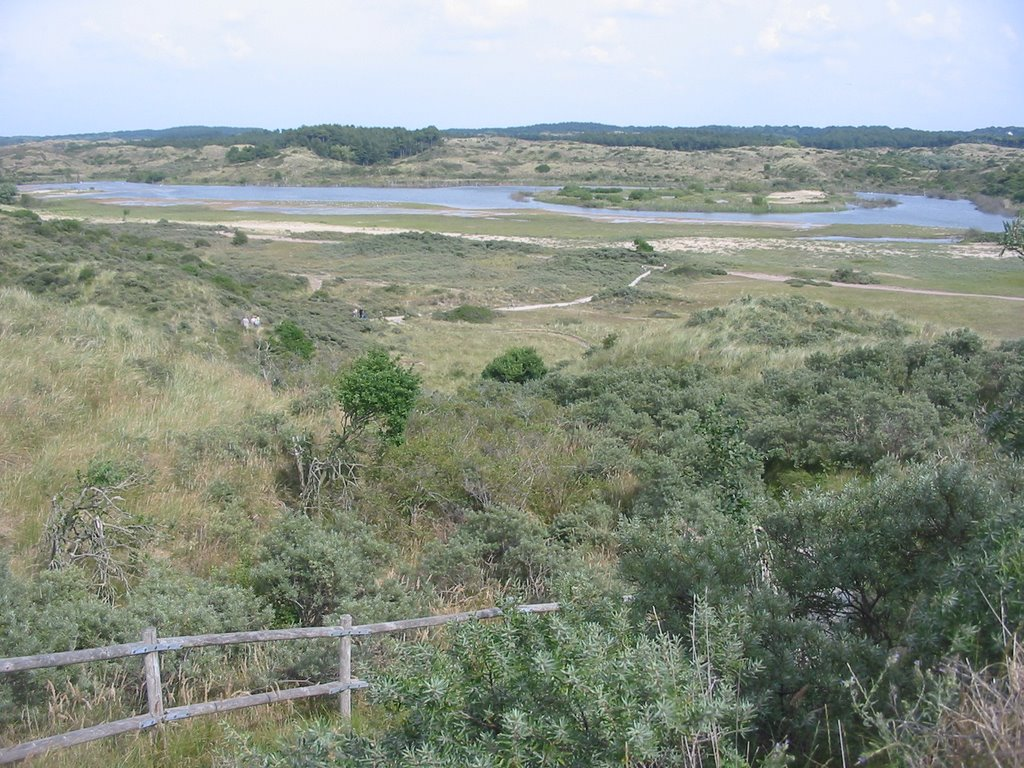
- Dunes in Zuid-Kennemerland National Park

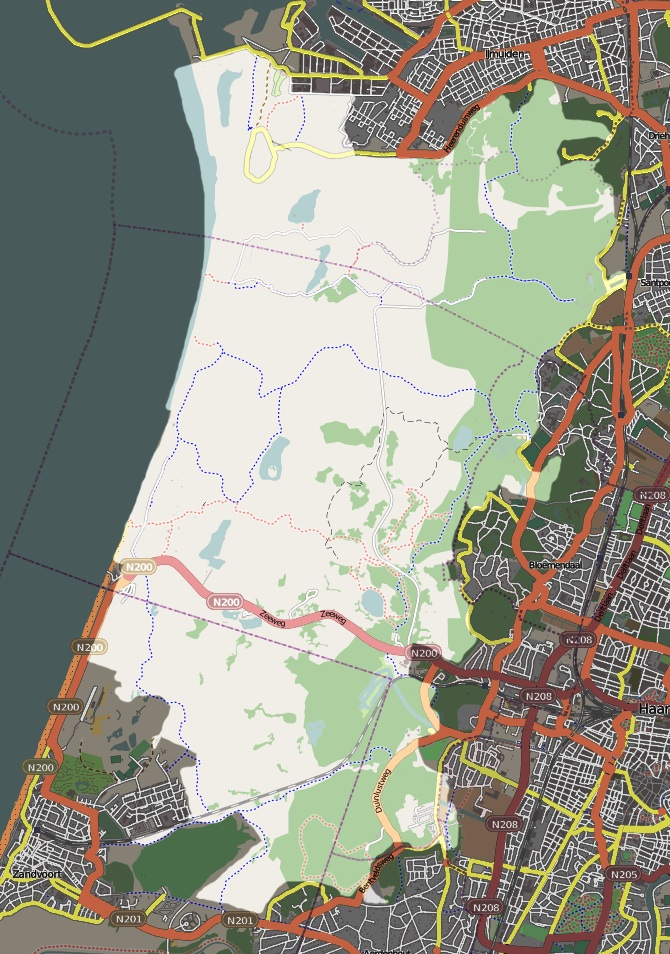
- Map of the national park
- Location: North Holland, Netherlands
- Nearest city: Haarlem
- Coordinates: 52°25′N 4°35′E
- Area: 3,800 ha (9,400 acres)
- Established: 1995
- Visitors: 1.8 million (in 2008)
- Website: www.np-zuidkennemerland.nl

Zuid-Kennemerland National Park (Dutch: Nationaal Park Zuid-Kennemerland) is a conservation area on the west coast of the province of North Holland. It was established in 1995.

== History ==
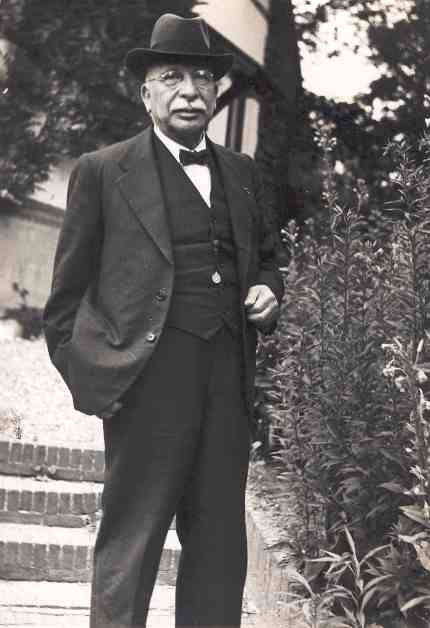
Jac. P. Thijsse

Dutch conservationist Jac. P. Thijsse first wrote about a possible national park between Bloemendaal and the North Sea Canal in 1944. As a result, the national park De Kennemerduinen was established in 1950.

The Zuid-Kennemerland National Park was established in 1995. It comprised De Kennemerduinen, several nature reserves managed by Vereniging Natuurmonumenten and some other areas.

== Geography ==
The park is situated west of Haarlem in the province of North Holland in the west of the Netherlands. It is located within the municipalities of Bloemendaal, Velsen, and Zandvoort. It includes the southern portion of the region known as Kennemerland.

South Kennemerland is characterized by sand dunes. The park, about 38 square kilometres (15 sq mi) in size, also includes some estates, forests on the dune fringes, and coastal beaches. The dunes used to be a watershed for the city of Haarlem. Large amounts have been won for consumption. In 2003, these activities were ceased, allowing the groundwater-bubble to grow again. There is a small public swimming area open in the summer at a location called the Wed on the road between Bloemendaal and Zandvoort. The train from Zandvoort to Amsterdam travels through the park.

The park borders and is connected with the Amsterdam Water Supply Dunes (Amsterdamse Waterleidingduinen) another big reserve owned by Amsterdam. This reserve is about the same size, with a similar ecosystem and wildlife; together they form one big dune ecosystem.

== Management ==
The park is owned and managed collectively by Vereniging Natuurmonumenten (Natural Monuments Association), Staatsbosbeheer (State Forestry), PWN (Water Supply Company North Holland), Province of North Holland, IVN, and the surrounding municipalities and private owners.

== Visitors ==
In 2008, the park had 1.8 million visitors.

The visitors centre is located in at Zeeweg 12 in Overveen, called De Kennemerduinen, next to parking Koevlak.

== Biology ==
=== Flora ===
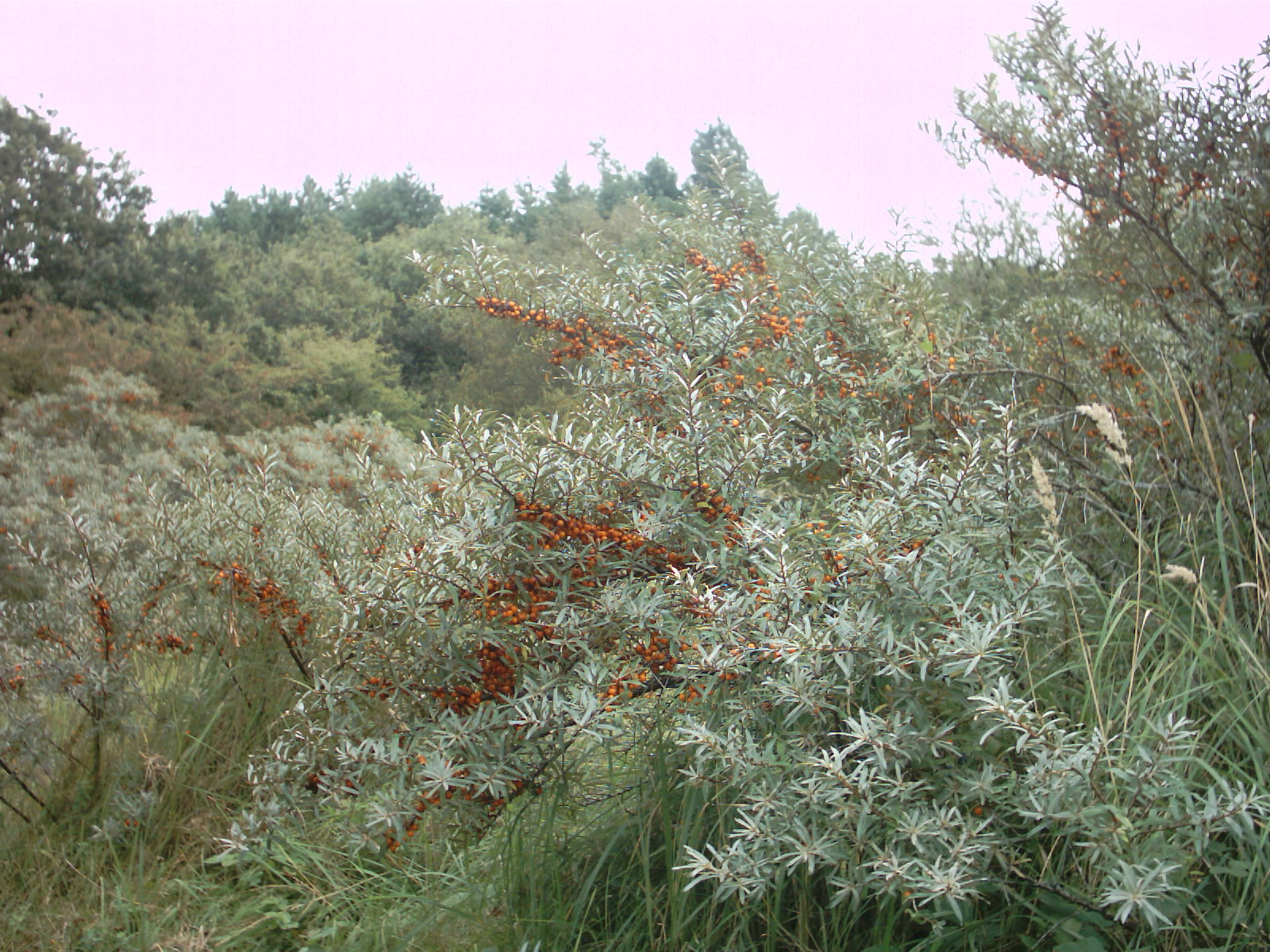
Sea buckthorn in the park

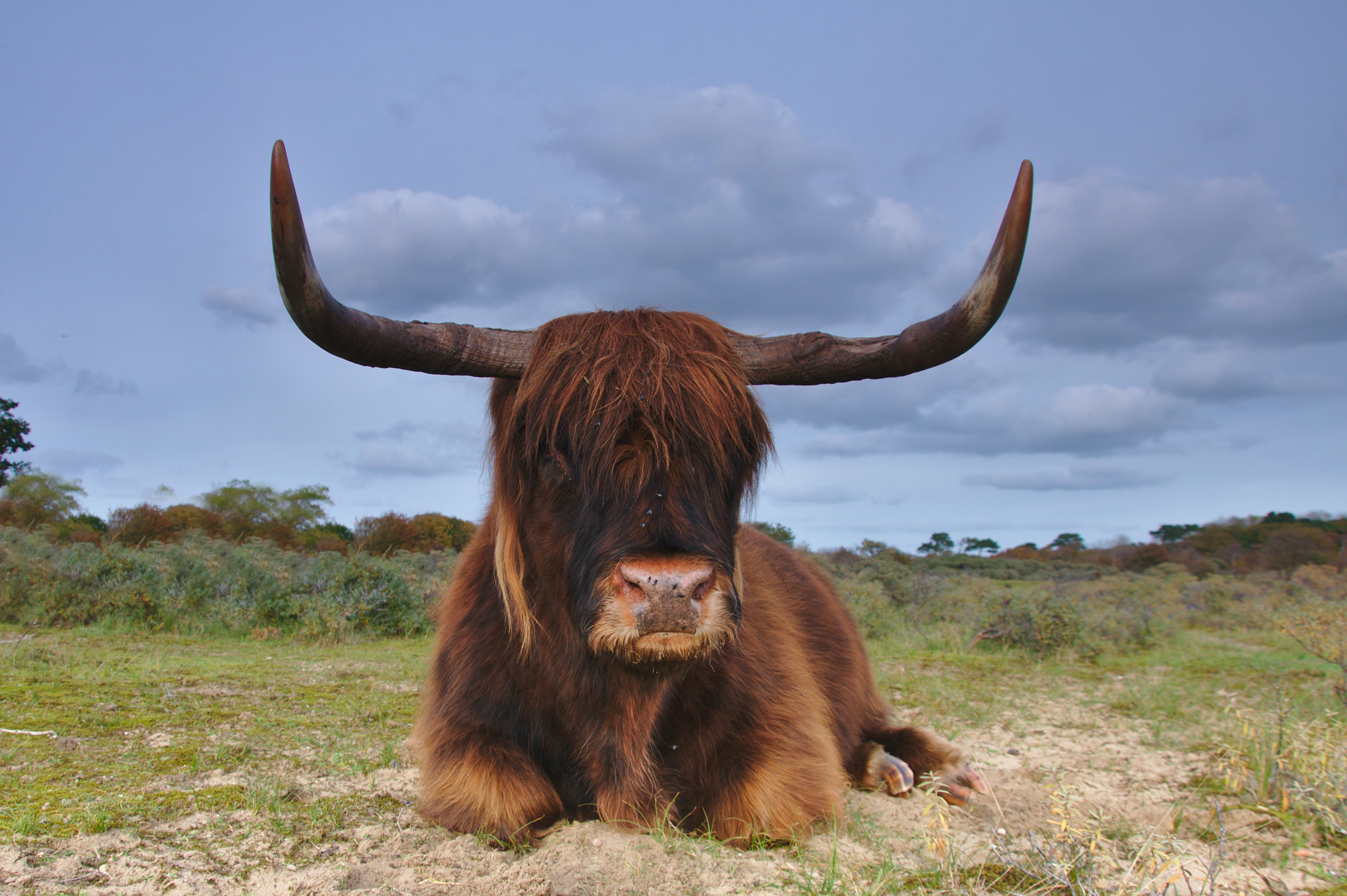
Highland cattle in the park

The dunes are rich in lime, allowing the growth of several plant species which are rare in the Netherlands. The inland dunes are covered with bacciferous shrubs attracting a variety of songbirds.

About 800 different plant species that grow in the dune area of South Kennemerland are displayed in Thijsse's Hof (Garden of Thijsse), in Bloemendaal. This wildlife garden was founded in 1925, and is the oldest in the Netherlands.

=== Fauna ===
Over 100 bird species, as well as nearly 20 butterfly species, have been observed in the park.

The mammals fallow deer, roe deer, squirrel, West European hedgehog, European rabbit, red fox live in the park.

Besides Highland cattle, Shetland pony, and Koniks, an experiment was started in spring 2007 by releasing a small number of wisents. These European bison could be dangerous to people and therefore were released in an area not publicly accessible. The wisents may be observed from a purpose-built viewing platform, a walking path (closed between 1 March and 1 September and during excursions).

Together with Amsterdamse Waterleiding Duinen reserve, this park could potentially be a suitable habitat for wolves (who can help tackle deer populations on a natural way) say multiple wolf experts including those of ark nature development, who work closely with the park and with the biggest wolf organization in the Netherlands: “wolven in Nederland”.

The park also is interested in the possibility of a reintroduction of lynxes in the park to help the deer populations. The upcoming golden jackal also might find the park for the first time ever.

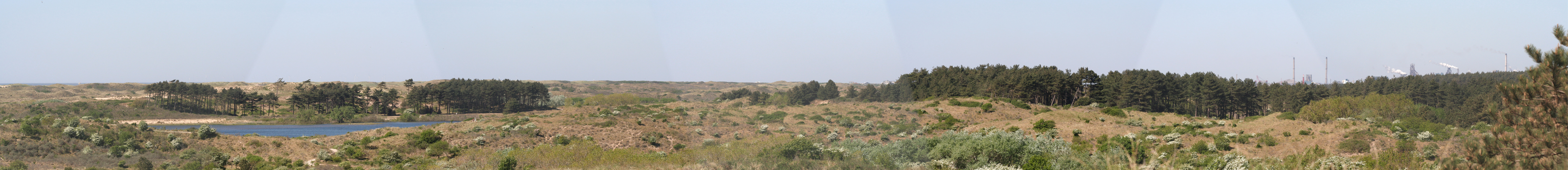
View of Vogelmeer (Bird Lake) and surroundings
