= Johannes Bernardus Bernink =

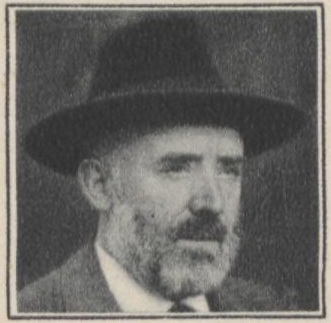

Johannes Bernardus Bernink (January 24, 1878 – April 18, 1954) was a Dutch teacher and naturalist who established Natura Docet ("nature teaches"), the first Dutch natural history museum in Denekamp in 1911. With the motto of "seeing is learning", he pioneered nature education in the Netherlands during an era that is known as biologisch reveil.

Bernink was born in Denekamp, son of shoemaker Gerardus and his wife Lena née Kokkelder, and after attending the normal school in Oldenzaal he became a village school teacher in Denekamp in 1897. As a child he took an interest in plants and collected natural history specimens. He set up a herbarium of the local plants. In 1898 he met Eli Heimans (1861–1914) and Jacobus Pieter Thijsse (1865–1945) who were amateur biologists involved in developing nature study. Their magazine De Levende Natuur ("The Living Nature") was very popular and Bernink wrote in it on the plants of Denekamp. The area gained attention and many people visited including Hugo de Vries who came along with his students in 1907. In 1911 he started a museum in Denekamp called Natura Docet. It was supported by industrialists from Twente and he ran it with a membership and entrance fees. It gathered a large collection thanks to amateurs and had a large library. In 1922, it was moved to a larger museum building. In 1936 it also gathered a geology room and in the same year he was appointed knight in the Order of Orange-Nassau. It also set up a nature reserve the Vives and excursions were organized for students. In 1946 Bernink was made an honorary member of the Royal Dutch Natural History Society. In 1954 the museum was managed by his daughter Heleen who was also a school teacher.
