= Michel Rog =

Dutch politician (born 1973)

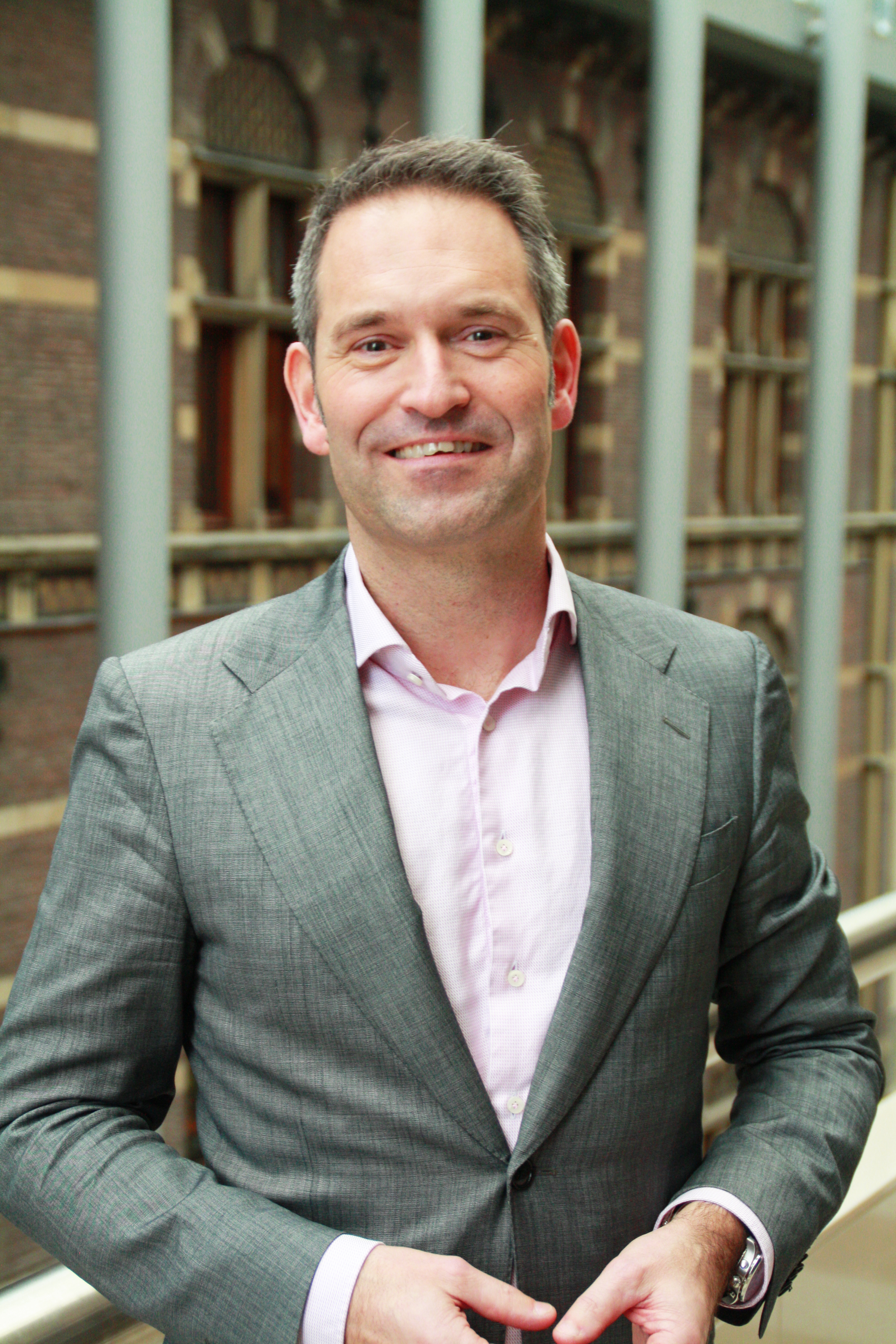

Member of the House of Representatives
- In office 20 September 2012 – 12 January 2021

Personal details
- Born: Michel Richard Joachim Rog; 3 April 1973 (age 53) 's-Hertogenbosch, Netherlands
- Party: Democrats 66 (until 2006); Christian Democratic Appeal (2012–2023); New Social Contract (since 2023)

Michel Richard Joachim Rog (born 3 April 1973) is a Dutch politician and former trade union leader who served as a member of the House of Representatives from 2012 to 2021. A member of Democrats 66 (D66) until 2006, he joined the Christian Democratic Appeal (CDA) in 2012. He served as alderman in the municipal executive of Haarlem between 2020 and 2021. Moving to the new New Social Contract political party in August 2023, he became mayor of Bloemendaal, North Holland, in October 2024.

== Career ==
Rog worked as a teacher of civics. Succeedingly he worked as a team leader civil aviation for trade union De Unie from 1999 to 2006. He was a member of the council of the former Amsterdam borough De Baarsjes from 2002 to 2006, where he led the Democrats 66 party group. From 2006 he was working as a board member and from 2008 as president of CNV Onderwijs, the teachers' union of the Christian National Trade Union Federation (Christelijk Nationaal Vakverbond).

He entered the House of Representatives after he was placed fifth on the Christian Democratic Appeal list in the 2012 general election led by Sybrand van Haersma Buma. He was reelected in the 2017 general election, but resigned his seat in 2021 after he was inaugurated as the alderman of Haarlem for finance, sport and public space on 17 December 2020. In October 2021, he resigned as alderman after criticising the country's COVID pass policy and refusing to have his COVID pass scanned at a neighbourhood meeting.

In August 2023, Rog announced he had joined New Social Contract, a new political party founded by fellow former CDA member Pieter Omtzigt. In October 2024 he was appointed mayor of Bloemendaal, a municipality in the province of North Holland.

== Personal life ==
Michel Rog is married and has two sons. He lives in Haarlem.

== Decorations ==
Honours
| Ribbon bar | Honour | Country | Date | Comment |
|---|---|---|---|---|
| | Knight of the Order of Orange-Nassau | Netherlands | 12 January 2021 | |
