= Vereniging Natuurmonumenten =

Dutch conservation organization

- Founded: 22 April 1905; 121 years ago
- Founders: Jacobus Thijsse, Eli Heimans
- Purpose: Nature conservation
- Headquarters: Amersfoort, Utrecht
- Region served: Netherlands
- Members: 735,000 (2013 est.)
- Volunteers: 2,250 (2010 est.)
- Award: Gouden Ganzenveer (1986)
- Website: natuurmonumenten.nl

Vereniging tot Behoud van Natuurmonumenten in Nederland (English: Society for Preservation of Nature Monuments in the Netherlands), also known as Vereniging Natuurmonumenten, is a Dutch nature conservation organization founded in 1905 by Jacobus Pieter Thijsse and Eli Heimans, that buys, protects, and manages nature reserves in the Netherlands. It is a member of the European Environmental Bureau.

The first area that the organization purchased in 1905 was to protect the Naardermeer, southeast of Amsterdam. It had 355 sites under its management in 2010, with a total area of 1,029.51 km^{2} (397.50 sq mi). The largest is De Wieden (58.47 km^{2} (22.58 sq mi)); the smallest is Fort Ellewoutsdijk (0.01 km^{2} (0.0039 sq mi)).

The organization also owns 1,700 buildings, of which 250 were provincial or national monuments. In 2013, the organization had 735,000 members and was headquartered in 's-Graveland. The organisation moved their headquarters to Amersfoort at the end of 2020.

The organization was awarded the Gouden Ganzenveer in 1986.
