= North Holland =

Province of the Netherlands

North Holland Noord-Holland (Dutch)
- Province
- Province of North Holland; Provincie Noord-Holland (Dutch)
- Flag Coat of arms Brandmark
- Anthem: "Noord-Hollands Volkslied" (Anthem of North Holland)
- Location of North Holland in the Netherlands

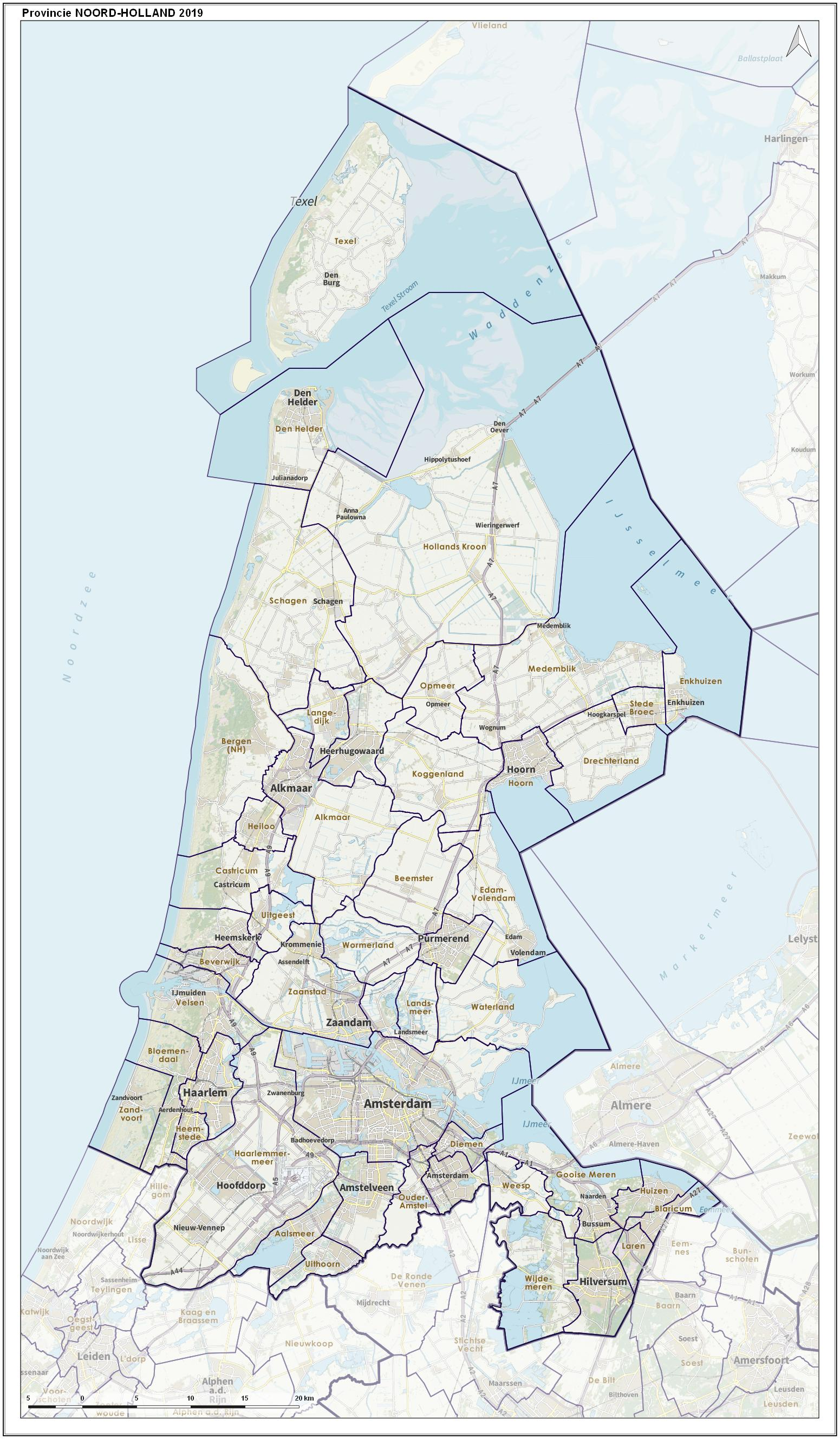
- Topography map of North Holland
- Coordinates: 52°40′N 4°50′E
- Country: Netherlands
- Established: 1840 (division of Holland)
- Capital: Haarlem
- Largest city: Amsterdam

Government
  - King's Commissioner: Arthur van Dijk (VVD)
  - Council: States of North Holland

Area (2023)
  - Total: 4,092 km^{2} (1,580 sq mi)
  - Land: 2,663 km^{2} (1,028 sq mi)
  - Water: 1,429 km^{2} (552 sq mi)
  - Rank: 4th

Population (1 January 2023)
  - Total: 2,952,622
  - Rank: 2nd
  - Density: 1,109/km^{2} (2,870/sq mi)
  - Rank: 2nd

GDP
  - Total: €243.327 bn (2024)
  - Per capita: €81,326 (2024)
- Time zone: UTC+1 (CET)
  - Summer (DST): UTC+2 (CEST)
- ISO 3166 code: NL-NH
- HDI (2023): 0.964 very high · 2nd of 12
- Website: www.noord-holland.nl

North Holland (Dutch: Noord-Holland, pronounced [ˌnoːrt ˈɦɔlɑnt]) is a province of the Netherlands in the northwestern part of the country. It is located on the North Sea, north of South Holland and Utrecht, and west of Friesland and Flevoland. As of January 2023, it had a population of about 2,952,000 and a total area of 4,092 km^{2} (1,580 sq mi), of which 1,429 km^{2} (552 sq mi) is water.

From the 9th to the 16th century, the area was an integral part of the County of Holland. During this period West Friesland was incorporated. In the 17th and 18th centuries, the area was part of the province of Holland and commonly known as the Noorderkwartier ('Northern Quarter'). In 1840, the province of Holland was split into the two provinces of North Holland and South Holland. In 1855, the Haarlemmermeer was drained and turned into land.

The provincial capital is Haarlem (pop. 161,265). The province's largest city and also the largest city in the Netherlands is the Dutch capital Amsterdam, with a population of 862,965 as of November 2019. The King's Commissioner of North Holland is Arthur van Dijk, who has been serving since 2019. There are 45 municipalities and three (including parts of) water boards in the province. The busiest airport in the Netherlands and Europe's third-busiest airport, Amsterdam Airport Schiphol, is in North Holland.

== History ==
=== Emergence of a new province (1795 to 1840) ===
The province of North Holland as it is today has its origins in the period of French rule from 1795 to 1813. This was a time of bewildering changes to the Dutch system of provinces. In 1795, the old order was swept away and the Batavian Republic was established. In the Constitution enacted on 23 April 1798, the old borders were radically changed. The republic was reorganised into eight departments (département) with roughly equal populations. Holland was split up into five departments named "Texel", "Amstel", "Delf", "Schelde en Maas", and "Rijn". The first three of these lay within the borders of the old Holland; the latter two were made up of parts of different provinces. In 1801 the old borders were restored when the department of Holland was created. This reorganisation had been short-lived, but it gave birth to the concept of breaking up Holland and making it a less powerful province.

In 1807, Holland was reorganised. This time the two departments were called "Amstelland" (corresponding to the modern province of North Holland) and "Maasland" (corresponding to the modern province of South Holland). This also did not last long. In 1810, all the Dutch provinces were integrated into the French Empire. Amstelland and Utrecht were amalgamated as the department of "Zuiderzee" (Zuyderzée in French) and Maasland was renamed "Monden van de Maas" (Bouches-de-la-Meuse in French).

After the defeat of the French in 1813, this organisation remained unchanged for a year or so. When the 1814 Constitution was introduced, the country was reorganised as provinces and regions (landschappen). Zuiderzee and Monden van de Maas were reunited as the province of "Holland". One of the ministers on the constitutional committee (van Maanen) suggested that the old name "Holland and West Friesland" be reintroduced to respect the feelings of the people of that region. This proposal was rejected.

However, the division was not totally reversed. When the province of Holland was re-established in 1814, it was given two governors, one for the former department of Amstelland (area that is now North Holland) and one for the former department of Maasland (now South Holland). Even though the province had been reunited, the two areas were still being treated differently in some ways and the idea of dividing Holland remained alive. During this reorganisation the islands of Vlieland and Terschelling were returned to Holland and parts of "Hollands Brabant" (including "Land of Altena") went to North Brabant. The borders with Utrecht and Gelderland were definitively set in 1820.

When the constitutional amendments were introduced in 1840, it was decided to split Holland once again, this time into two provinces called "North Holland" and "South Holland". The need for this was not felt in South Holland or in West Friesland (which feared the dominance of Amsterdam). The impetus came largely from Amsterdam, which still resented the 1838 relocation of the court of appeal to The Hague in South Holland.

=== Urbanisation and economic growth (1840 to today) ===
After the Haarlemmermeer was drained in 1855 and turned into arable land, it was made part of North Holland. In exchange, South Holland received the greater part of the municipality of Leimuiden in 1864. In 1942, the islands Vlieland and Terschelling went back to the province of Friesland. In 1950, the former island Urk was ceded to the province of Overijssel.

In February 2011, North Holland, together with the provinces of Utrecht and Flevoland, showed a desire to investigate the feasibility of a merger between the three provinces. This has been positively received by the First Rutte cabinet, for the desire to create one Randstad province has already been mentioned in the coalition agreement. The province of South Holland, part of the Randstad urban area, visioned to be part of the Randstad province, and very much supportive of the idea of a merger into one province. With or without South Holland, if created, the new province would be the largest in the Netherlands in both area and population.

== Geography ==
Satellite image of North Holland, Friesland, and Flevoland

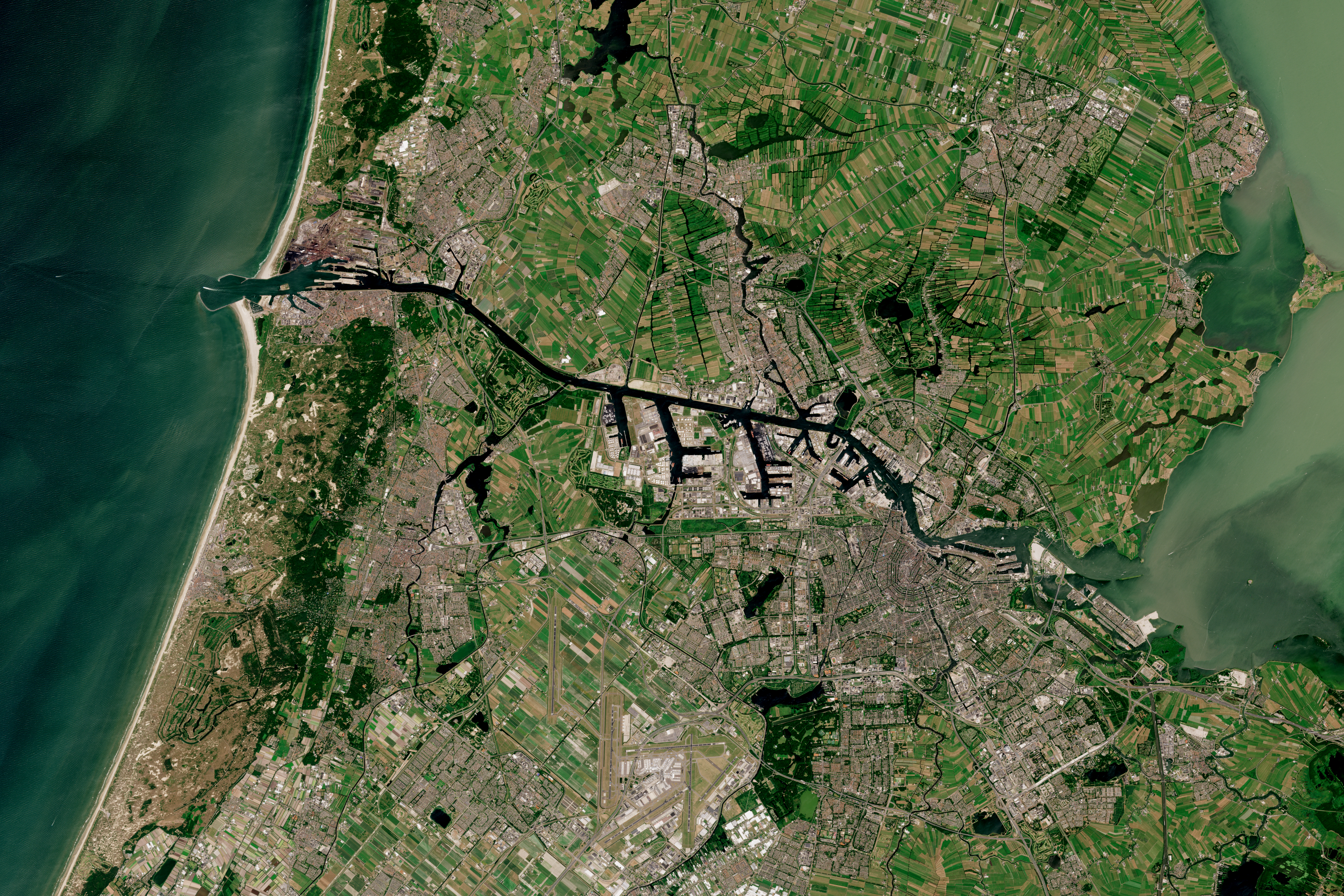
Satellite image of the south of North Holland

North Holland is situated at 52°40′N 4°50′E in the northwest of the Netherlands with to the northeast the province of Friesland, to the east the province of Flevoland, to the southeast the province of Utrecht, to the southwest the province of South Holland, and to the west the North Sea.

North Holland is a broad peninsula for the most part, located between the North Sea, the Wadden Sea, the IJsselmeer, and the Markermeer. More than half of the province consists of reclaimed polder land situated below sea level. The West Frisian Islands of Noorderhaaks and Texel are also part of the province. North Holland makes up a single region of the ISO world region code system, having the code ISO 3166-2:NL-NH.

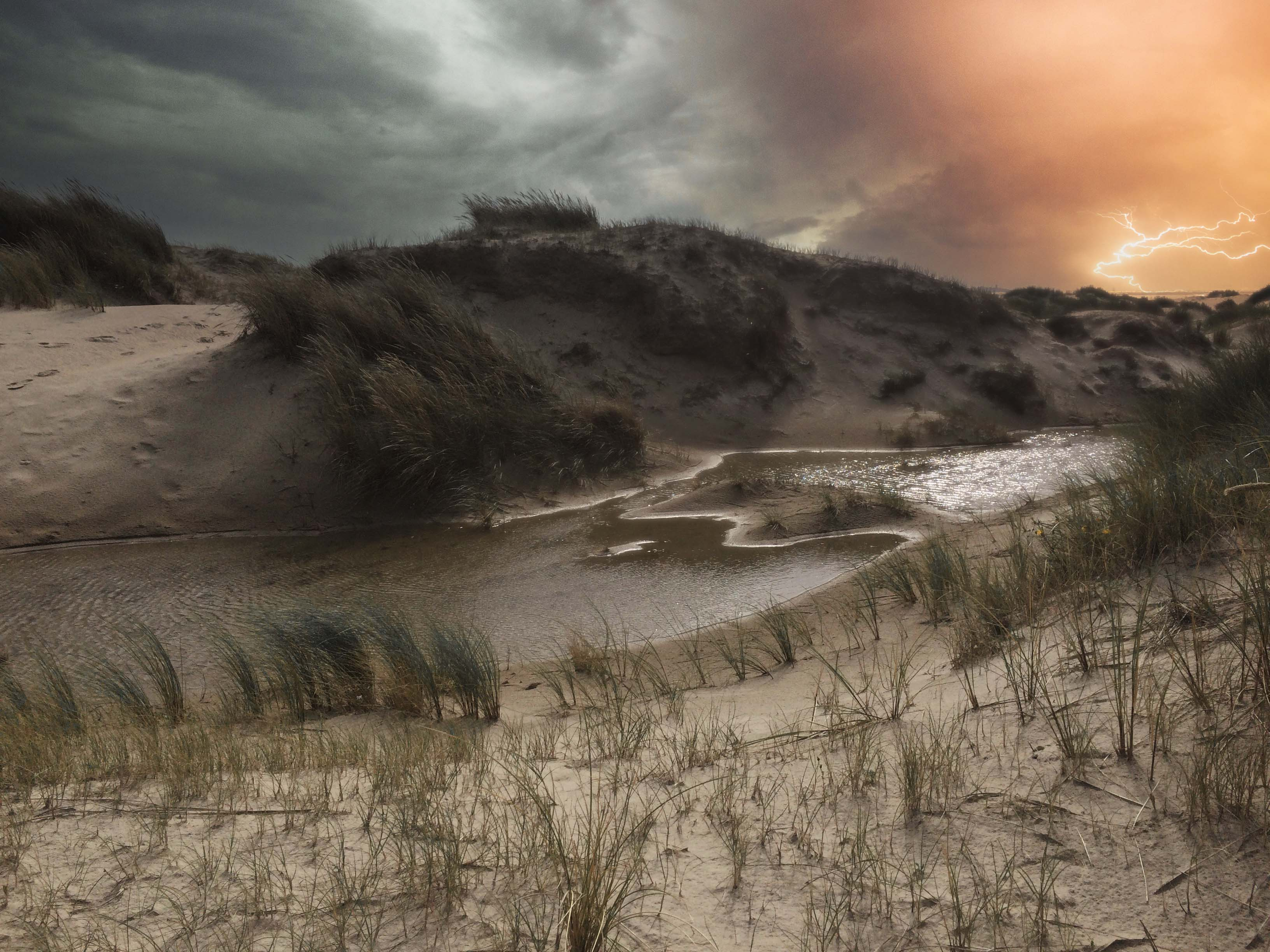
National Park Duinen van Texel

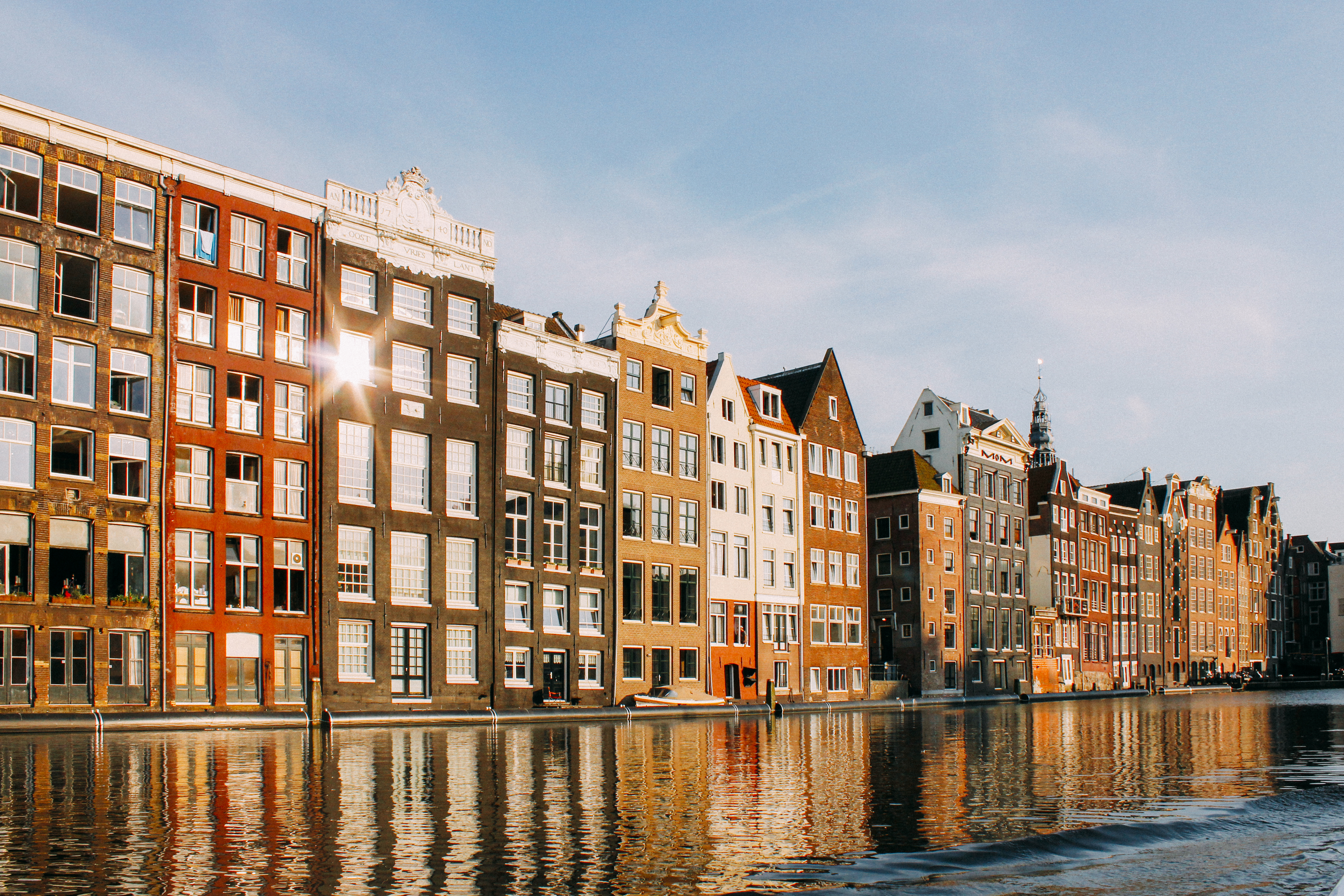
Damrak, Amsterdam

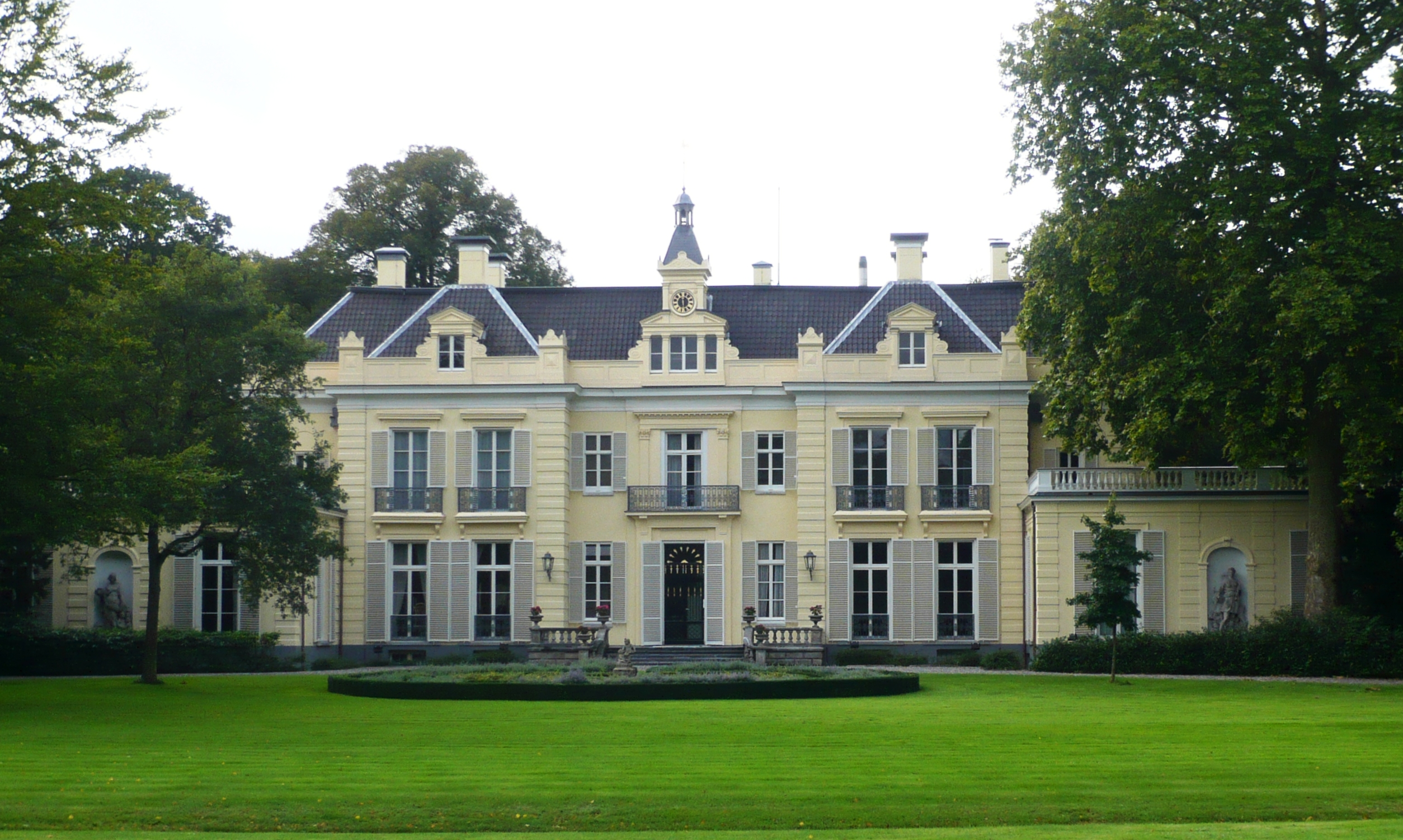
Hartekamp, Heemstede

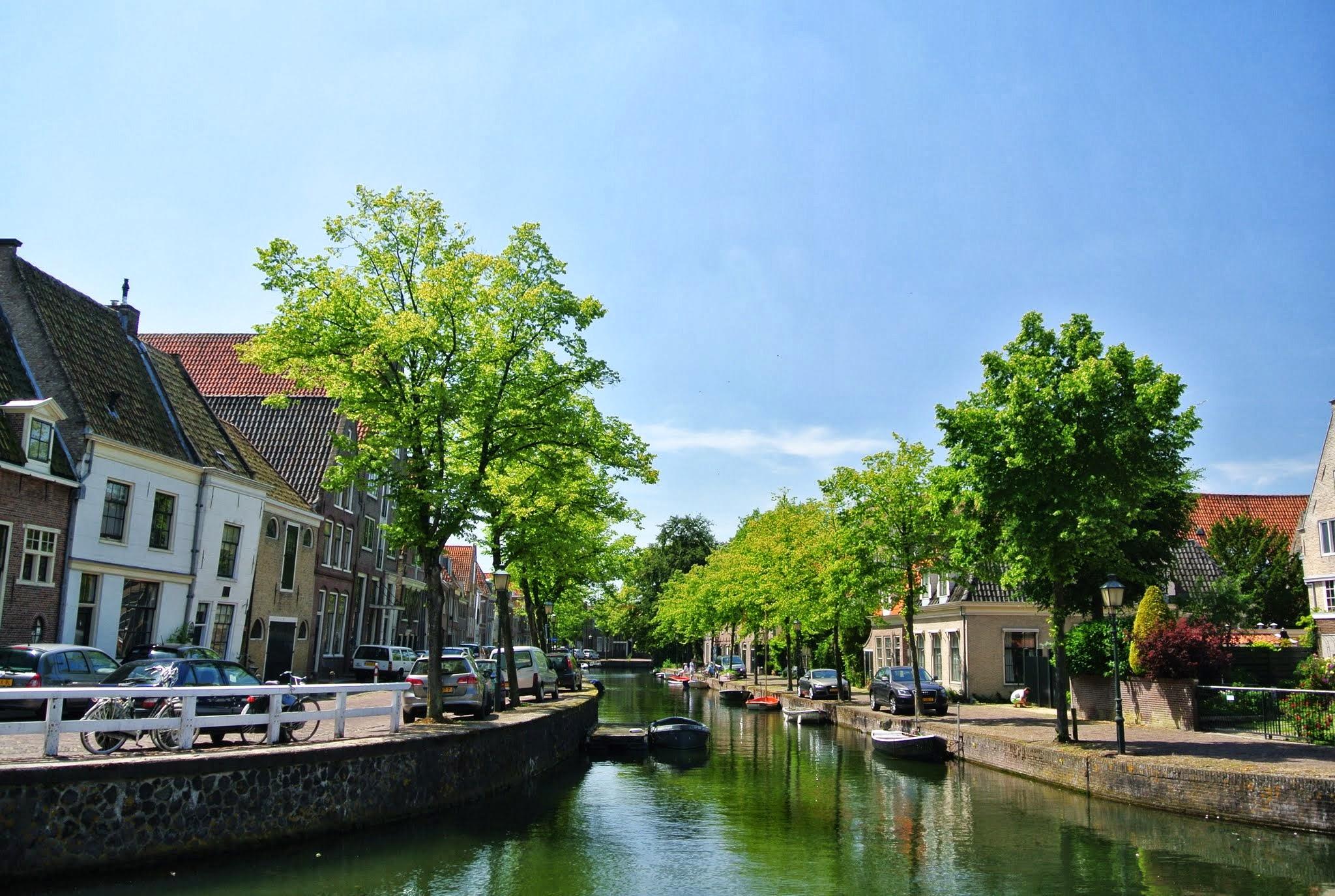
Hoorn

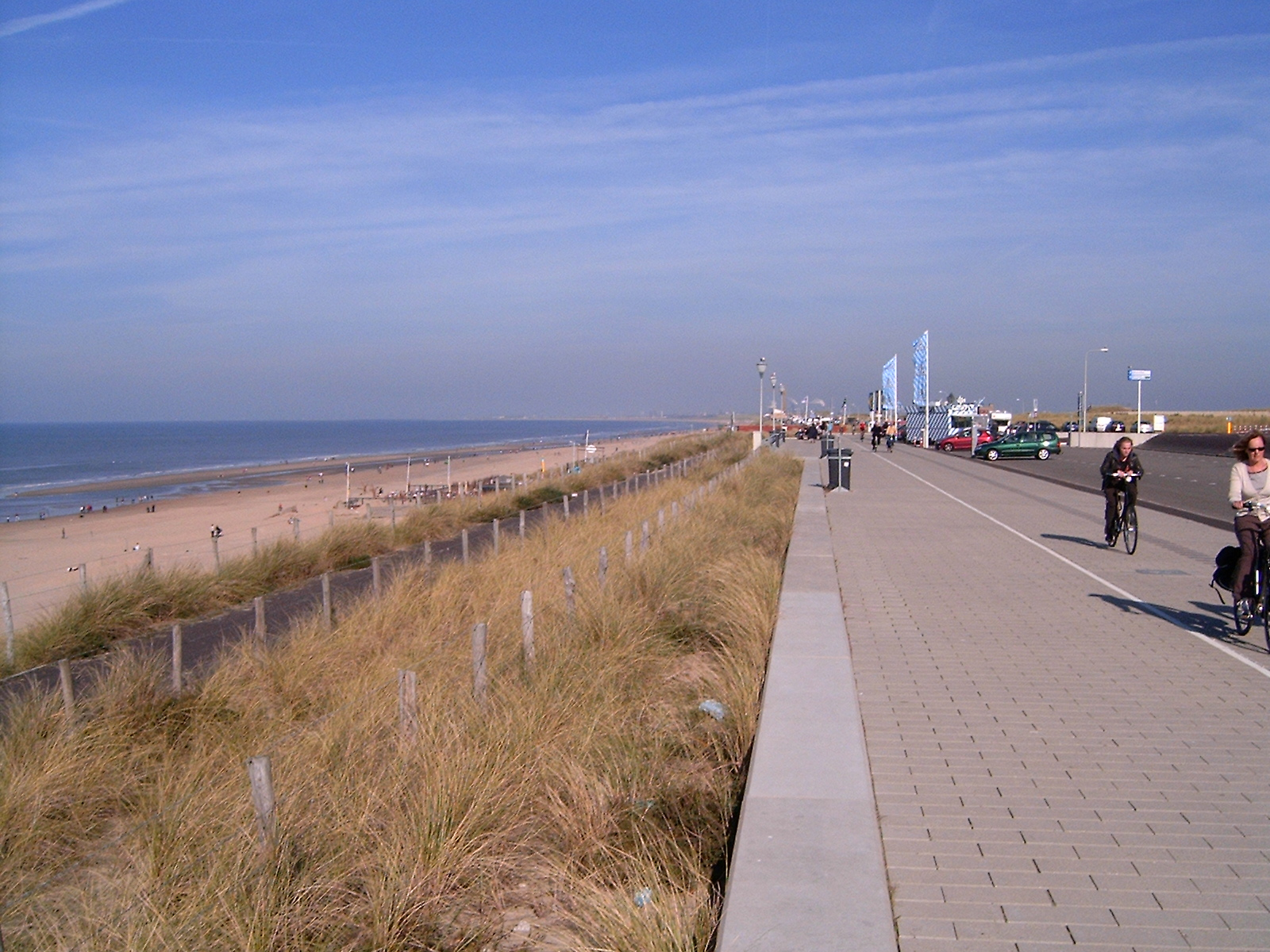
Zandvoort

Government house of North Holland province, Villa Welgelegen, in Haarlem

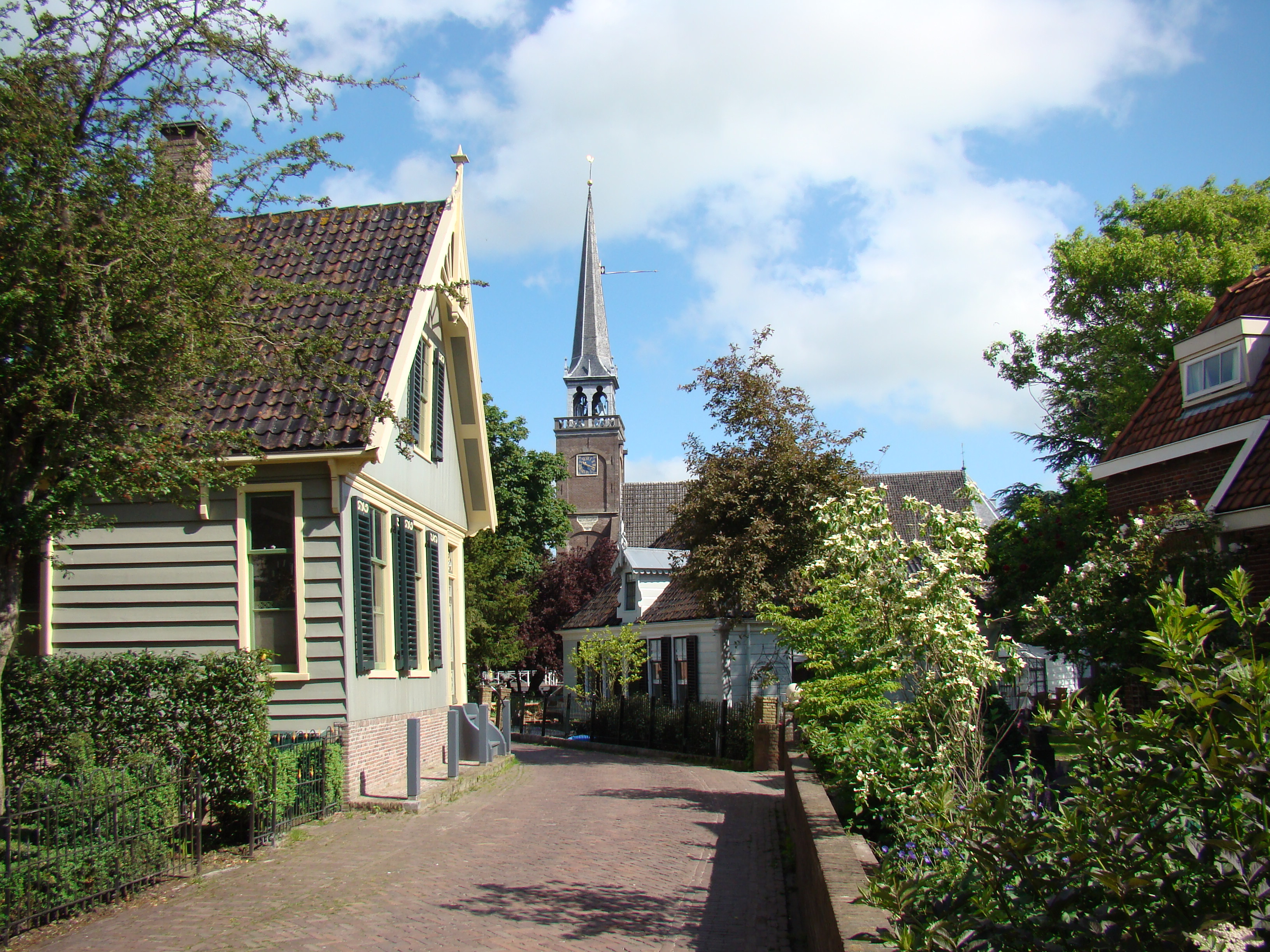
Broek in Waterland

=== Nature ===
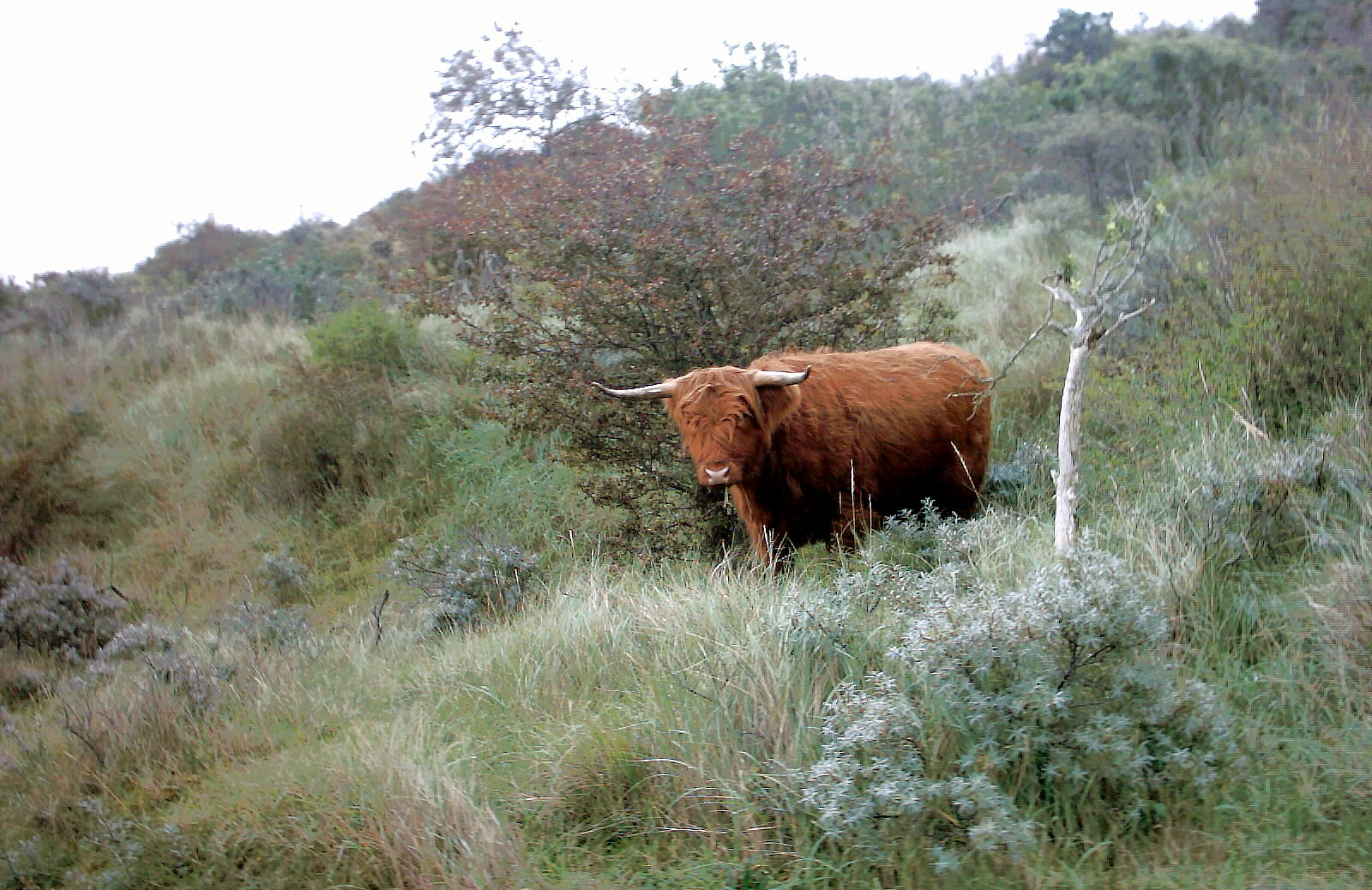
Highland cattle in Zuid-Kennemerland National Park

Some of the best known nature reserves in this province are:

- Wadden Sea
- Zuid-Kennemerland National Park
- Dunes of Texel National Park

More information about nature reserves in North Holland is available (in Dutch) on the relevant site pages of national nature conservation organisations Natuurmonumenten and Staatsbosbeheer , as well as provincial organisation "Landschap Noord-Holland".

=== Regions in North Holland ===
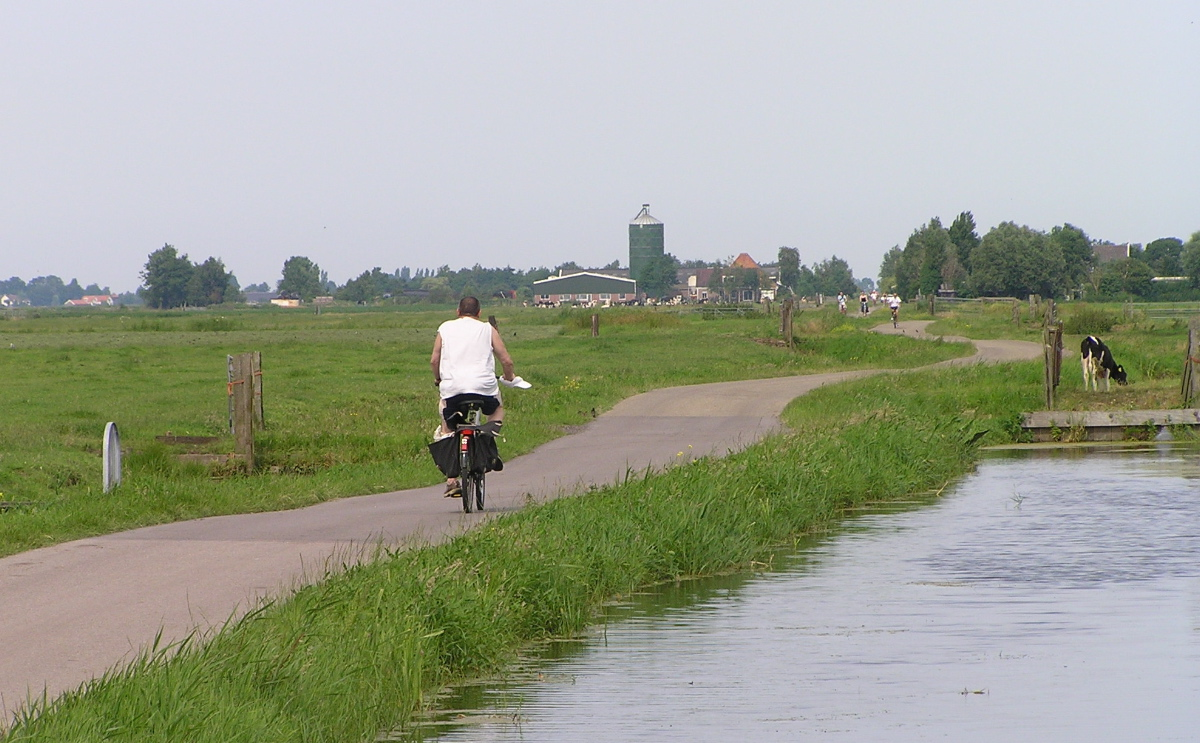
Waterland

North Holland has various regions that, for historical or other reasons, have their own identities. Some of these regions are unofficial, ill-defined and sometimes overlapping. Others are official and are part of regional groupings artificially created for various administrative purposes. These regions are not the same as the municipalities.

List of some of the unofficial and official regions in North Holland:

- Amstelland (the area around the Amstel)
- Beemster
- Bollenstreek (the flower areas found in both North Holland and South Holland)
- The Gooi (in Dutch usually "Het Gooi" or "'t Gooi")
- Groene Hart (North Holland, South Holland and Utrecht)
- Haarlemmermeer
- Holland (North Holland and South Holland)
- IJmond ('The Mouth of the IJ')
- Kennemerland
- Kop van Noord-Holland
- Noorderkwartier ('North Quarter')
- Noordvleugel ('North Wing')
- Purmer
- Randstad (North Holland, South Holland, Utrecht and Flevoland)
- Schermer
- De Streek
- Texel
- Utrecht Hill Ridge (Utrecht and North Holland)
- Vechtstreek ("The Vecht Area"; Utrecht and North Holland)
- Waterland (now effectively the municipality of Waterland, North Holland)
- West-Friesland
- Wieringen
- Wieringermeer
- Wijdewormer (De Wormer)
- Zaanstreek ('The Zaan Area')

== Population and municipalities ==
Historical population
Year	Pop.	±%
1950	1,842,604	—
1960	2,054,509	+11.5%
1970	2,244,456	+9.2%
1980	2,307,646	+2.8%
1990	2,376,015	+3.0%
2000	2,518,354	+6.0%
2010	2,669,084	+6.0%
2020	2,879,527	+7.9%

About one in six Dutch people live in North Holland, which resulted in a population density over eight times the European average as of 2004.

As of 24 March 2022, North Holland is divided into 45 municipalities (local government). After the dissolution of the Netherlands Antilles, three islands in the Caribbean: Bonaire, Saba, and Sint Eustatius, were offered to join the province. However, the offer has been neither accepted nor rejected.

North Holland has five municipalities with 100,000 or more inhabitants. They are, in order of size, Amsterdam (in terms of population this is also the largest municipality in the Netherlands), Haarlem, Zaanstad, Haarlemmermeer, and Alkmaar. Another seven municipalities have a population between 50,000 and 100,000 inhabitants (Hilversum, Amstelveen, Purmerend, Hoorn, Velsen, Den Helder, and Dijk en Waard).

Municipalities are grouped for statistical purposes.

Kop van North Holland COROP group

- Den Helder
- Drechterland
- Enkhuizen
- Hollands Kroon
- Hoorn
- Koggenland
- Medemblik
- Opmeer
- Schagen
- Stede Broec
- Texel

Alkmaar agglomeration COROP group

- Alkmaar
- Bergen
- Dijk en Waard
- Heiloo

IJmond COROP group

- Beverwijk
- Castricum
- Heemskerk
- Uitgeest
- Velsen

Haarlem agglomeration COROP group

- Bloemendaal
- Haarlem
- Heemstede
- Zandvoort

Zaanstreek COROP group

- Wormerland
- Zaanstad

Greater Amsterdam COROP group

- Aalsmeer
- Amstelveen
- Amsterdam
- Diemen
- Edam-Volendam
- Haarlemmermeer
- Landsmeer
- Oostzaan
- Ouder-Amstel
- Purmerend
- Uithoorn
- Waterland

Het Gooi and Vechtstreek COROP group

- Blaricum
- Gooise Meren
- Hilversum
- Huizen
- Laren
- Wijdemeren

== Religion ==
In 2015 official statistics have showed that most inhabitants are religiously unaffiliated; 62.9% are not religious, 16.3% are Roman Catholic, 7.9% are Protestant, 6.6% are Muslim, and 6.2% of other faiths. Almost half of all Dutch Jews live in this province, mainly in and around Amsterdam and Amstelveen which has the highest Jewish population in the Netherlands. Dutch Muslims in North Holland are also concentrated in Amsterdam and some surroundings like Zaanstad. Although Catholicism in the Netherlands is mainly concentrated in the south of the country, there exist several highly Catholic exclaves within North Holland especially in the north of the province such as in Edam-Volendam and Opmeer where more than half are adherents. North Holland has the lowest rate of Protestantism and orthodox Calvinism outside the south of the country, however it does have one strongly Protestant village called Marken.

== Economy ==
Several international organisations such as Amnesty International have settled the head office of their Netherlands branch in the province and particularly in Amsterdam; the international head office of Greenpeace is located in the city. Companies based in the Netherlands' capital include AkzoNobel, Heineken International, ING Group, ABN AMRO, TomTom, Delta Lloyd Group, Booking.com and Philips. Randstad NV is headquartered in Diemen, while KPMG and KLM operate from Amstelveen.

Several national nature-friendly organisations like Milieudefensie, the national "Union of Vegetarians", the "Vissenbescherming" ('Fish Protection Foundation') and the Party for the Animals as well have their head office in North Holland.
