= Thijsse's Hof =

Coordinates: 52.405°N 4.612°E

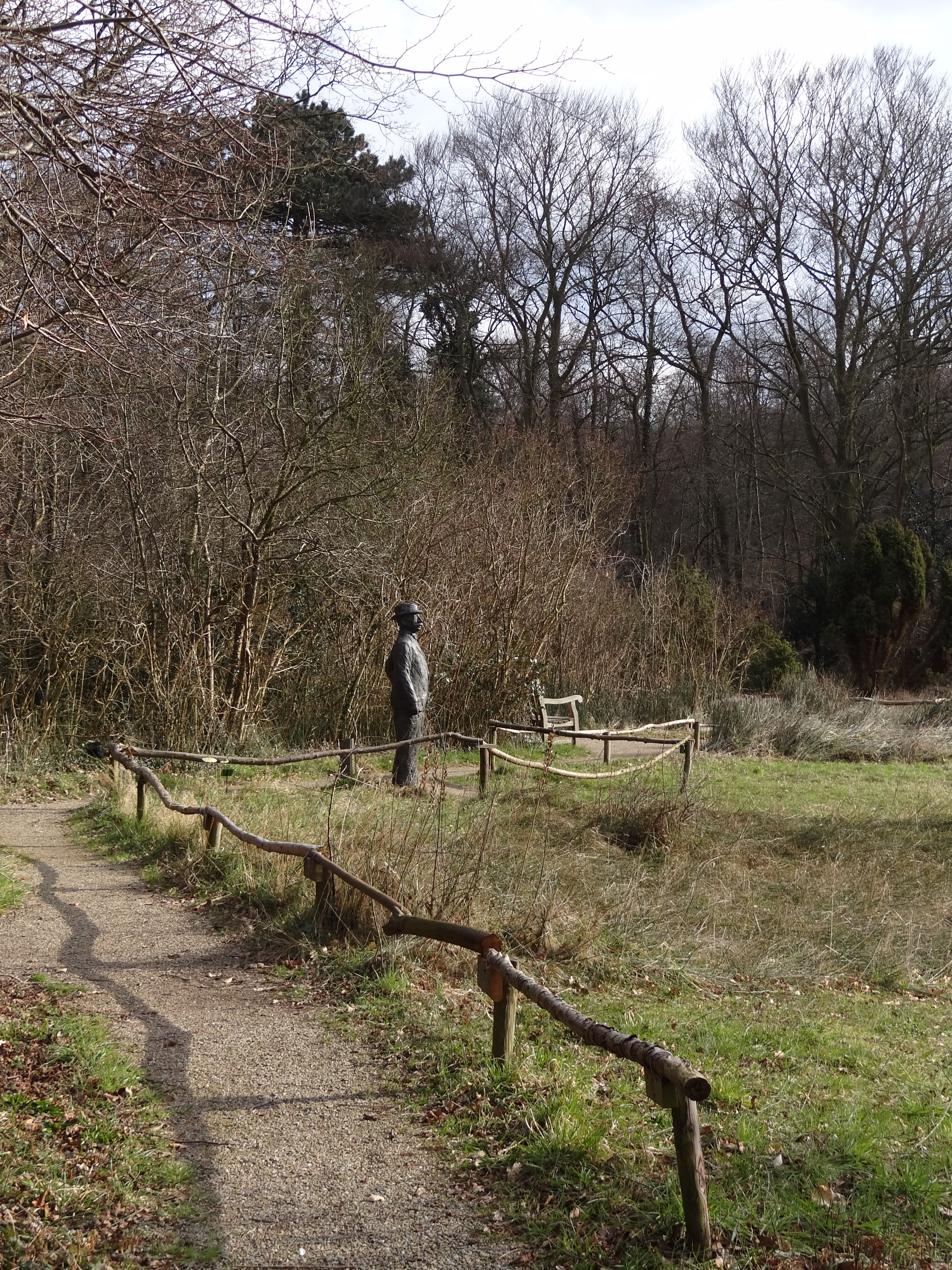
Thijsse's Hof - Bloemendaal (8523695017)

Thijsse's Hof (The garden of Thijsse) is a wildlife garden in Bloemendaal, the Netherlands. It was created in 1925 on the occasion of the 60th birthday of Jac. P. Thijsse, naturalist and nature conservationist. It is the oldest wildlife garden in the Netherlands, and one of the oldest of Europe, and in the world.

In Thijsse's Hof about 800 species of native plants can be found in South Kennemerland, the region in which Bloemendaal is situated. Most of the plants are grown in natural vegetations. The garden is also a home for many birds. Its full name is Thijsse's Hof; planten- en vogeltuin in het Bloemendaalsche Bosch (Garden of Thijsse : garden for plants and birds in the Bloemendaal Wood).

== History ==
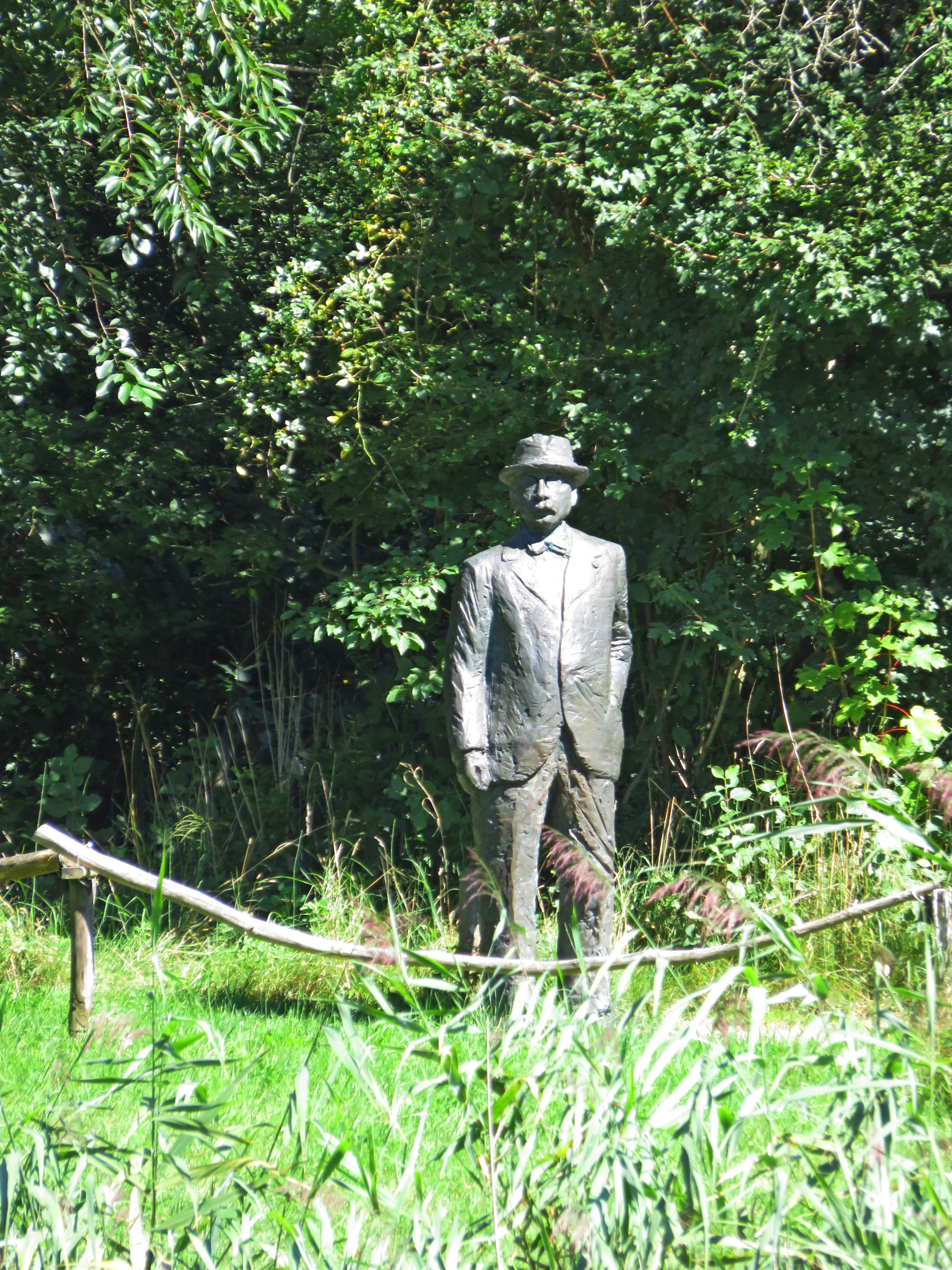
Statue of Jac.P.Thijsse, the founder of the Hof

In 1925 the garden was offered to Jac. P. Thijsse as a present for his 60th birthday. Friends of Thijsse wanted to honor Thijsse by creating a little garden, close to his house, where the plants and animals of the dune area could be displayed in a natural environment. It was known that this was already a long time wish of Thijsse. The garden was designed by the landscape architect Leonard Springer.

In 1920 the Bloemendaal Wood had become the property of the municipality of Bloemendaal. A small terrain in the wood, behind the pancake house on the Mollaan, was oak coppice, where potatoes were grown. This terrain of about 2 ha. was given to a foundation in the making, that would run the new wildlife garden.

Works were started on 2 January 1925. Thijsse himself was involved in the activities to create the garden. The design, created by Springer, is still largely intact. The garden was designed in a way, that in spring the herbs had plenty of light. Later in the year the shrubs start growing, and still later the bigger trees.

Thijsse became the first president of the foundation “Planten- en vogeltuin in het Bloemendaalsche Bosch”. The foundation was founded on 17 July 1925. At 25 July – his birthday – Thijsse received the special key to the special entrance that was created for him, close to his house. The garden was officially opened on 26 September. On that day it rained a lot.

The planting of the garden was done by Kees Sipkes, who ran a nursery for native plants near Haarlem.

Thijsse himself wanted to name the garden after Frederik van Eeden (sr., the botanist). But his friends thought the name “Garden of E(e)den” not really appropriate, so “Thijsse's Hof” was chosen.

Thijsse wrote a lot about his garden in journals and magazines. He wrote two books on Thijsse's Hof:

- * 1940: Een jaar in Thijsse's Hof: lente-zomer-herfst-winter (A year in Thijsse's Hof: spring-summer-autumn-winter). (2nd impression 1940; 3rd impression 1942; 4th: 1943; 5th. 1946). The book was published as part 2 of the Heemschutserie, by Allert de Lange, Amsterdam.
- 1942: Een tweede jaar in Thijsse's Hof. (A second year in Thijsse's Hof). Amsterdam : Allert de Lange.

== Vegetation types ==
The most important vegetation types of the dunes of South Kennemerland are present in Thijsse's Hof.

The dune woodland

In the dune woodland the common oak Quercus robur is dominating. This vegetation type has a lot of other trees and shrubs as well, like European beech Fagus sylvatica, bird cherry Prunus padus, hawthorn, hazel and yew. The floor level of the woodland has many flowering plants. Snowdrop and spring snowflake flowering in winter and early spring. Wood anemone, bird-in-a-bush, primrose, bluebell, leopard's-bane and ramsons flowering in April and May.
The woodland is rich in birds like chaffinch, chiffchaff, blackbird, song thrush and tits.

The dune scrub

The dune scrub is the vegetation type with shrubs dominating. On the calcareous soils of the dunes the spindle tree, hawthorn, sea buckthorn, buckthorn and barberry are growing. When the shrubs have berries in autumn, they attract various birds.

The coppice

The coppice is a low woodland, with trees that are regularly coppiced

The pond

The pond lies in the centre of Thijsse's Hof, and plays an important role, from the point of view of garden architecture, as well as from the point of view of the ecological value. It attracts many bird species and insects, like dragonflies. In the water several plants are growing, like spiked water milfoil, mare's tail and fringed water lily.

The dune slack

The dune slack lies between the pond and the dry dune grassland. The vegetation is dependent on the vicinity of ground water. Southern marsh orchid, meadowsweet and yellow loosestrife are among the plant species that grow here.

The dry dune grassland

Between the dune slack and the dune slack is a gradual transition. The dry grassland is abundantly flowering in May and June with species like field scabious, common knapweed and salad burnet.
