= Bloemendaal =

- Municipality and town
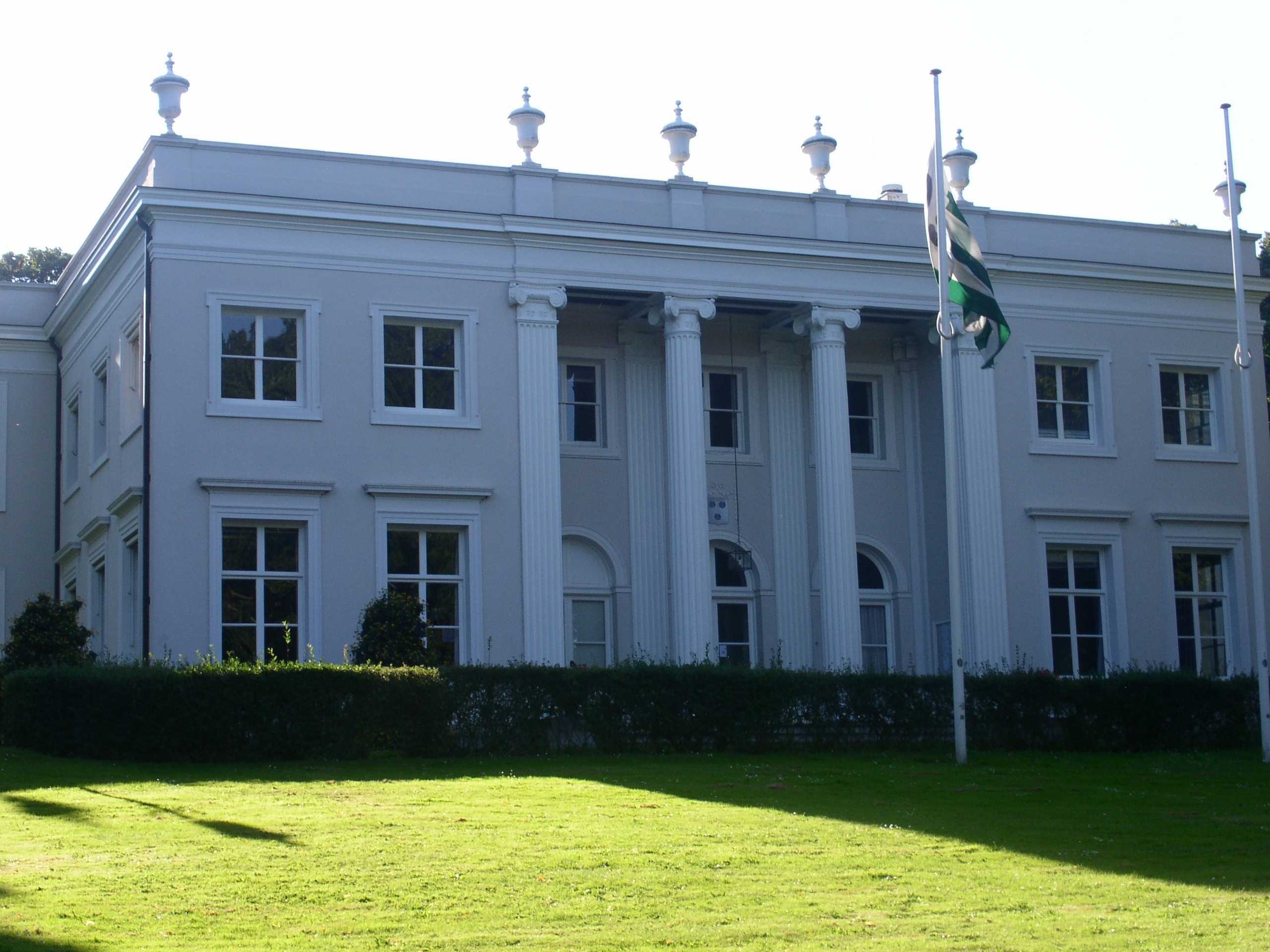
- Bloemendaal Town Hall

- Flag Coat of arms

- Location in North Holland
- Coordinates: 52°24′N 4°36′E
- Country: Netherlands
- Province: North Holland

Government
  - Body: Municipal council
  - Mayor: Michel Rog (New Social Contract)

Area
  - Total: 45.23 km^{2} (17.46 sq mi)
  - Land: 39.79 km^{2} (15.36 sq mi)
  - Water: 5.44 km^{2} (2.10 sq mi)
- Elevation: 12 m (39 ft)

Population (January 2021)
  - Total: 23,478
  - Density: 590/km^{2} (1,500/sq mi)
- Demonym: Bloemendaler
- Time zone: UTC+1 (CET)
  - Summer (DST): UTC+2 (CEST)
- Postcode: 2050–2061, 2110–2121
- Area code: 023
- Website: www.bloemendaal.nl

Bloemendaal (pronounced [ˈblumə(n)ˌdaːl]) is a municipality and town in the Western Netherlands, in the province of North Holland. Bloemendaal is, together with Wassenaar, the wealthiest place in the Netherlands. It is located just west of Haarlem, on the North Sea.

In October 2015, after persistent problems with the local governance in Bloemendaal, the King's Commissioner of North Holland, Johan Remkes, threatened to disband the municipality if the problems were not resolved within a year. Bernt Schneiders, the mayor of Haarlem, was appointed acting mayor of Bloemendaal.

== Population centres ==
The municipality of Bloemendaal consists of the following cities, towns, villages and/or districts:

- Bennebroek
- Bloemendaal
- Aerdenhout
- Bloemendaal aan Zee
- Overveen
- Vogelenzang
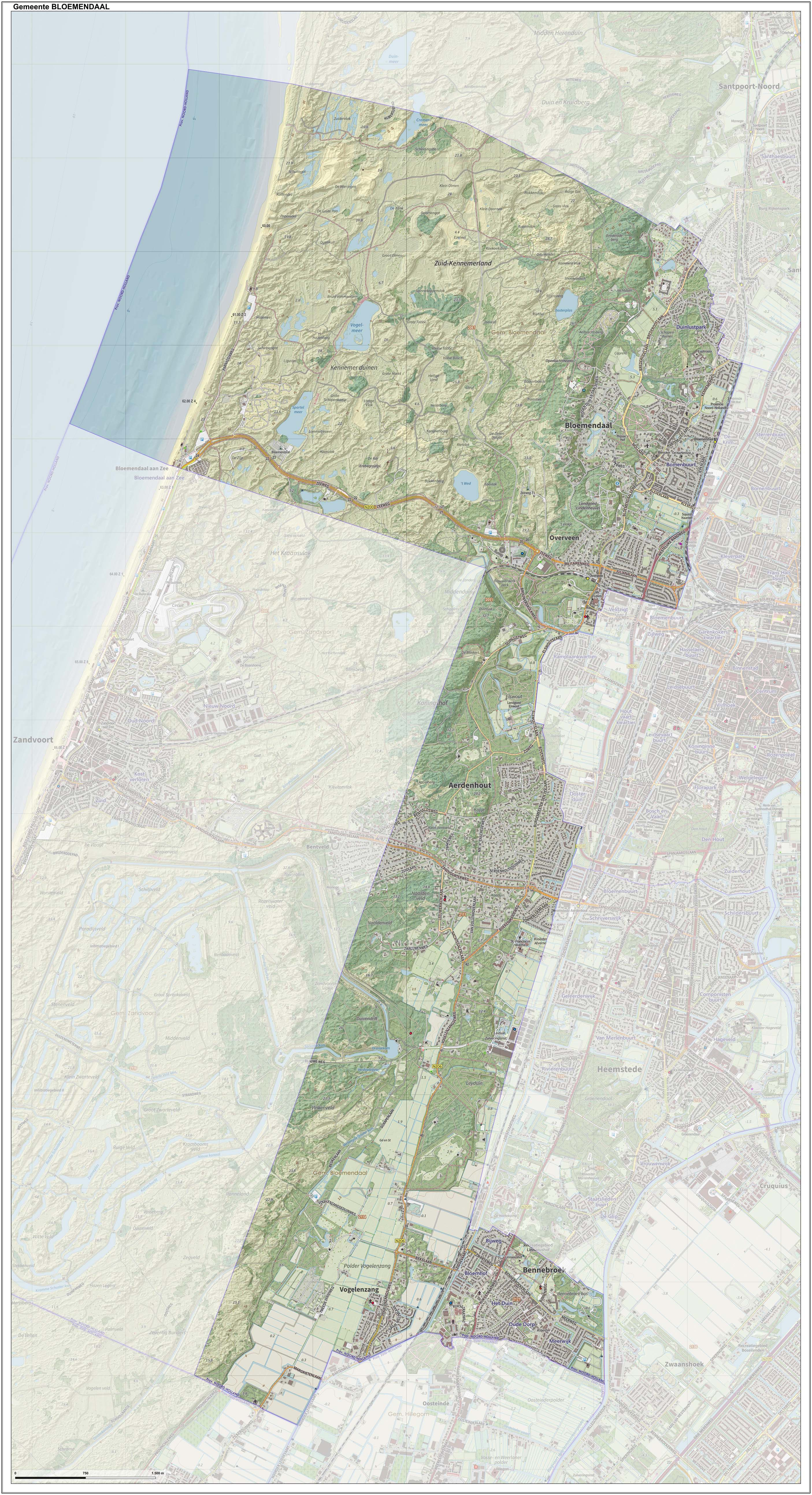
Municipality map, February 2024

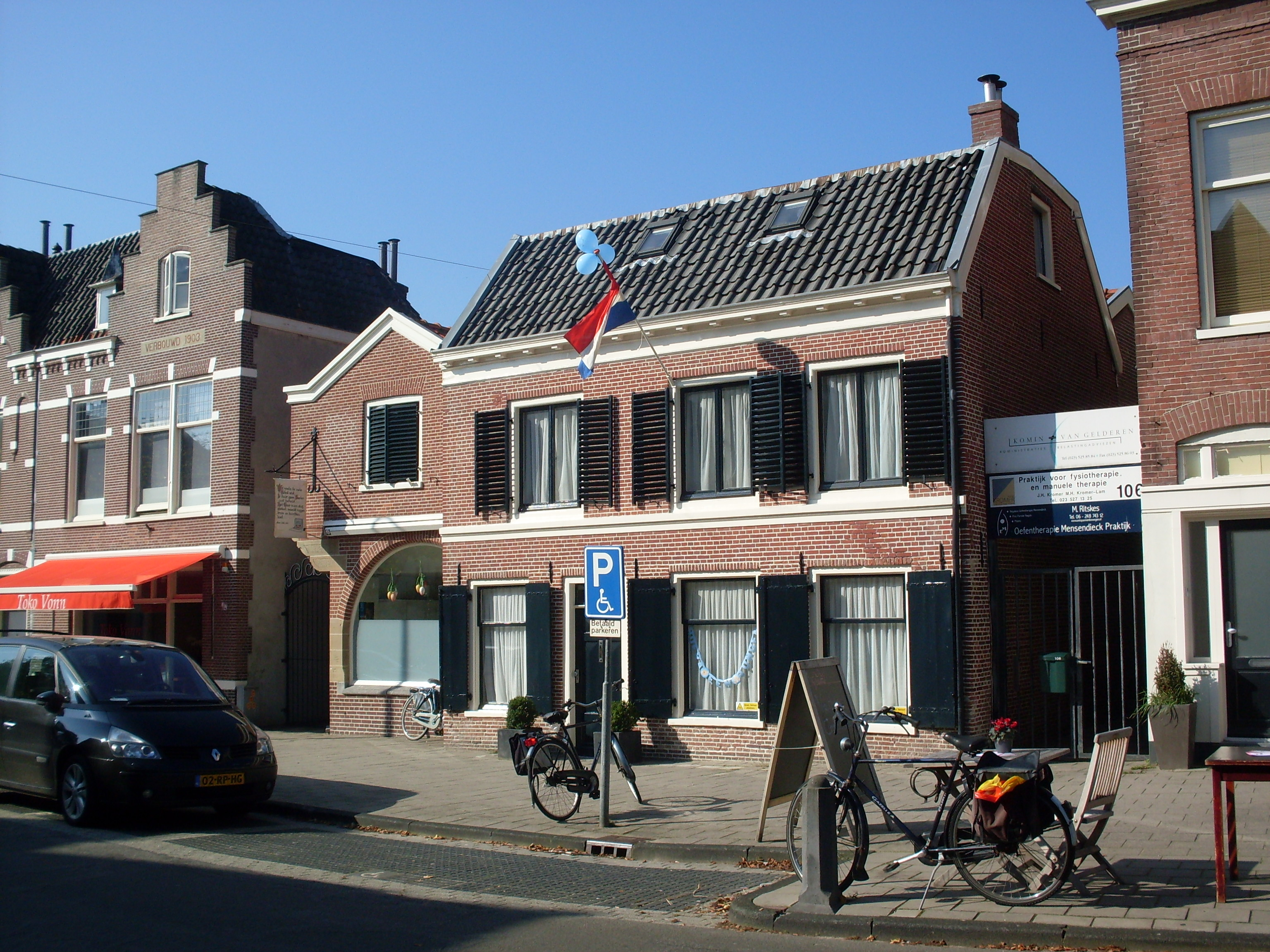
Bloemendaal

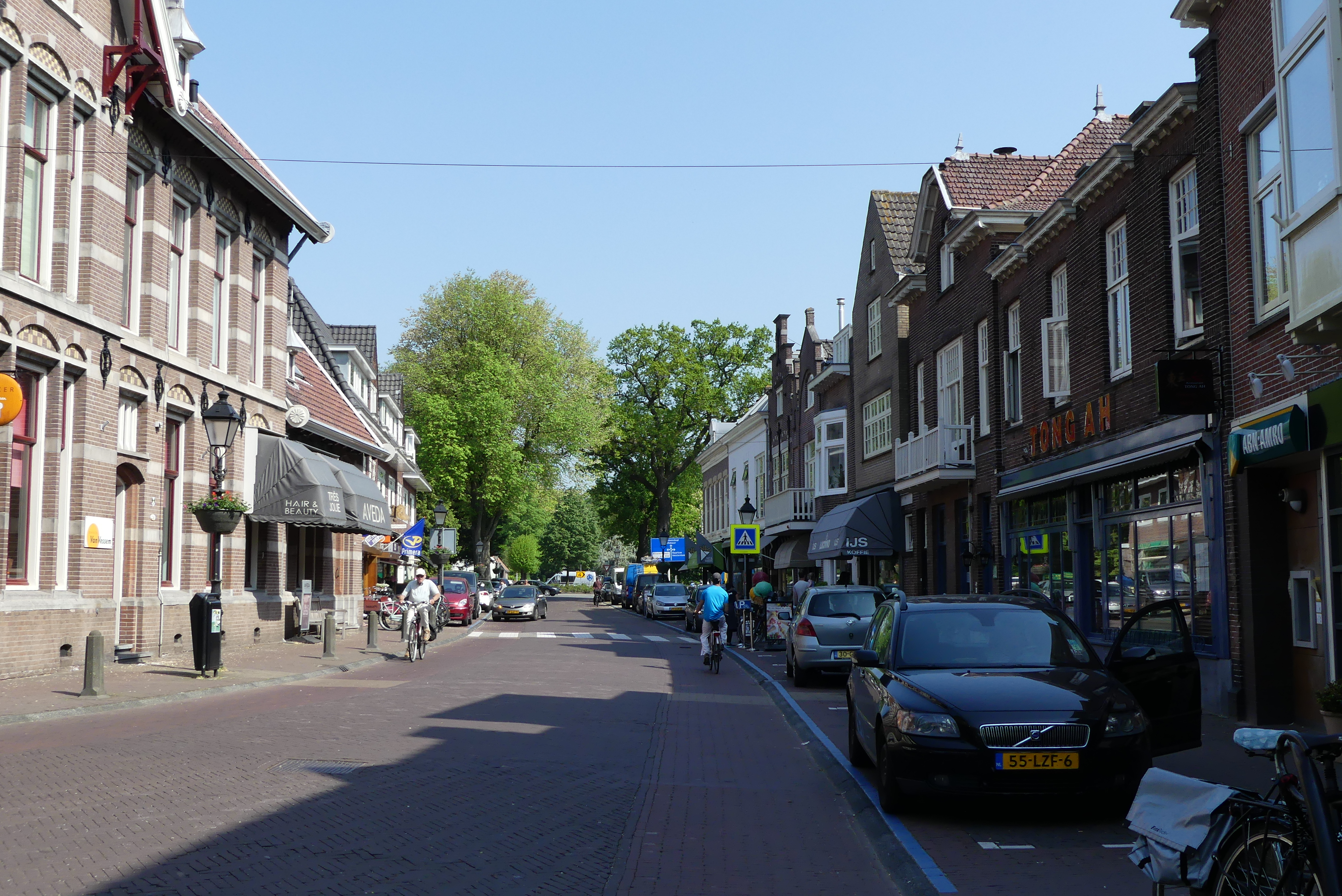
Overveen

== Local government ==
The municipal council of Bloemendaal consists of 19 seats, which after 2026 were divided as follows:

- VVD – 4 seats
- D66 – 4 seats
- GroenLinks / PVDA – 4 seats
- Hart van Bloemendaal – 3 seats
- CDA – 2 seats
- Independent Bloemendaal – 1 seat
- Liberaal Bloemendaal – 1 seat

Since January 2009 Bennebroek, until then a separate municipality, became a part of Bloemendaal.

== Railway connections ==
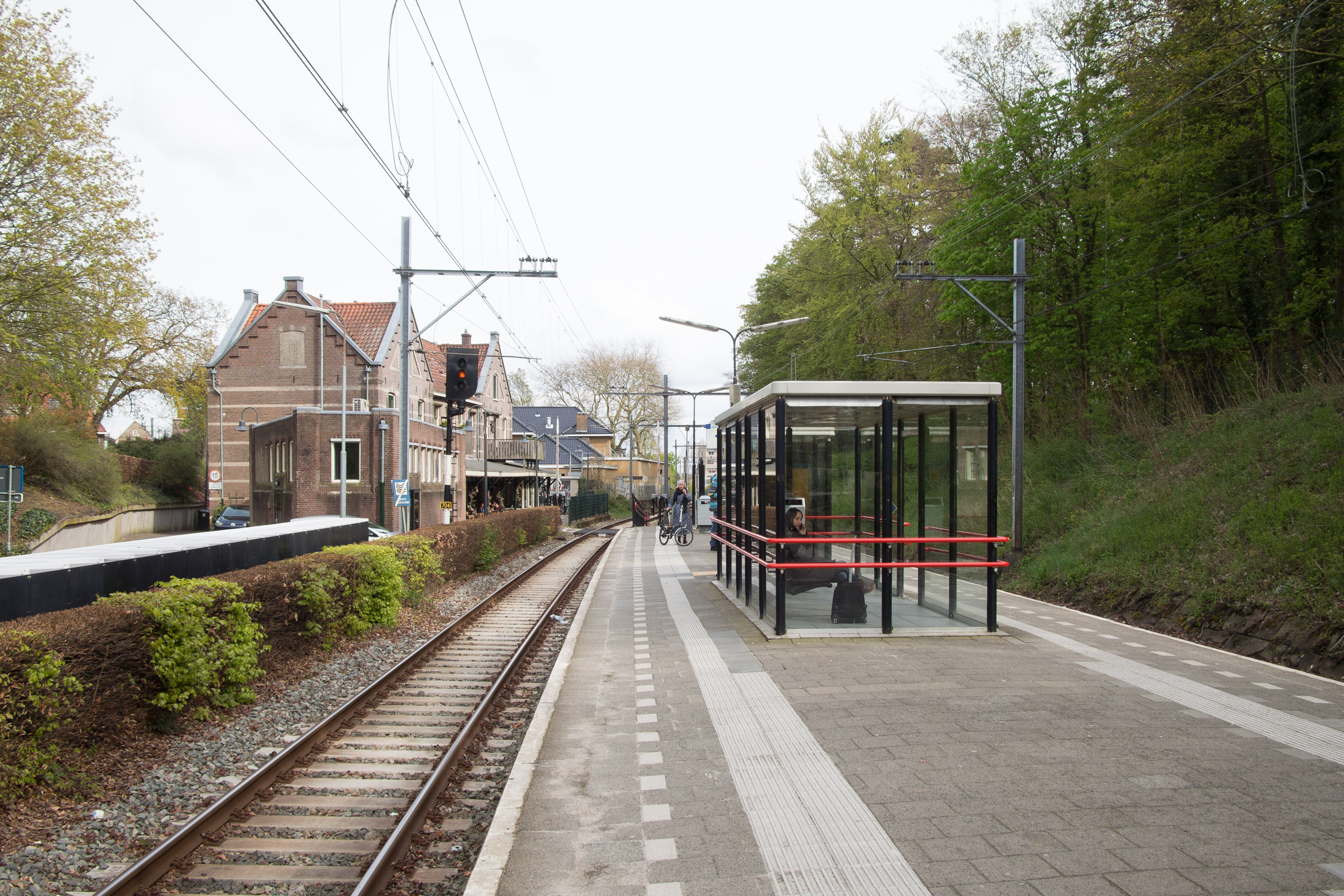
Station Overveen

The municipality has two railway stations: Bloemendaal (on the municipal border with Haarlem) and Overveen. Both are served by Nederlandse Spoorwegen (NS) regional services (Sprinter).

== Sports ==
Bloemendaal is home to one of the country's leading field hockey clubs, HC Bloemendaal. The men's first team competes for the Dutch Hoofdklasse (top league) title most years.

== Thijsse's Hof ==
In 1925 Thijsse's Hof (the Garden of Thijsse) was created. It was the first wildlife garden in the Netherlands. It was given to Jac. P. Thijsse at the occasion of his 60th birthday. The garden still exists today.

== National heritage sites ==
The town of Bloemendaal has 125 listings in the register of rijksmonuments.

== Notable people ==
- Bertha Frensel Wegener (1874 in Bloemendaal – 1953) composer and music educator
- Frederick Koolhoven (1886 in Bloemendaal – 1946) aircraft designer in Britain and Netherlands
- Leo Brongersma (1907 in Bloemendaal – 1994) zoologist, herpetologist, author, and lecturer
- Johan Benders (1907 in Bloemendaal – 1943) teacher and victim of the Gestapo
- Hendrik Van Riessen (1911 in Bloemendaal – 2000 in Bloemendaal) second generation reformational philosopher
- Frank de Miranda (1913 in Bloemendaal – 1986) sculptor, psychologist and publicist
- Tjitze Baarda (1932 in Vogelenzang – 2017) emeritus professor of theology and religious sciences
- Erwin Nypels (born 1933 in Bloemendaal – 2024) politician
- Louwrien Wijers (born 1941 in Aerdenhout) artist and writer
- Ankie Broekers-Knol (born 1946) politician, municipal councillor
- Frank Gerard Rozendaal (1957 in Bloemendaal – 2013) ornithologist, researched the Southeast Asian avifauna

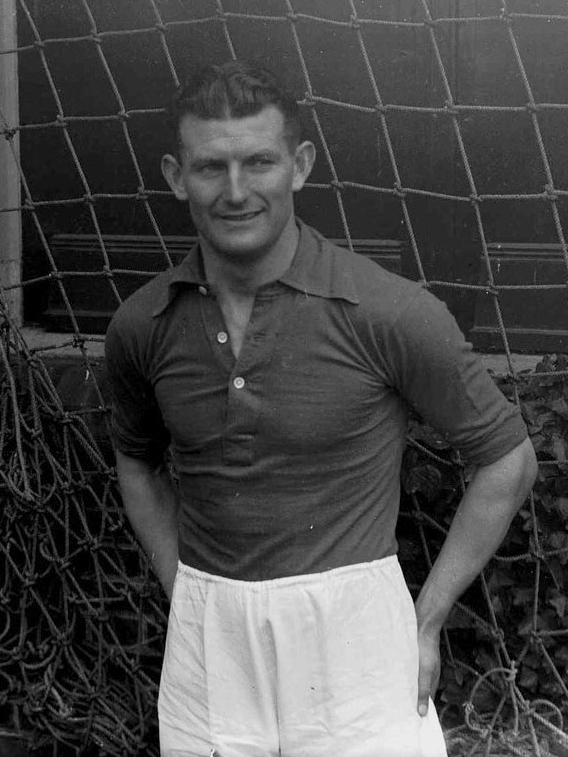
Kick Smit, 1946

=== Sport ===
- Cornelis van der Vliet (1880 in Bloemendaal – 1960 in Bloemendaal) sports shooter, competed in the team clay pigeon event at the 1920 Summer Olympics
- Kick Smit (1911 in Bloemendaal – 1974) football player, 29 caps and 26 goals for the Netherlands national football team
- Aat de Roos (1919 in Bloemendaal – 1992) field hockey player, competed in the 1936 Summer Olympics
- Gijs van Lennep (born 1942 in Aerdenhout) esquire and former racing driver
- Robert van Werkhoven (born 1954 in Bloemendaal) sailor, competed at 1976 Summer Olympics
- Gert Jan Schlatmann (born 1963 in Bloemendaal) former field hockey player
- Ellen Hoog (born 1986 in Bloemendaal) field hockey player

== Gallery ==
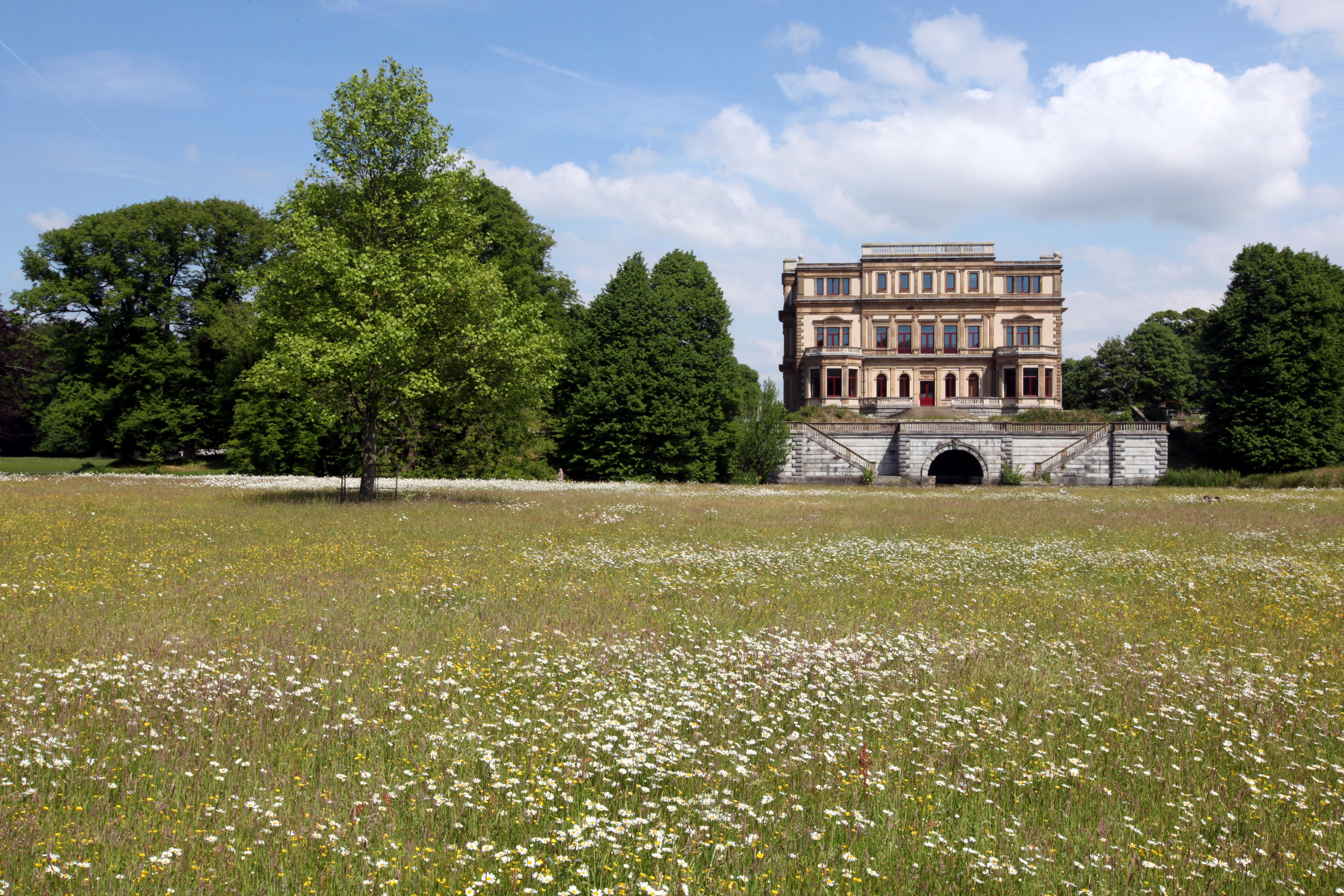
Elswout, Overveen

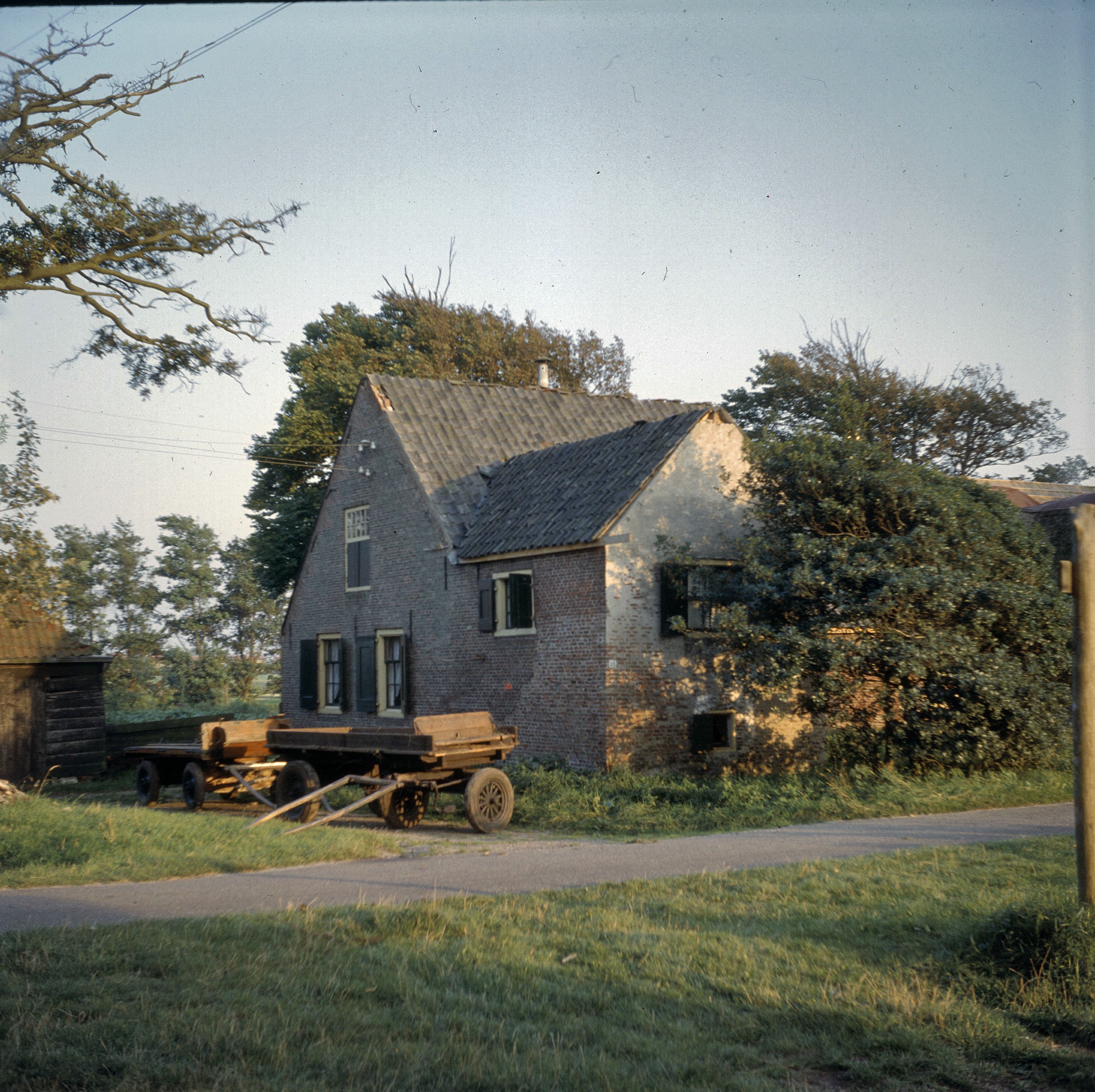
Farmhouse in Vogelenzang

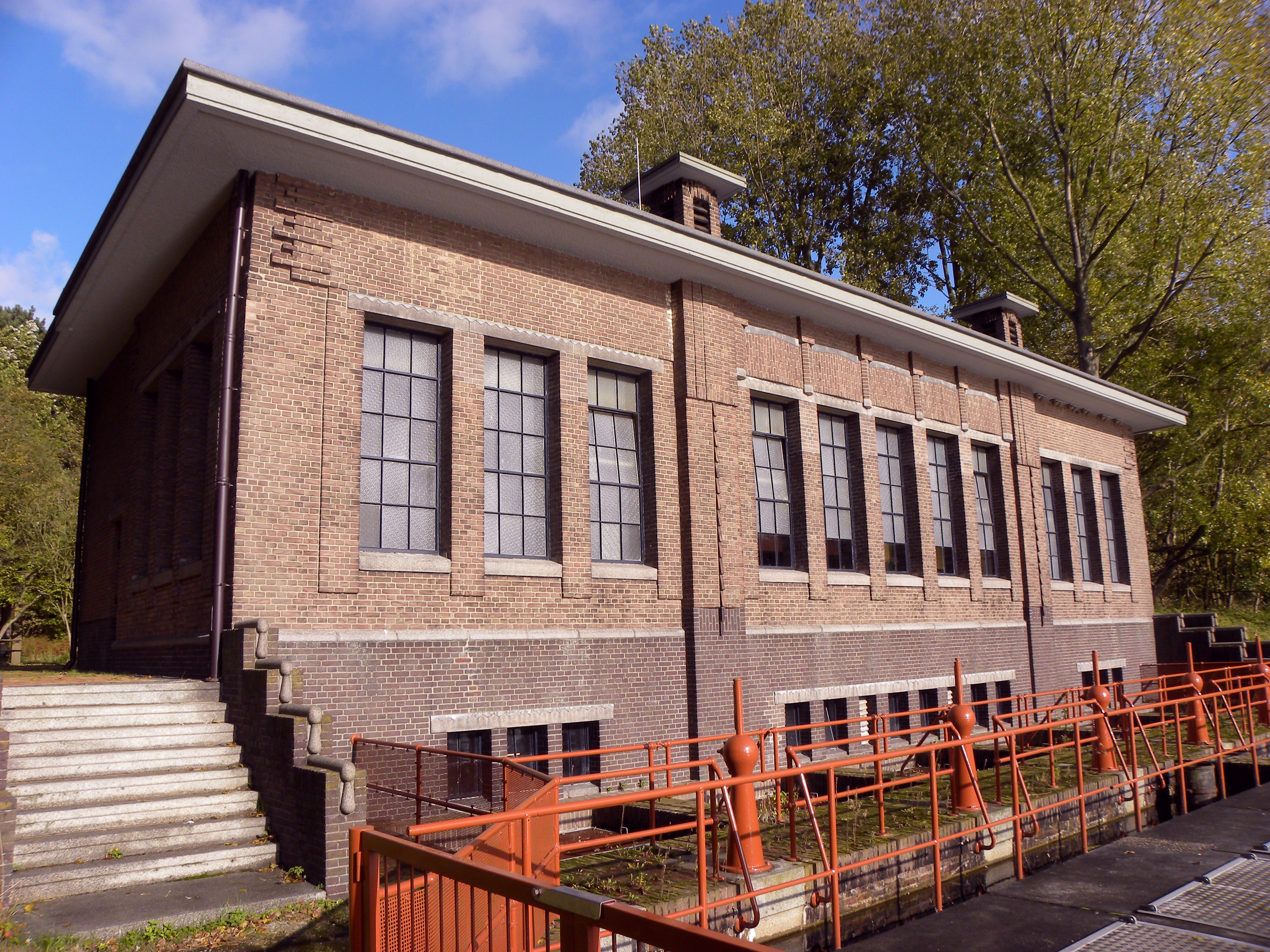
Pumping station in Oranjekom

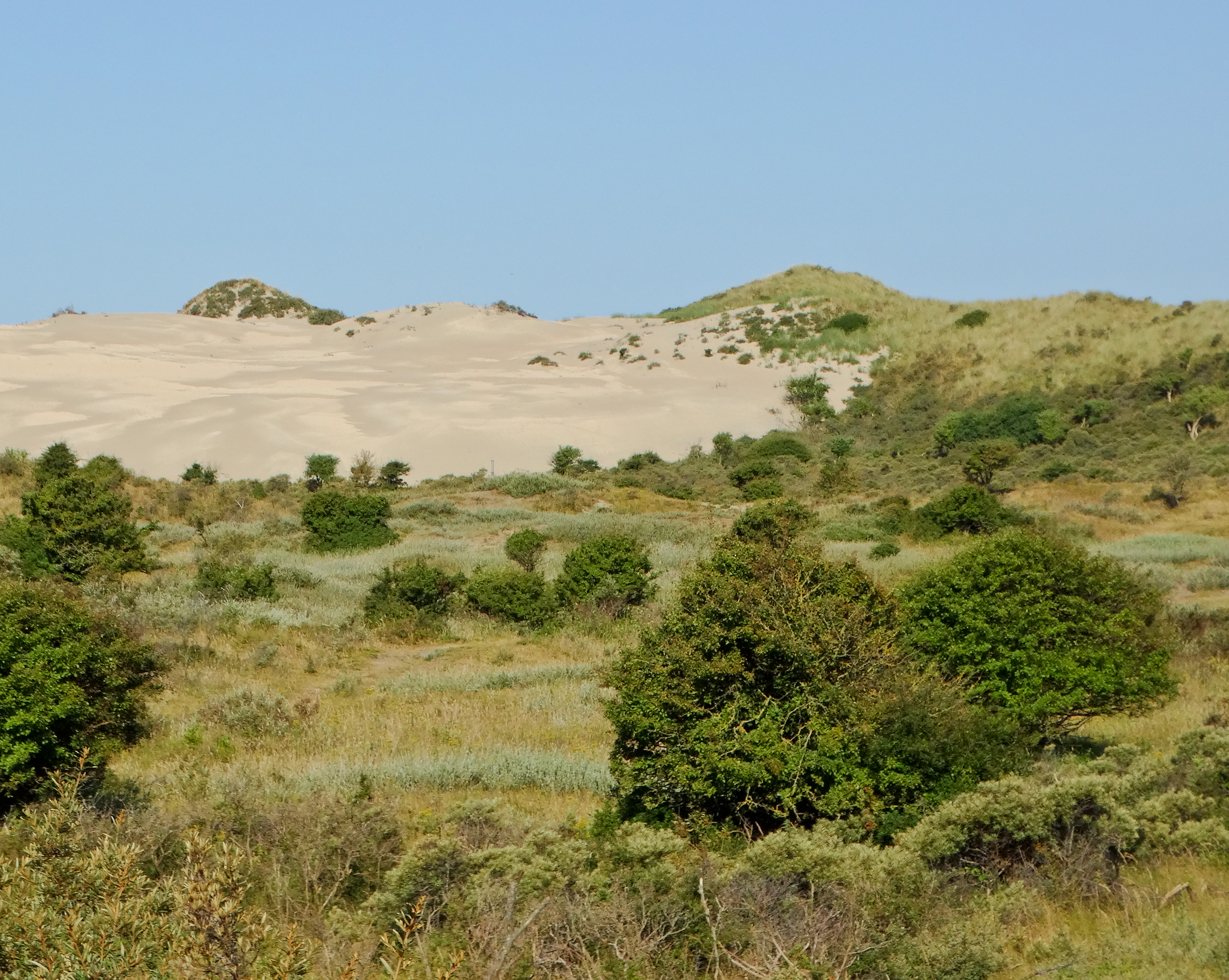
Zuid-Kennemerland National Park

== See also ==
- Erebegraafplaats Bloemendaal
