= Eli Heimans =

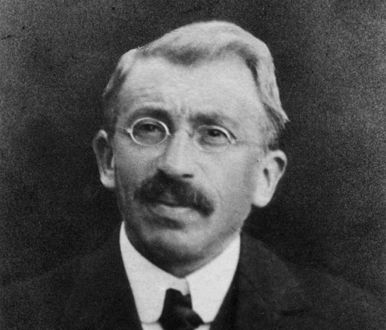

Eli Heimans (28 February 1861 – 22 July 1914) was a Dutch nature educator and conservationist. Along with Jacobus Thijsse he popularized outdoors nature education through his writings.

Heimans was born in Zwolle to a Jewish family of textile dying businessman Jacob Israel Heimans and Elisabeth Valk. He went to the local schools and trained as a mathematics teacher . In 1882 he began to teach in Amsterdam and here he met Jan Ligthart. Around this time he discovered the role of nature in education. In 1883 he went to the Plancius school and along with Ligthart and C.F.A. Zernike he started a pedagogical magazine. He also wrote a booklet on teaching nature in primary schools in 1893. Along with Jacobus Thijsse he began to write more on nature and they founded the magazine De Levende Natuur in 1896. In 1899 they produced an illustrated flora of the Netherlands. In 1901 he helped found the Dutch Natural History Association which later became the Royal Dutch Natural History Society. He was not admitted into the board of Natuurmonumenten in 1905 because of being Jewish.

In 1889 he wrote a popular book for schoolboys called Willem Roda which although fictional included explorations in geology. In 1913 he wrote a book on geology.

Heimans married Betje Stibbe and they had two children. He died suddenly from a heart attack while on a geological expedition.
