= Jacobus P. Thijsse =

Dutch conservationist

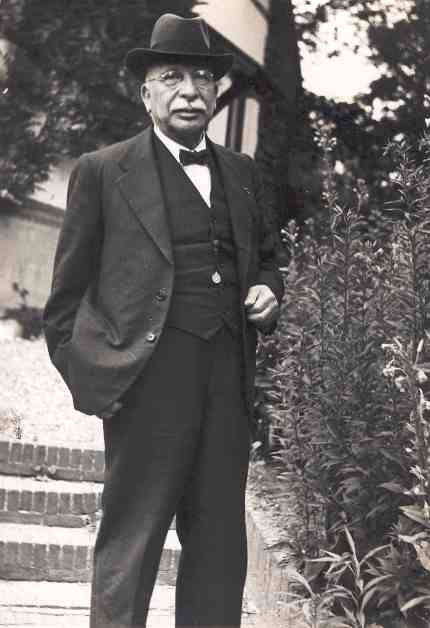
Jac. P. Thijsse

Jacobus Pieter Thijsse (25 July 1865 – 8 January 1945) was a Dutch conservationist and botanist. He founded the Society for Preservation of Nature Monuments in the Netherlands. Along with Eli Heimans and Johannes Bernink, he was active in a period of revival of biological education known as biologisch reveil.

== Biography ==
Thijsse was the son of infantry sergeant Jacobus Thijsse and Catharina Johanna Priester. He grew up in Maastricht, Grave and Woerden. In 1877 the father retired from the army and the family moved to Wagenaarstraat in Amsterdam where Thijsse went to the Municipal School. Here he was taught by Coenraad Kerbert who took him on walks in the parks. In 1883 he qualified as a teacher of modern languages and taught in primary schools in Amsterdam. In 1890 he headed the French School in Den Burg on Texel. Here he started studying the plants, birds, and insects. Thijsse married Helena Christina Petronella Bosch in 1891 and they had two sons. In 1892 he met Eli Heimans and they began to work together. In 1901 he became a natural history teacher at the Kweekschool but he suffered from lung infection. In 1902 he moved to Bloemendaal.

In 1896, along with Heimans and J. Jaspers, he started a magazine called the living nature which became very popular and had 1000 subscribers in a short time. Some of them included Johannes Bernardus Bernink, G. J. Meinen, J. Ceton and others. In 1901 he was a cofounder of the (later Royal) Dutch Natural History Association.

In 1925, on the occasion of his 60th birthday he was honored by his friends with the gift of Thijsse's Hof (Thijsse's Garden), a wildlife garden in Bloemendaal near Haarlem. This was the first wildlife garden in the Netherlands, and one of the oldest worldwide.

In the late 1920s and 1930s, the Verkade company hired Jac. P. Thijsse to write a series of collector albums on flora of the Netherlands. The albums were illustrated by picture cards which could be collected with the purchase of Verkade products. These albums were very popular among the Dutch population before World War II.

The "Jac. P. Thijssepark" in Amstelveen, another wildlife garden, was named after him. He was placed 87th on De Grootste Nederlander (The Greatest Dutchman) list in 2004.
