= NS Intercity Materieel =

Electric multiple unit

NS InterCity Materieel
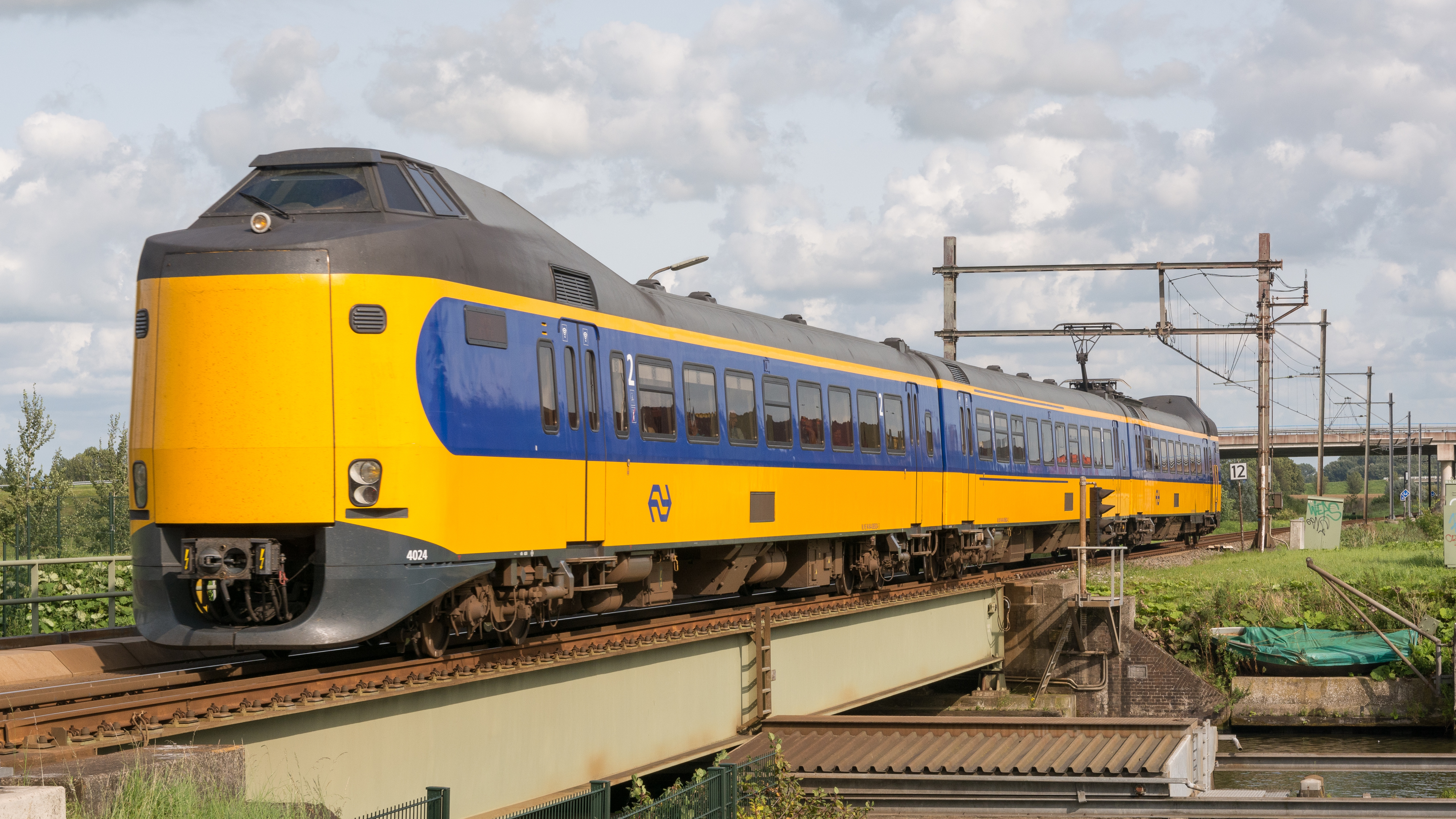
- A refurbished set approaching Alphen aan den Rijn

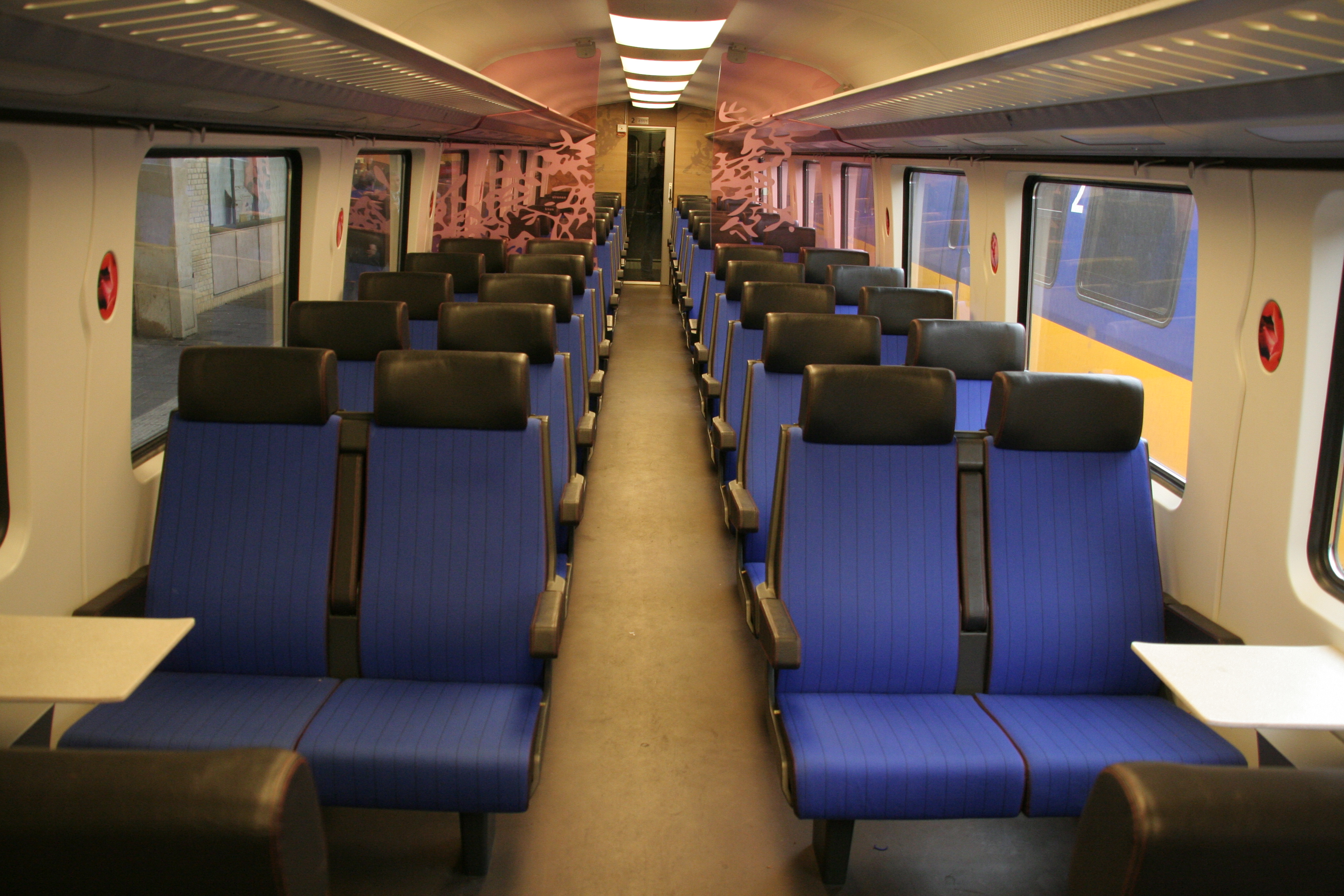
- Refurbished second class interior
- Stock type: Electric multiple unit
- In service: 1977 - 2003 (ICM-0); 1983 - 2024 (ICM-1); 1983 - 2026 (ICM-2); 1990 - 2029 (ICM-3/4)
- Manufacturer: Talbot
- Refurbished: 2005 - 2011
- Number built: 144
- Number preserved: 1 (ICM-1 4011)
- Predecessor: NS Mat '54
- Successor: NS ICNG
- Formation: ICM-0/1/2: 3 cars ICM-3/4 4 cars
- Fleet numbers: ICM-0: 4001 - 4007; ICM-1: 4011 - 4050; ICM-2: 4051 - 4097; ICM-3: 4201 - 4230; ICM-4: 4231 - 4250
- Capacity: ICM-0: 35 (1st), 155 (2nd), 15 (Folding seats); ICM(m)-1: 35 (1st), 163 (2nd), 27 (Folding seats); ICM(m)-2: 35 (1st), 163 (2nd), 28 (Folding seats); ICM(m)-3: 59 (1st), 211 (2nd), 30 (Folding seats); ICM(m)-4: 59 (1st), 211 (2nd), 31 (Folding seats)
- Operator: NS Reizigers

Specifications
- Maximum speed: In service: 140 km/h (87 mph); Design: 160 km/h (100 mph)
- Traction system: 0/1: Resistors; 2/3/4: Holec thyristor chopper
- Power output: 4000: 1,248 kW (1,674 hp); 4200: 1,872 kW (2,510 hp)
- Electric system: 1.5 kV DC Catenary
- Coupling system: Scharfenberg coupler
- Track gauge: 1,435 mm (4 ft 8 1/2 in) standard gauge

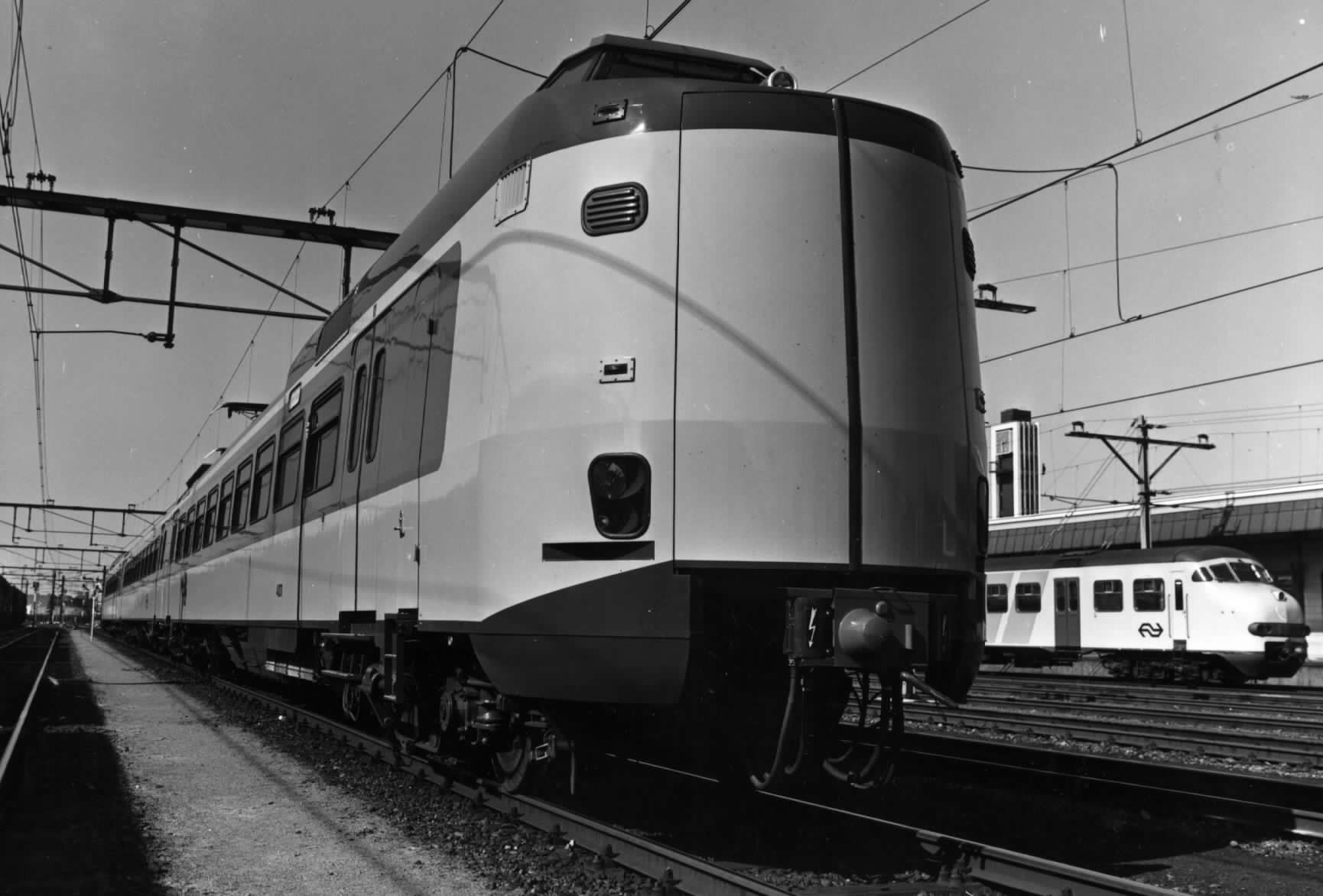
4001 at Venlo in April 1977 on a trial run

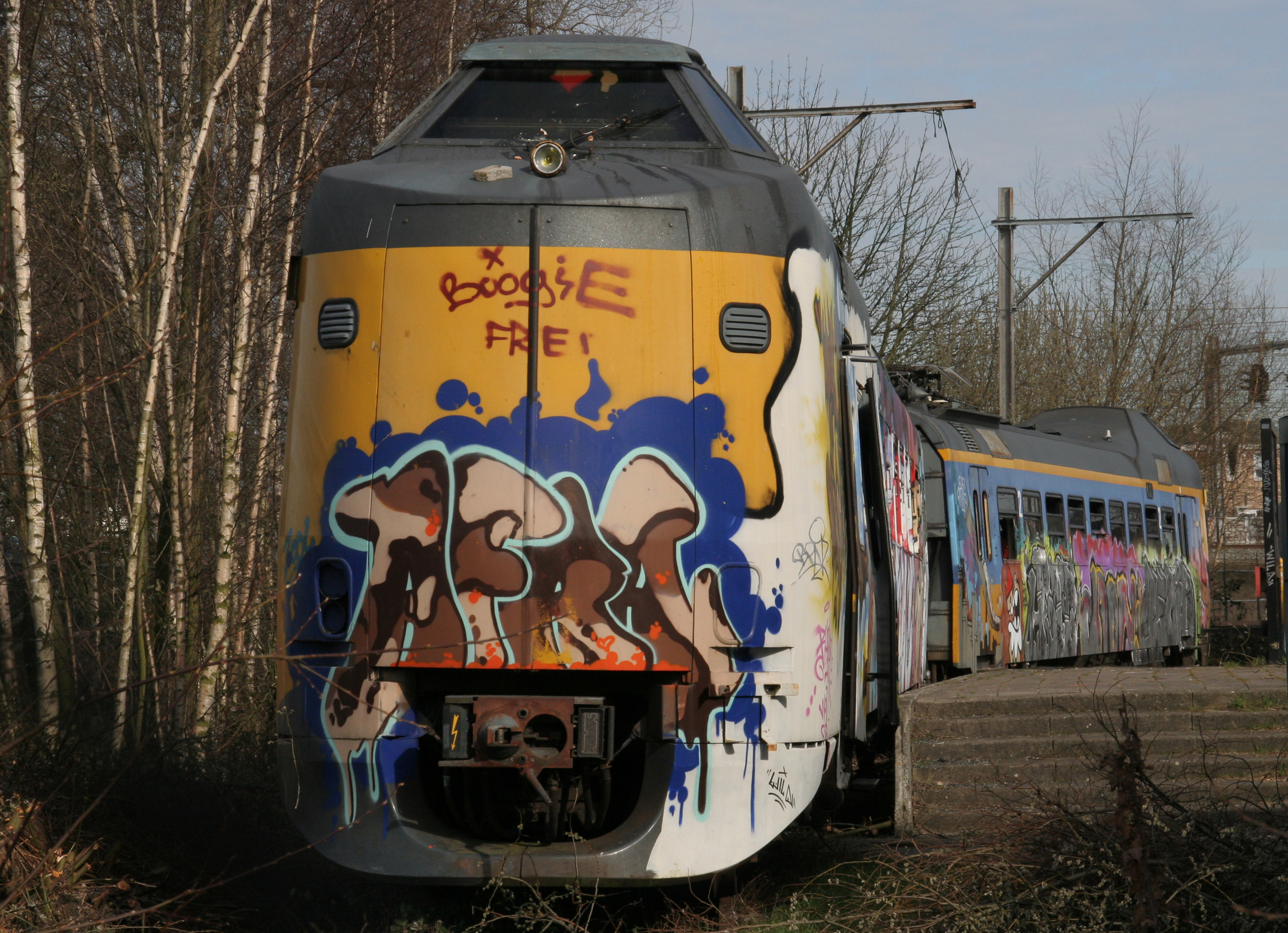
4005 abandoned in Utrecht in March 2009

The Intercity Materieel (or ICM) (lit. transl. Intercity Material – transl. Intercity Rolling Stock) is an electric multiple unit (EMU) train type operated by the Nederlandse Spoorwegen in the Netherlands. The train received the nickname Koploper, because it had a so-called "walk through head". After these trains were modernized, the "walk through heads" were removed. The modernized train sets are referred to as Intercity Materieel Modern (ICMm).

The prototypes were built in 1976, with full-scale production lasting from 1983 to 1994 by Talbot. The first train sets came into service in 1977. The trains run daily on the Dutch rail network and, together with the VIRM, form the most important equipment on services connecting the Randstad with the rest of the country.

== Names ==
- Intercity Materieel
- Koploper
- ICM
- ICMm

ICM is short for "Intercity Materieel", which means "Intercity rolling stock". The "m" in ICMm indicates that it is modernized.

== General information ==
The trains are designed for long-distance intercity services. Their maximum allowed operating speed is 140km/h, although their engines are designed to reach a top speed of 180km/h. Their cabs are on the roof, which initially allowed through gangways between sets when coupled together, though the gangways were removed during their refurbishment, as they were deemed too unreliable. Refurbishment of sets began in late 2006 and was completed in 2011. The trains have compartments in the 1st class accommodation.

== Subseries ==
=== ICM-0 ===
In 1977, a prototype batch numbered 4001–4007 were delivered. They first operated between Eindhoven and Venlo and then later between Amsterdam and Nijmegen. These were taken out of service in 2003, as NS considered them to be too expensive to keep running.

=== ICM-1 and ICM-2 ===
These were numbered 4011–4097 and were first introduced into service in 1983. All were delivered by 1990. These had been adjusted to remove the faults of the ICM-0. The ICM-1 series (4011-4050) are resistance controlled, this is a traditional method used to regulate the speed and torque of direct current (DC) traction motors in electric trains by placing heavy-duty resistors in series with the motors. The ICM-2 series (4051–4097) are Thyristor controlled. In 2024 unit 4011 was taken out of service and transferred to the Railway Museum in Utrecht for preservation.

=== ICM-3 and ICM-4 ===
Between 1990 and 1994, 50 4-car units were delivered, numbered 4201 – 4250. These have track brakes. Between 1996 and 2007, unit 4231 had a full coach converted to 1st class and was renumbered 4444. This unit only operated one train a day between Groningen and The Hague. It has since been converted back to a regular carriage, but it continued carrying number 4444 at first. After its revision in 2011, this unit was given its original number (4231) back.

== Walk-through head ==
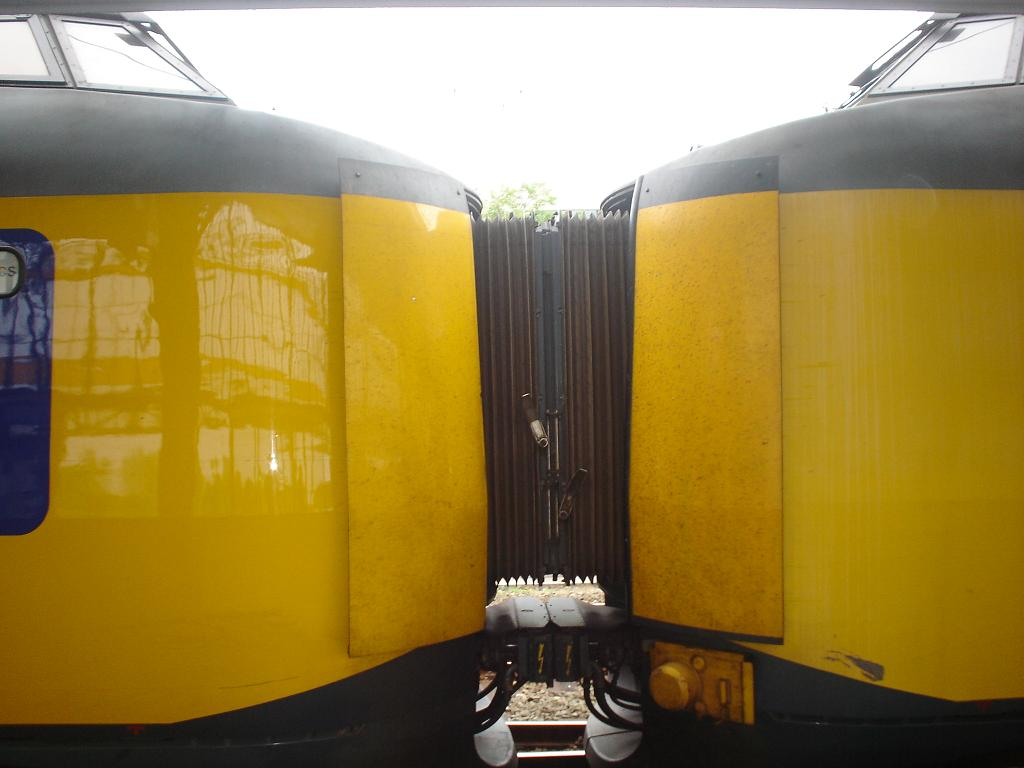
The "walk through head" in operation

The train's name Koploper means something like "forerunner" or "headwalker" as a reference to "walking through the head" ("Headwalker"(Dutch: "Doorloopkop")). When ICM units joined, the doors at the end of the train would open, and a walkway would emerge, coupling with the other set and allowing passengers and crew to walk through to the next set. (This makes it easy for conductors to check tickets and check on the security of the passengers. In addition, each set had catering carts before they were abolished in 2003). Starting from 2005 these gangways were no longer used. The reason given was that they were not often used, but they also had many technical problems that made the trains late on a regular basis. During their refurbishment from 2006 onwards, these hallways were permanently sealed shut and the doors at the heads of the train were replaced by a light polyester plate, saving the NS maintenance costs.

== Refurbishment and renewal ==
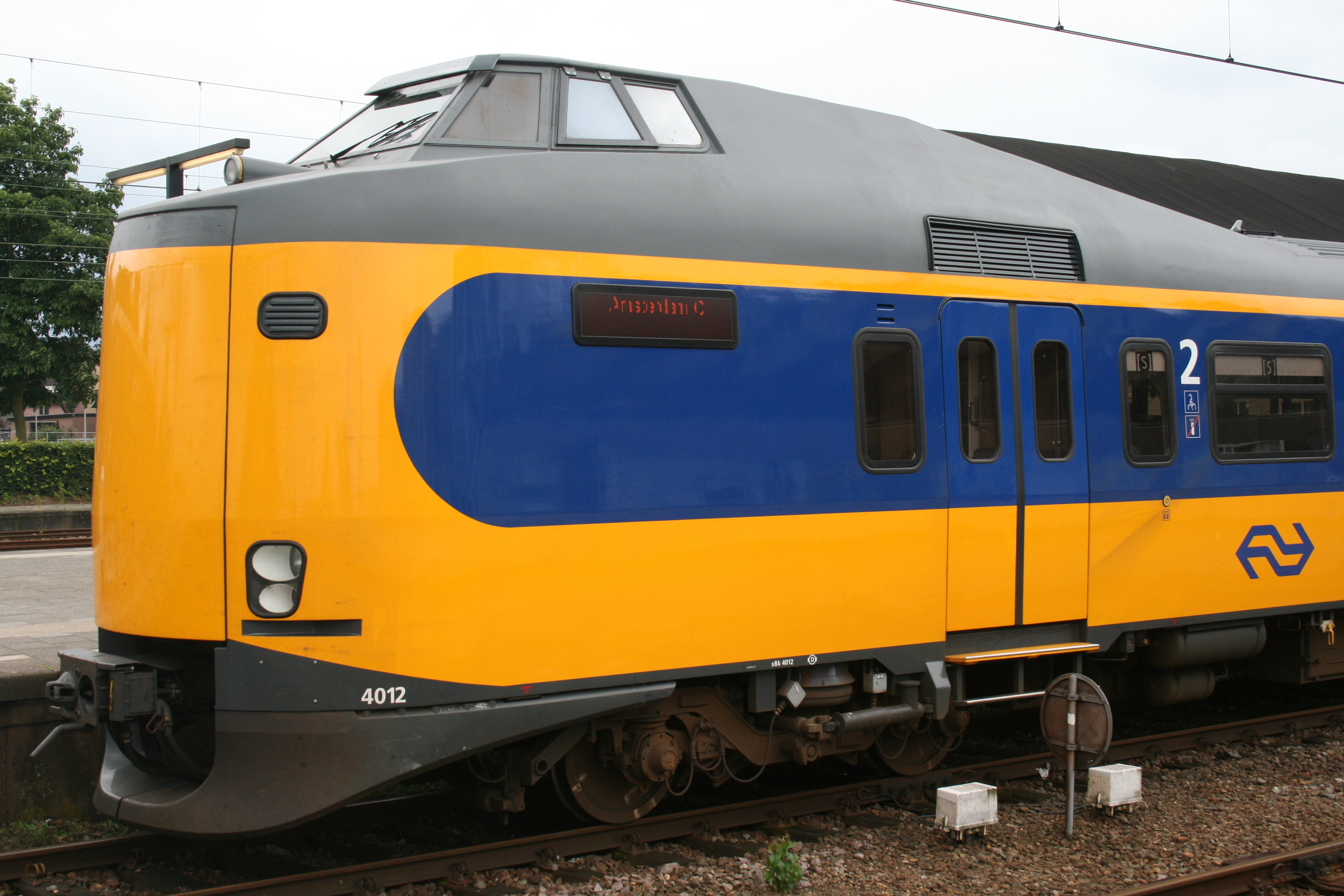
4012 at Apeldoorn

From November 2006, the Koploper went through a process of refurbishment. The first train left NedTrain's workshop in Haarlem in April 2007 and then put into the regular service. To distinguish the not yet modernized sets from the modernized sets, modernized train sets are referred to as ICMm. These sets feature new interiors with 13% more seats. One could distinguish apparent differences between 1st and 2nd class. The first class consists of red seats and second class consists of blue seats, equal to SGMm units. Other improvement include the addition of a wheelchair toilet, air conditioning, OBIS, and digital travel information. On the exterior, the train sets were repainted showing blue window surrounds curving at the ends of units. Numbers are now nearer the front of the train. The connectors diverting the train compartments were revealed and digital destination screens were put at the trains ends. The renewal of the series 4011–4097 was completed in June 2010. Refurbishing and renewing of the 4-car units took place between February 2010 and July 2011.

== Adverts ==
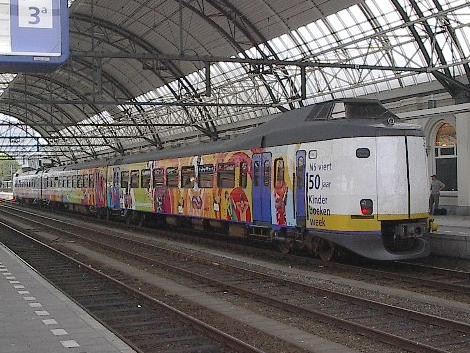
4028 at Zwolle

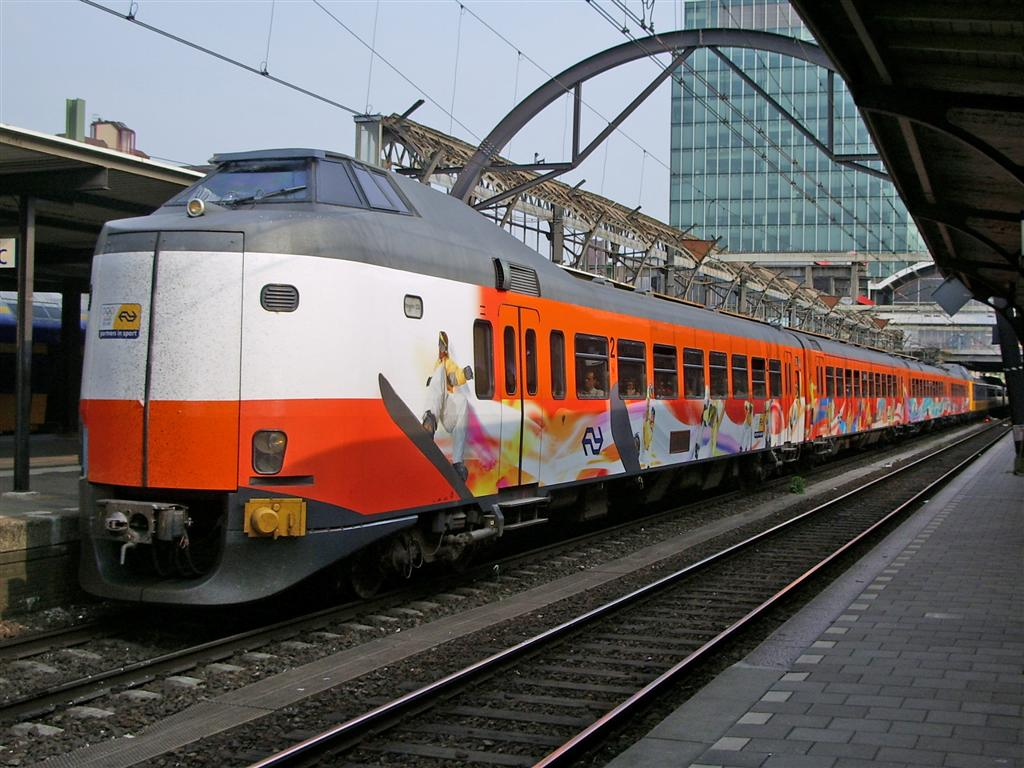
Olympic livery

Between 1986 and 2002 many sets featured adverts.

- In 1986, in relation to the opening of the Amsterdam–Schiphol railway line, two units were painted in the colours of airplanes; 4011 was painted in KLM colours and 4012 in the colours of Martinair
- 4011, 4012 and 4024 were painted in the colours of Aegon
- 4050 was painted in the colours of Randstad NV and later in De Lage Landen colours
- 4023 advertised the Groninger Museum, but in NS colours from 1999; this train had white doors at the end and also featured altered interiors
- 4028 was temporarily stickered as a Children's Book Week Train in 2004
- 4201, 4240 and 4241 had Orange Olympic adverts, which featured sportsman on the side of the train. VIRM 9520 and 9525 also featured Orange Olympic adverts; during the refurbishments, these adverts were removed

== Services operated ==
Series	Train Type	Route	Material	Notes	
500	Intercity	Rotterdam Centraal – Rotterdam Alexander – Gouda – Utrecht Centraal – Amersfoort – Zwolle – Assen – Groningen	ICM, DDZ		
600	Intercity	Rotterdam Centraal – Rotterdam Alexander – Gouda – Utrecht Centraal – Amersfoort – Zwolle – Meppel – Steenwijk – Heerenveen – Leeuwarden	ICM, DDZ		
700	Intercity	Den Haag Centraal – Leiden Centraal – Schiphol Airport – Amsterdam Zuid - Almere Centrum – Lelystad Centrum - Zwolle – Assen – Groningen	ICM, DDZ		
1400	Nachtnet	Utrecht Centraal – Amsterdam Centraal – Schiphol – Leiden Centraal – Den Haag HS – Delft – Rotterdam Centraal	ICM, DDZ, VIRM		
1500	Intercity	Amsterdam Centraal – Hilversum – Amersfoort - Apeldoorn – Deventer	ICM	One train per hour extended to Deventer	
1600	Intercity	Schiphol Airport – Amsterdam Zuid – Duivendrecht – Hilversum – Amersfoort – Apeldoorn – Deventer – Almelo – Hengelo – Enschede	ICM, DDZ		
1700	Intercity	Den Haag Centraal – Gouda – Utrecht Centraal – Amersfoort – Apeldoorn – Deventer – Almelo – Hengelo – Enschede	ICM, DDZ		
1800	Intercity	Den Haag Centraal – Leiden Centraal – Schiphol Airport – Amsterdam Zuid - Almere Centrum – Lelystad Centrum - Zwolle – Meppel – Steenwijk – Heerenveen – Leeuwarden	ICM, DDZ		
1900	Intercity	Dordrecht - Breda - Tilburg - Eindhoven Centraal	ICM	This service is operated only 4 times a day.	
2000	Intercity	Den Haag Centraal – Gouda – Utrecht Centraal	ICM, SLT		
2600	Intercity	Amsterdam Centraal – Almere Centrum	ICM		
6200	Intercity	Sprinter	ICM	Assen – Haren - Groningen Europapark – Groningen	
8100	Sprinter	Zwolle – Meppel – Hoogeveen – Beilen – Assen – Haren - Groningen Europapark – Groningen	ICM	DDZ en ICM	This service only operates once per hour on Sundays until 4:00 pm.
9000	Sprinter	Meppel – Steenwijk – Wolvega – Heerenveen – Akkrum – Grou-Jirnsum – Leeuwarden	ICM		
11400	Intercity	Rotterdam Centraal - Gouda	ICM, VIRM		
11600	Intercity	Schiphol Airport – Amsterdam Zuid – Duivendrecht – Hilversum – Amersfoort – Amersfoort Schothorst	ICM, VIRM		
11700	Intercity	Den Haag Centraal – Gouda – Utrecht Centraal – Amersfoort – Amersfoort Schothorst	ICM, VIRM		

== See also ==
- 183 series trains featuring a similar design
- 2000 and 2100 class railcars that featured a similar design

== Gallery ==
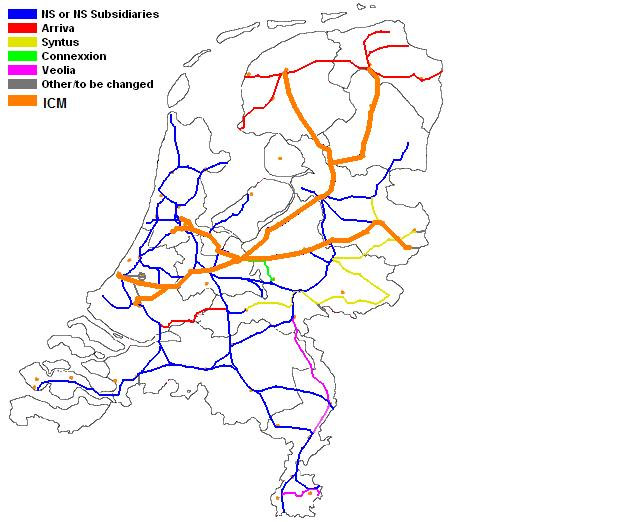
Operating area for the 2010 timetable.

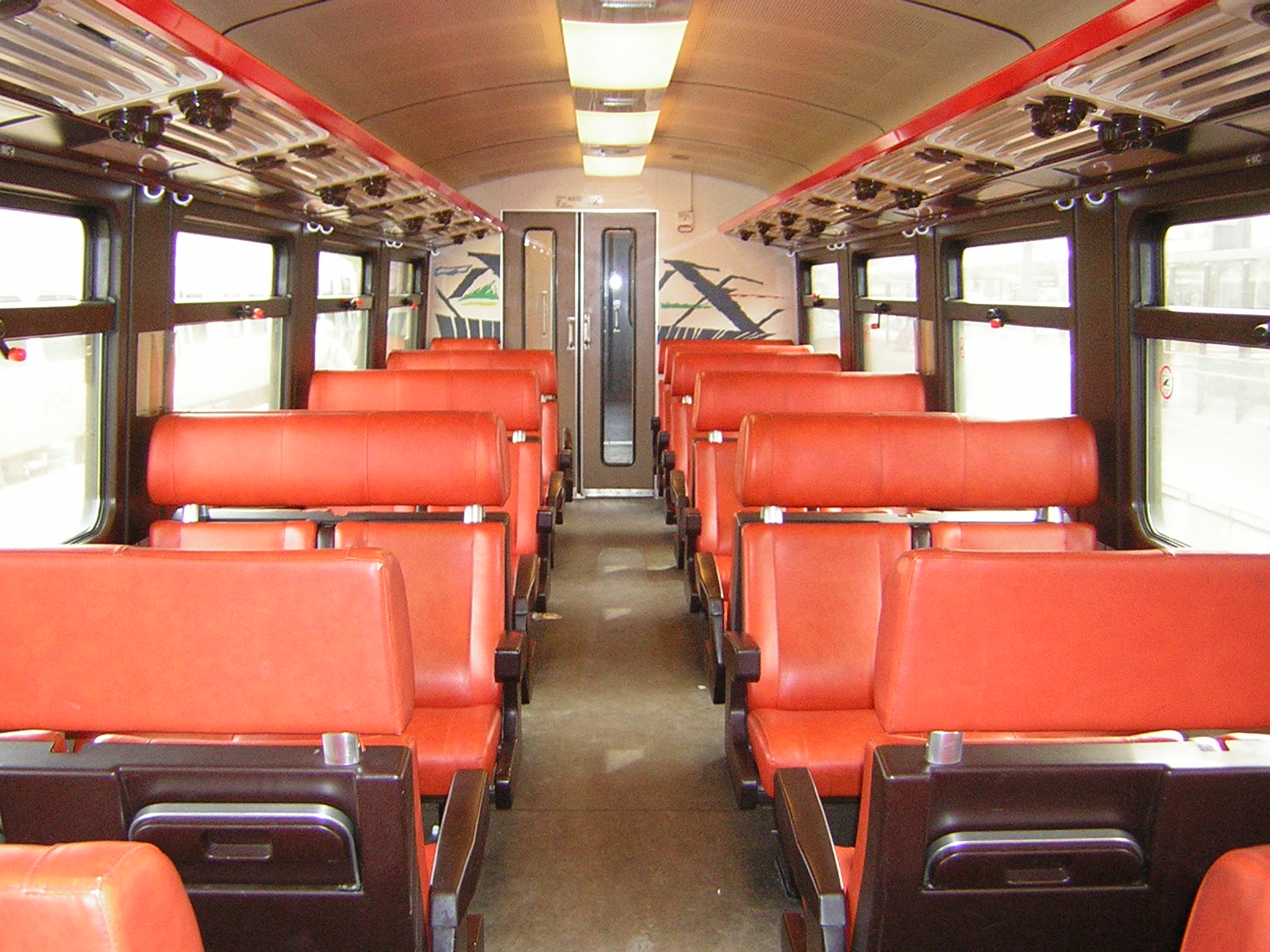
2nd class, unrefurbished interior of 4020.

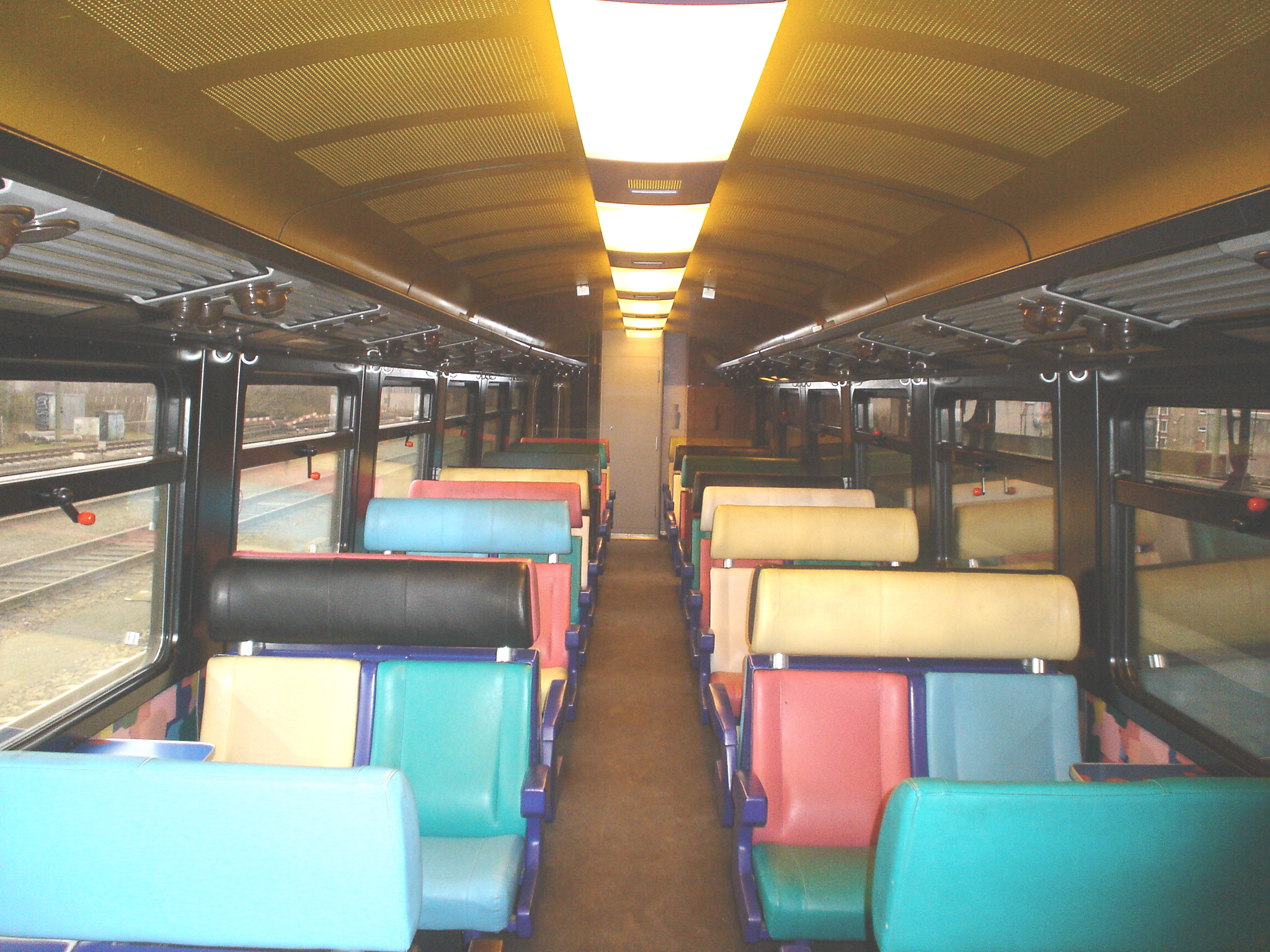
The 2nd class interior of 4023, unique design for special livery carried.

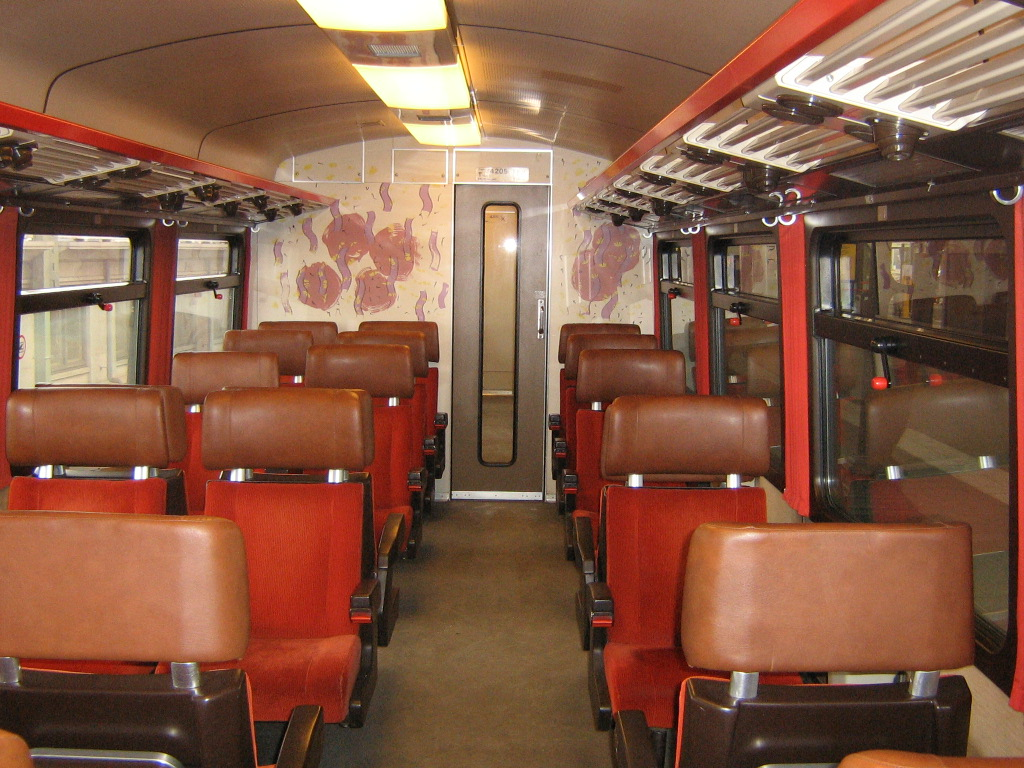
1st class, the unrefurbished interior of 4205.

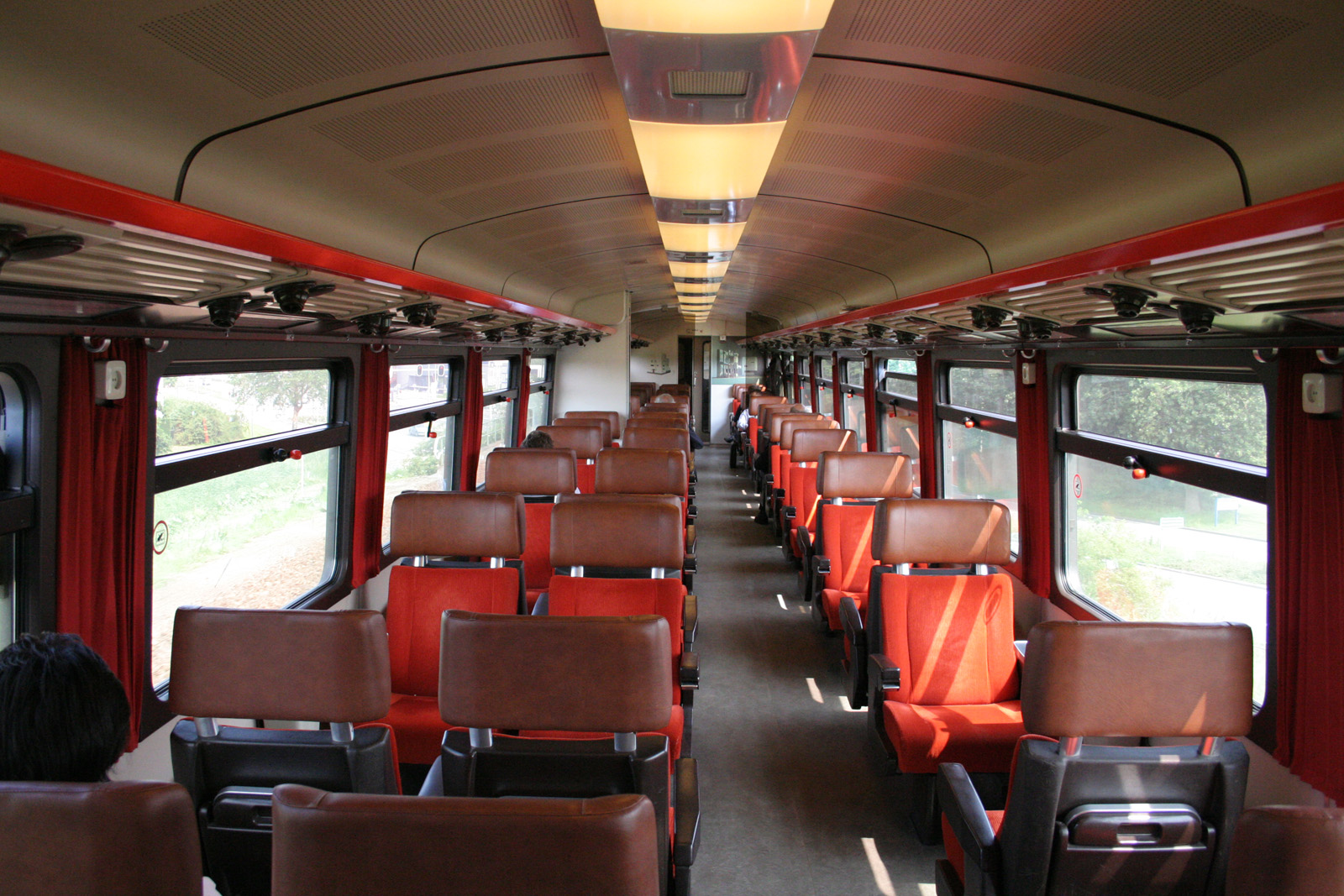
The 1st class interior of special unit 4444.

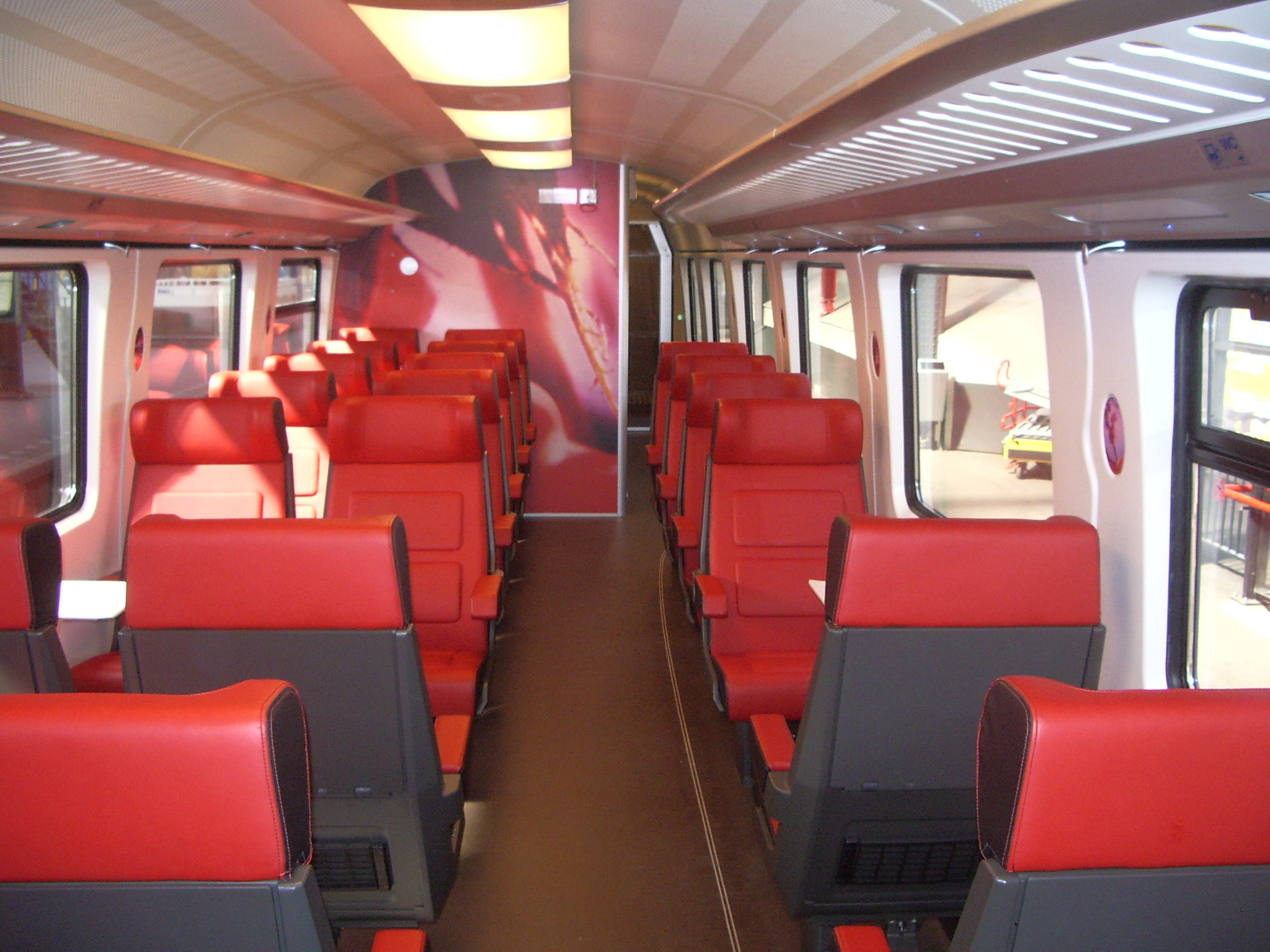
1st class, refurbished interior of 4011.

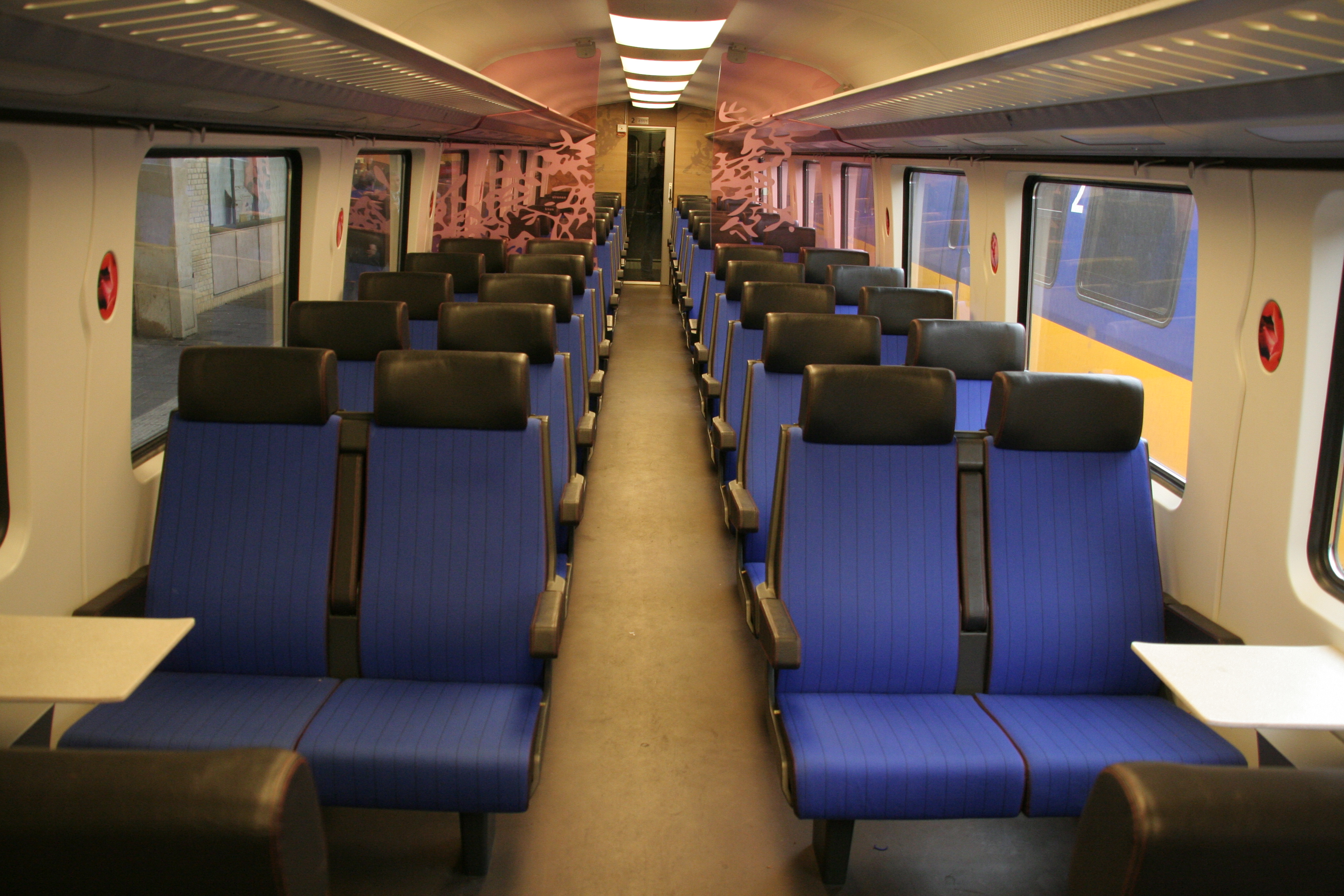
2nd class, refurbished interior.

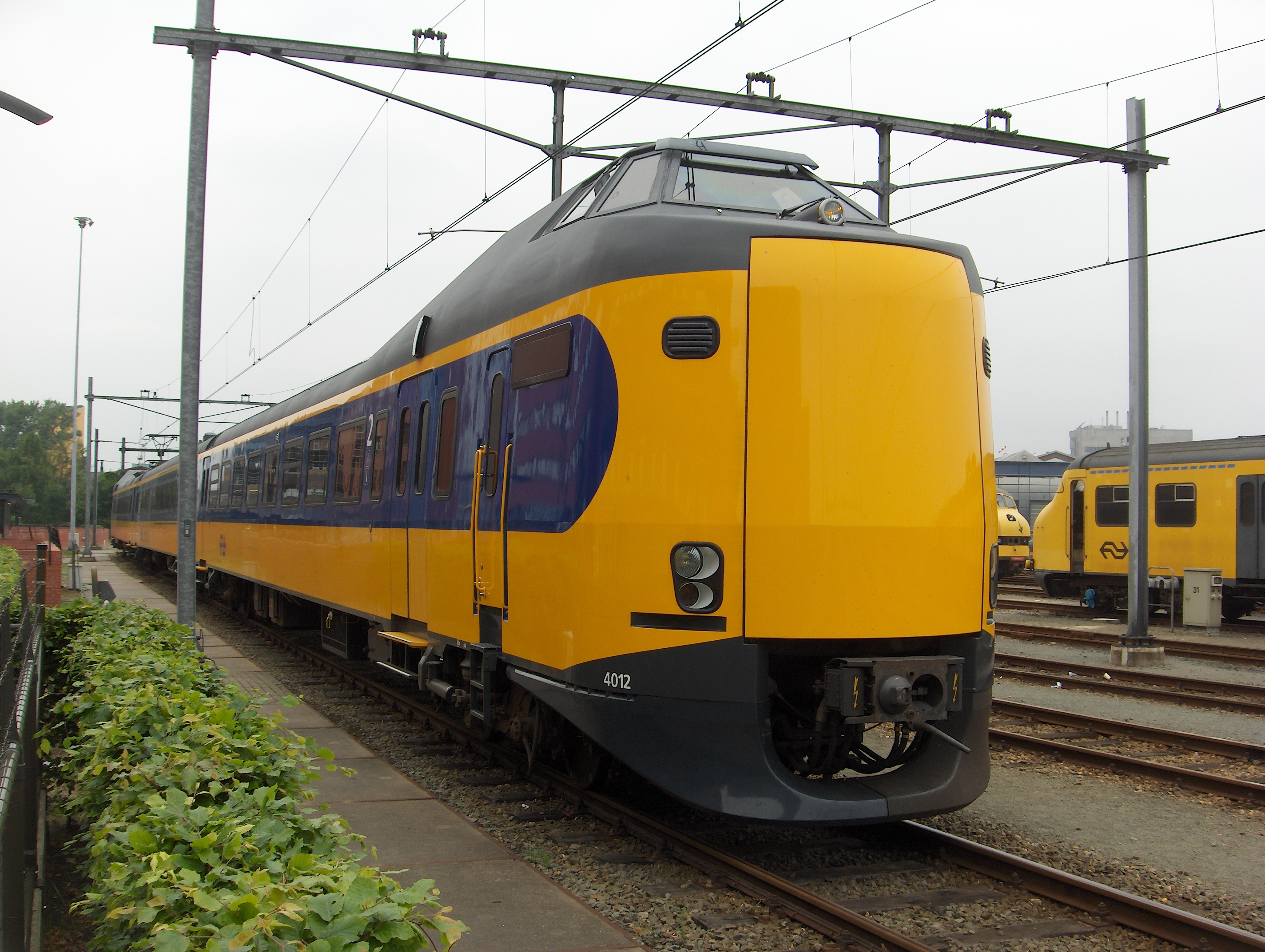
Refurbished 4012.

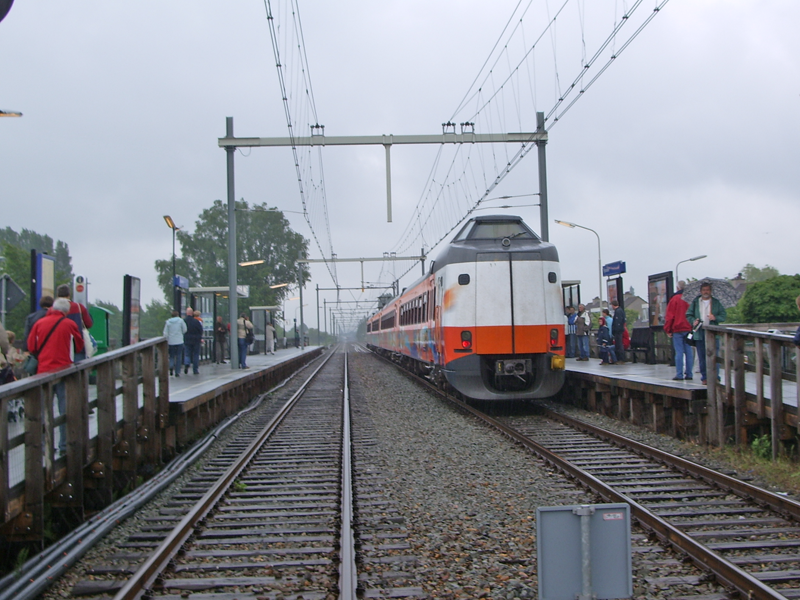
Olympic set at Pijnacker (Now RandstadRail station).

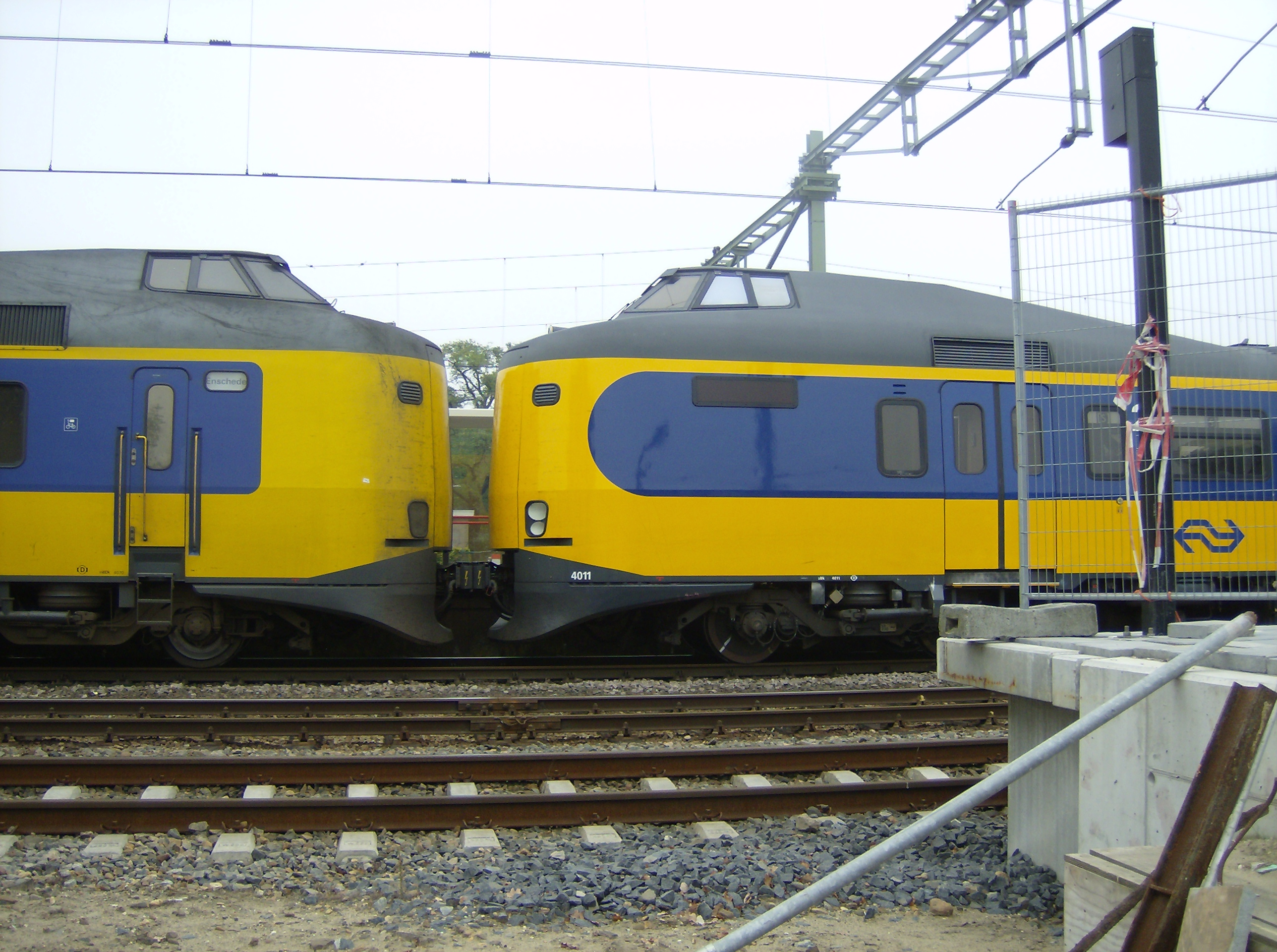
The difference in cab ends (Unrefurbished left, refurbished right).

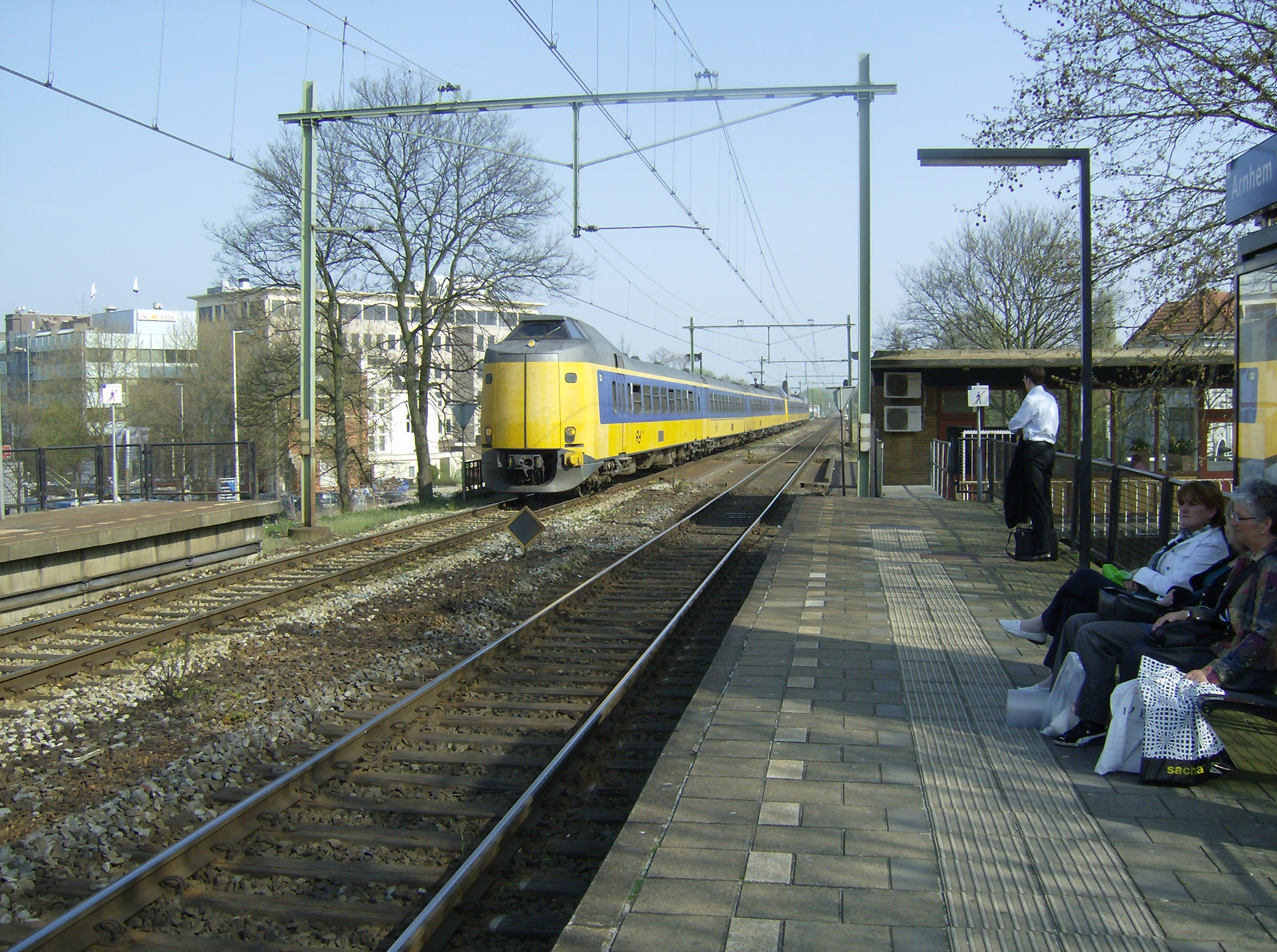
Unrefurbished sets passing through Arnhem Velperpoort in 2007.

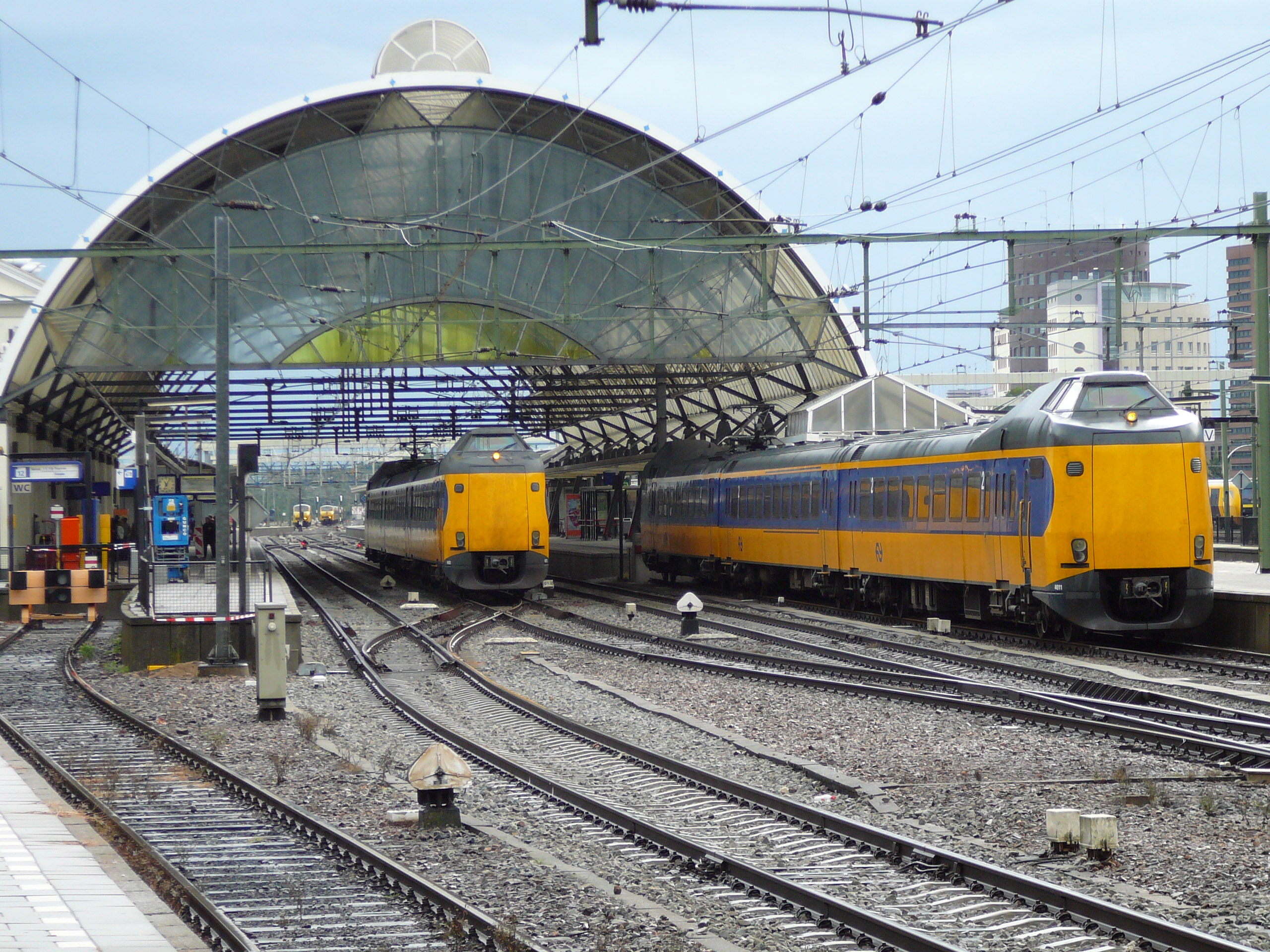
Refurbished sets 4011 and 4012 at Zwolle.

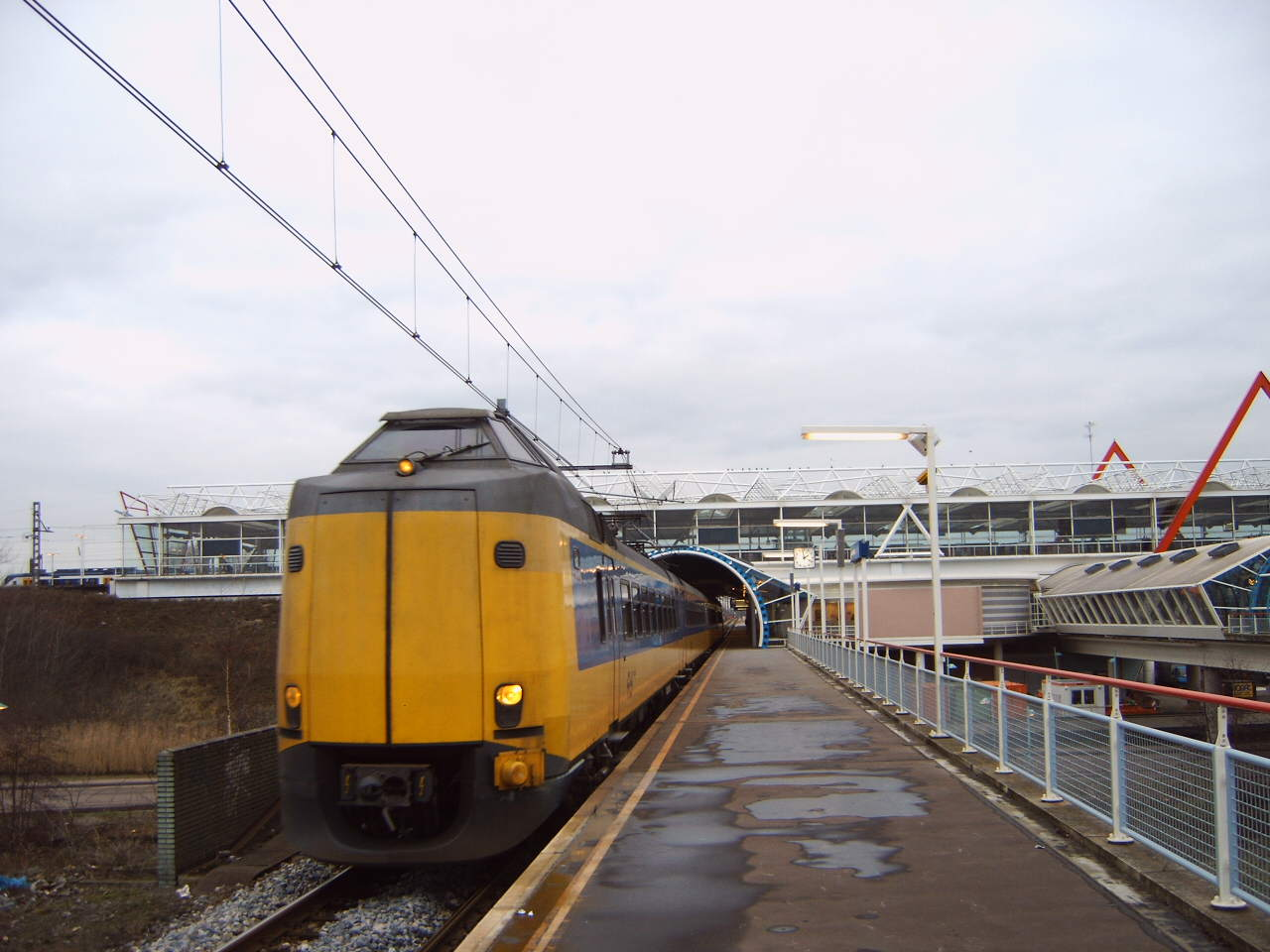
Unrefurbished set at Duivendrecht (Lower level).

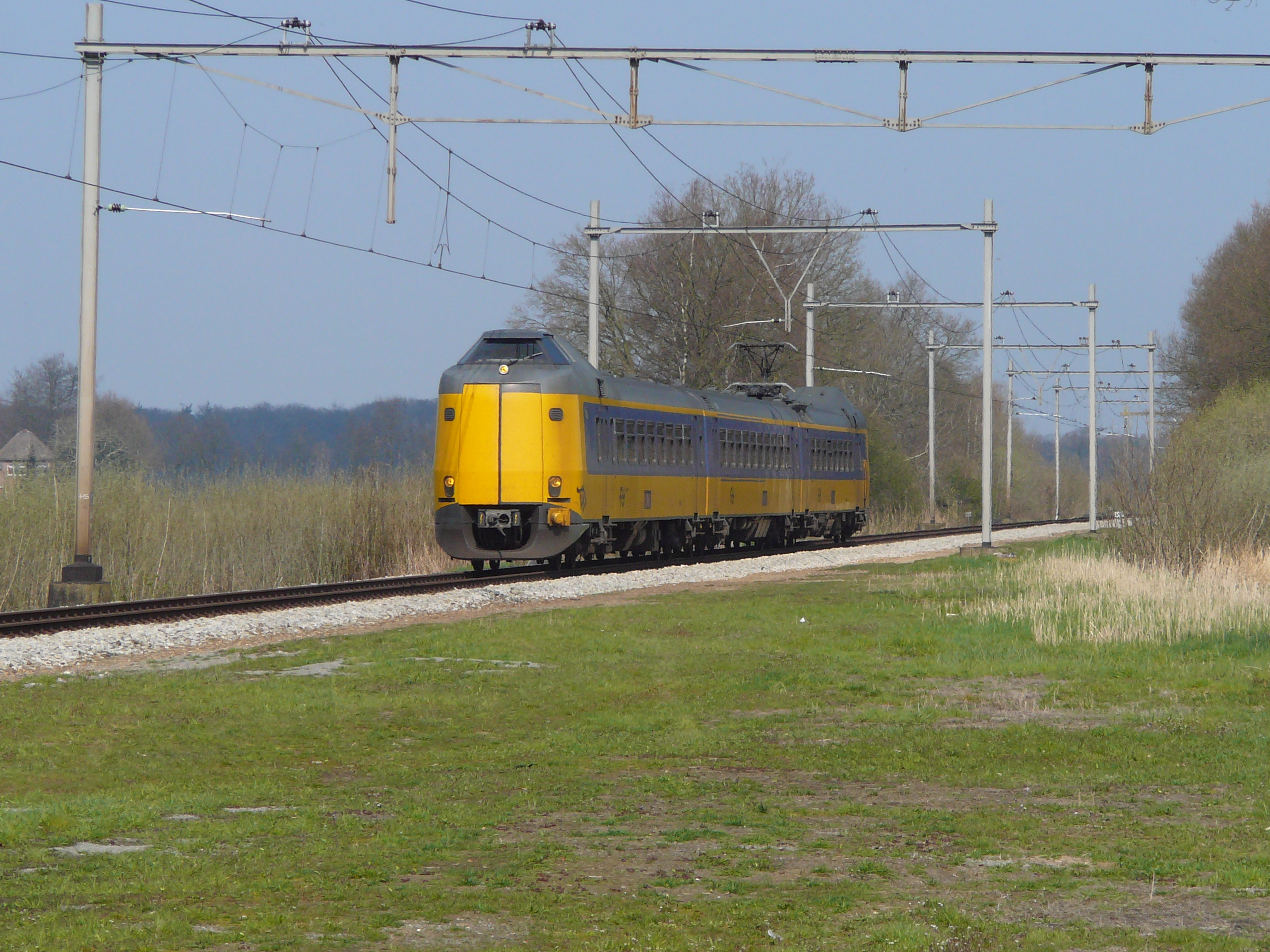
Unrefurbished set 4085 approaching Deventer from Zwolle.

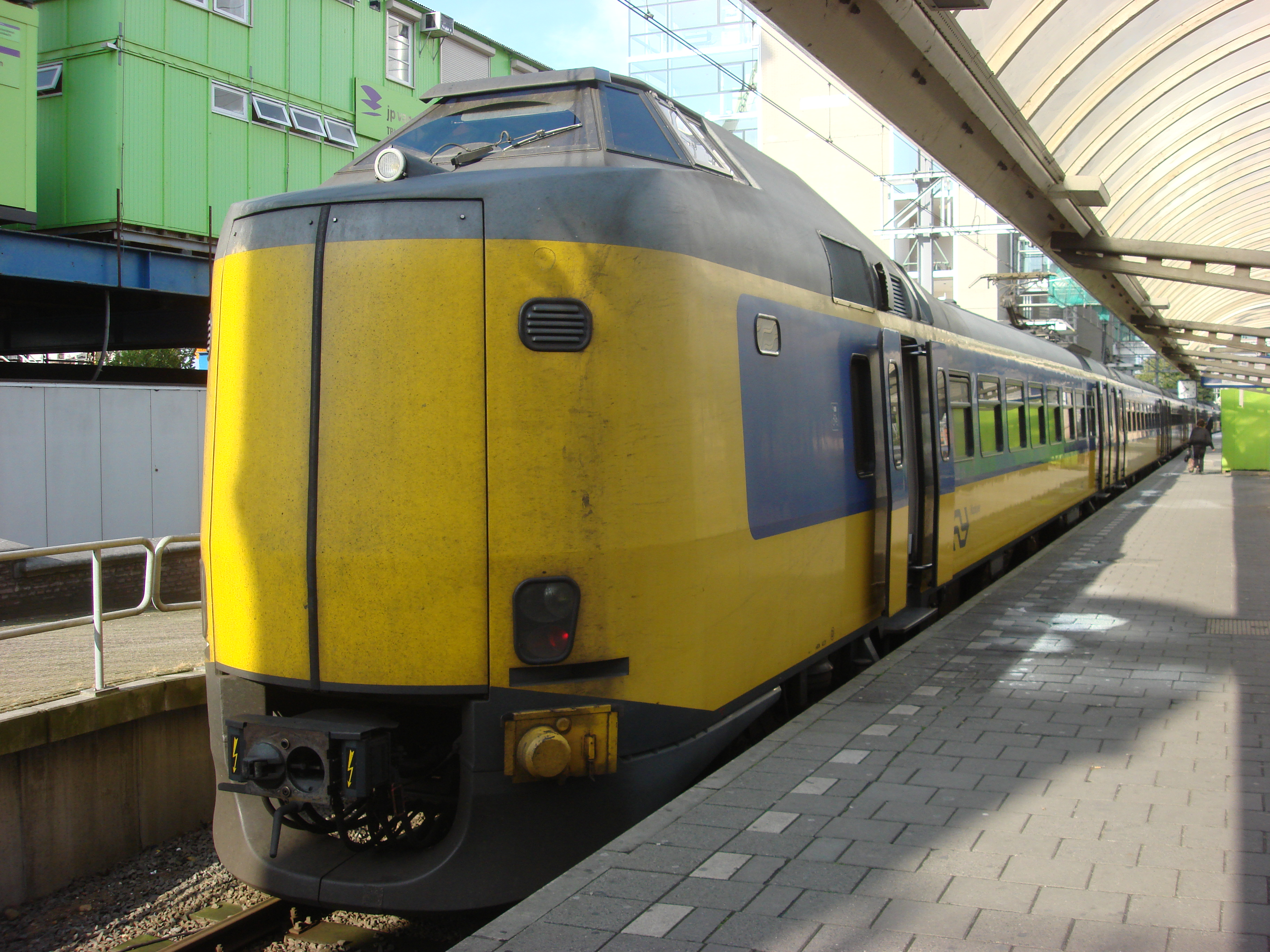
Unrefurbished set at platform 1 of Amsterdam Centraal.

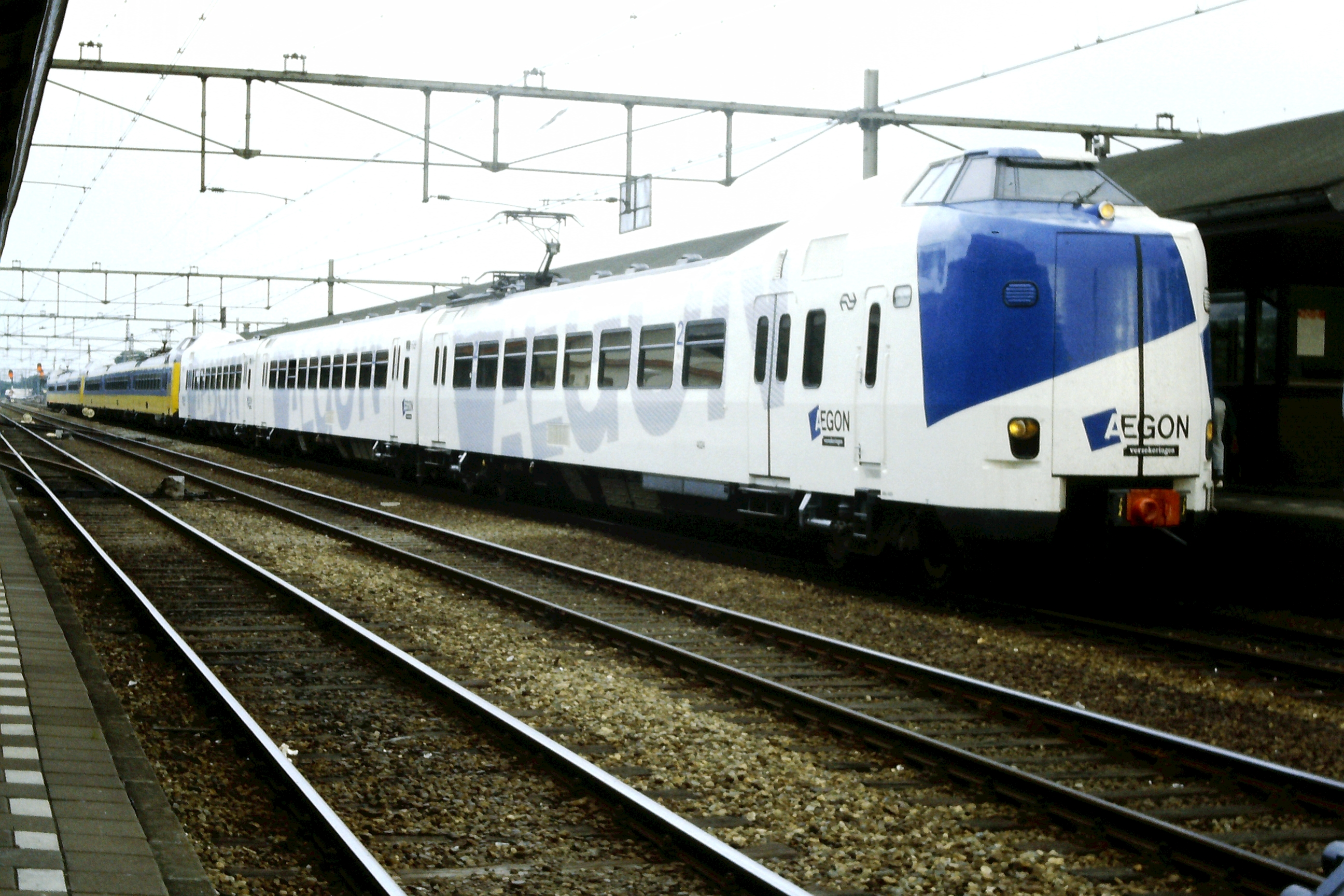
ICM with Aegon advert at Apeldoorn.
