= Assen-Zuid railway station =

Assen Zuid

General information
- Location: Netherlands
- Coordinates: 52°59′0″N 6°34′00″E
- Line: Meppel–Groningen railway
Location
- Location within Netherlands

Assen-Zuid (English: Assen South) is a planned railway station in Assen, Netherlands.

Assen city official Alex Langius said in February 2012 that the station is expected to be built south of the N33 road, between Assen railway station and Beilen railway station, along the existing Meppel-Groningen railway. Langius described the station as an 'events station', meaning it would be used to transport train passengers to events such as those at motorsport race track TT Circuit Assen.

Langius said discussions are ongoing between Assen, Nederlandse Spoorwegen, ProRail and the provincial government. He said a decision about the start of the construction of the station is expected by the end of 2012, with construction possibly beginning in 2014 or 2015. It is planned to eventually transform Assen-Zuid into a full station with regular service.

== See also ==
- Assen railway station
- List of railway stations in Drenthe
