= Assen railway station =

Railway station in Assen, Netherlands

Assen
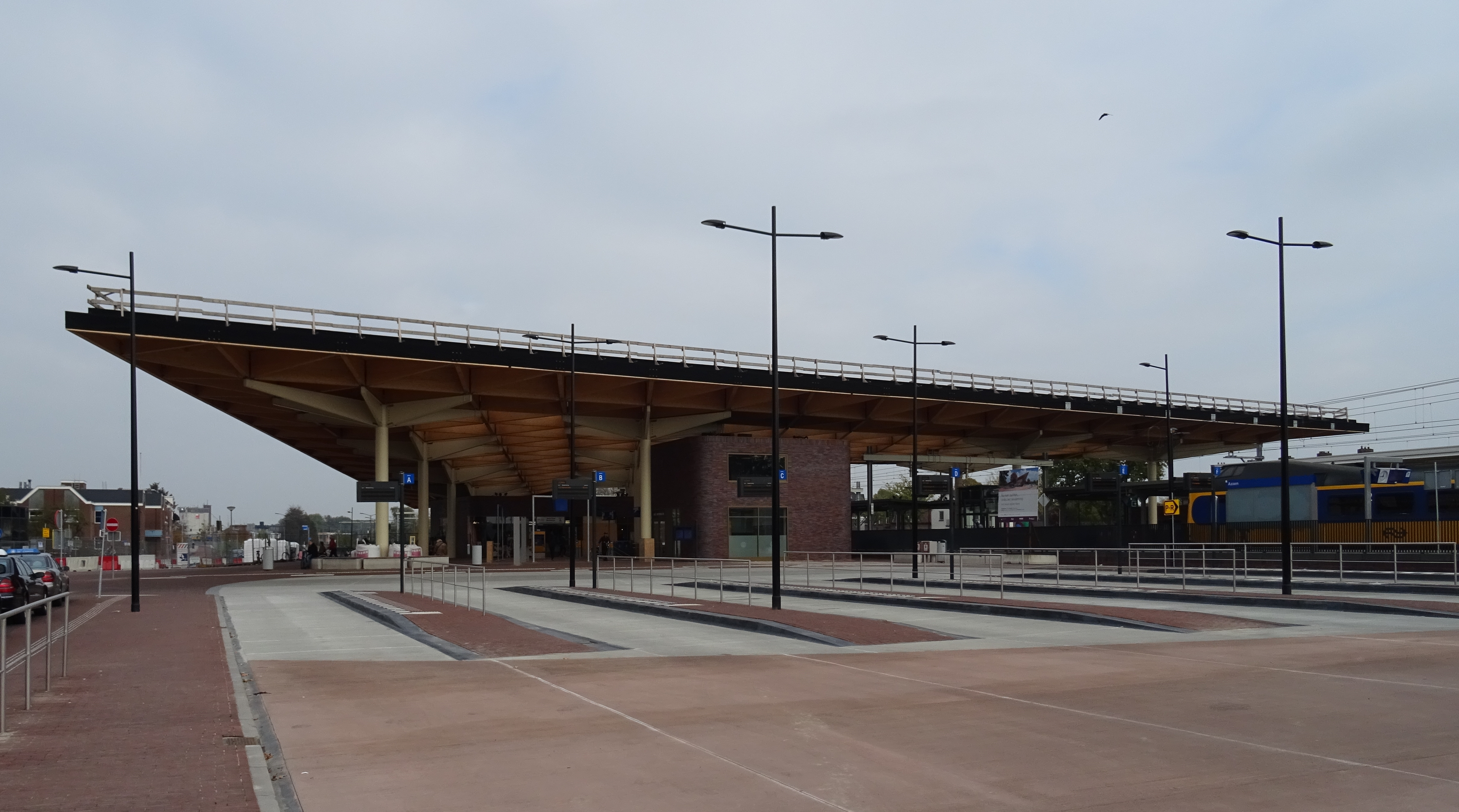

General information
- Location: Netherlands
- Coordinates: 52°59′30″N 6°34′14″E
- Line: Meppel–Groningen railway
- Connections: VMNN: 1, 2, 3, 4 (shared with Qbuzz), 12, 53; Qbuzz: 4 (shared with VMNN), 14, 15, 18, 19, 20, 21, 22, 24, 50, 58, 83, 110, 419, 603, 807

Other information
- Station code: Asn

History
- Opened: 1 May 1870

Services
Preceding station	Nederlandse Spoorwegen	Following station
Zwolle towards Den Haag Centraal	NS Intercity 500	Groningen Terminus
Zwolle towards Schiphol Airport	NS Intercity 700	Groningen Terminus
Beilen towards Zwolle	NS Sprinter 6100	Haren towards Groningen
Terminus	NS Sprinter 6200 Mon-Thurs Peak only	Haren towards Groningen
Preceding station	Arriva Netherlands	Following station
Zwolle towards Schiphol Airport	Nachttrein 32780 Friday night only	Groningen Terminus
Location
- Location within Netherlands

Assen (Dutch pronunciation: [ˈɑsə(n)]; abbreviation: Asn) is a railway station located in Assen, Netherlands. The station was opened on 1 May 1870 and is located on the Meppel–Groningen railway. The station is operated by Nederlandse Spoorwegen. A new station building was opened in 2020, featuring a large wooden triangular roof with windows allowing light down to the indoor spaces and platforms, replacing the previous building from 1988. From 1902 until 1947, there was also a railway line to Gasselternijveen, where trains connected to the railway line to Stadskanaal.

== Future ==
The railway station and station area, is to be upgraded along with other public works around the city of Assen, such as the creation of a harbour quarter, joining up the canal system through the city and creation of a city boulevard. The road that passes outside the station will become an underground section. While above ground it will become pedestrianised towards the city centre and the new harbour quarter.

The upgraded station will accommodate an underground bicycle storage area, and cycle shop replacing the current outside stalls for rail users. The contract to re-design Assen station was won by the Powerhouse Company and De Zwarte Hond.

FlorijnAs is overseeing the wider works of improvement in the city and their website, available in Dutch and English, explains that: "Towards the end of 2015 the relocation of the cables and pipes for the station begins. Then the implementation of the road tunnel is planned for 2016, and In mid-2016, ProRail is to start work with the tracks and the platform tunnel." However 27 August 2015 saw the website spoorPRO release an article, stating that the works on the tracks have been pushed back till 2017, due to "hard work being scheduled elsewhere on other projects in 2016", while further in the article ProRail and contractors are stated to have said they are "currently working on the biggest track renewal since the birth of the railways".

While there is expected to be disruption from these works for everyday users, the station is currently not due to close during the scheduled works.

There are plans to open a station south of this one, called Assen Zuid, which will serve southern Assen as well as the TT Circuit Assen.

== Train services ==
Series	Route	Stock	Service	Operator
Intercity 500	Groningen – Assen – Zwolle – Amersfoort – Utrecht – Gouda – The Hague	ICM, NS DDZ	1/hour	Nederlandse Spoorwegen
Intercity 700	Groningen – Assen – Zwolle – Lelystad – Almere – Amsterdam South – Schiphol Airport	ICM, NS DDZ	1/hour	Nederlandse Spoorwegen
Sprinter 6100	Groningen – Groningen Europapark – Haren – Assen – Beilen – Hoogeveen – Meppel – Zwolle	SNG, SLT	2/hour	Nederlandse Spoorwegen
Sprinter 6200	Groningen – Groningen Europapark – Haren – Assen	SNG	2/hour rush hour Monday until Thursday	Nederlandse Spoorwegen
Nachttrein 32790	Groningen – Assen – Zwolle – Lelystad – Almere – Amsterdam South – Schiphol Airport	Stadler GTW	Only Friday night	Arriva

== Bus services ==
Line	Route	Operator	Notes
1	Assen TT-circuit – Ziekenhuis (Hospital) – Station – Centrum (town centre) – Industriegebied – Marsdijk	Qbuzz and CTS	
7	Assen Kloosterveen – Pittelo – De Lariks – Centrum (town centre) – Station – Wilhelmina Ziekenhuis (Hospital) – Vredeveld – Anreep	CTS	No service on evenings and Sundays.
8	Assen Kloosterveen – Baggelhuizen – Ziekenhuis (Hospital) – Station – Centrum (town centre) – De Lariks – Noorderpark – Peelo – Marsdijk	CTS	No service on evenings and Sundays.
14	Leeuwarden – Garyp – Nijega – Drachten – Ureterp – Wijnjewoude – Donkerbroek – Oosterwolde – Weper – Veenhuizen – Huis ter Heide – Assen	Arriva	After 21:00 and on Sunday mornings, the route between Oosterwolde and Assen is only served if called one hour before its supposed departure ("belbus"). The rest of the route is operated normally.
20	Assen – Smilde – Dieverbrug – Diever/Dwingeloo – Dieverbrug – Uffelte – Havelte – Meppel	Qbuzz and CTS	
21	Assen – Rolde – Grolloo – Schoonloo – De Kiel – Schoonoord – Sleen – Erm – Emmen	Qbuzz and Taxi Dorenbos	
22	Assen – Graswijk – Hooghalen – Beilen – Westerbork – Wezup – Zweeloo (- Emmen)	Qbuzz and CTS	The route between Zweeloo and Emmen is only served during rush hours (excluding school breaks).
24	Assen – Rolde – Papenvoort – Borger – Buinen – Buinerveen – Nieuw Buinen – Stadskanaal – Nieuwe Pekela – Oude Pekela – Winschoten	Qbuzz	No service on Sundays. On Saturdays, this bus only operates between 1x per 2 hours between Assen and Stadskanaal.
50	Groningen – Haren – Glimmen – De Punt – Vries – Ubbena – Assen	Qbuzz	
51	Groningen – Haren – Onnen – Noordlaren – Zuidlaren – Schuilingsoord – Annen – Gieten/Anloo – Gasteren – Loon – Assen	Qbuzz and CTS	No service between Onnen and Assen on evenings and weekends.
83	Assen – Ter Aard – Zeijen – Peest – Norg – Langelo – Alteveer – Roden – Nietap – Leek	Qbuzz and Taxi Nuis	
84	Heerenveen – Lijnjeberd – Tjalleberd – Tijnje – Nij Beets – Boornbergum – Drachten – Ureterp – Frieschepalen – Bakkeveen – Waskemeer – Haulerwijk – Een – Norg – Zuidvelde – Huis ter Heide – Assen	Arriva	On Saturdays and off-peak hours during school breaks, this bus only operates between Heerenveen and Drachten Transferium Oost if called one hour before its supposed departure ("belbus"). The rest of the route is operated normally. On evenings and Sundays, the entire route is operated as a "belbus".
110	Veendam – Wildervank – Bareveld – Gieten – Rolde – Assen	Qbuzz	
114	Leeuwarden – Garyp – Nijega – Drachten – Wijnjewoude – Donkerbroek – Oosterwolde – Appelscha – Hijkersmilde – Smilde – Bovensmilde – Assen	Arriva	Mon-Fri during daytime hours only.
115	Heerenveen – Oudeschoot – Mildam – Katlijk – Nieuwehorne – Oudehorne – Jubbega – Hoornsterzwaag – Donkerbroek – Oosterwolde – Appelscha – Hijkersmilde – Smilde – Bovensmilde – Assen	Arriva	
419	Groningen – Assen	Qbuzz	2 runs during Friday late nights and 1x per hour during Saturday late nights.

== See also ==
- List of railway stations in Drenthe
