= Europapark =

Europapark may refer to:

- Europa-Park, a theme park in Rust, Germany
- Europapark, a neighborhood in Groningen, Netherlands
- Groningen Europapark railway station, a train station in Groningen, Netherlands
