= HRN =

HRN may refer to:

- Haren (NL) railway station, in the Netherlands
- Hornsey railway station in London
- Hotel Reservations Network, now Hotels.com
- H. R. Nicholls Society
- Ukrainian hryvnia, the currency of Ukraine
- Radio HRN, the first commercial radio station in Honduras; see Radio in Honduras
