= Euroborg =

Football stadium in Groningen, Netherlands

- De Groene Kathedraal (The Green Cathedral); De Groene Hel (The Green Hell)
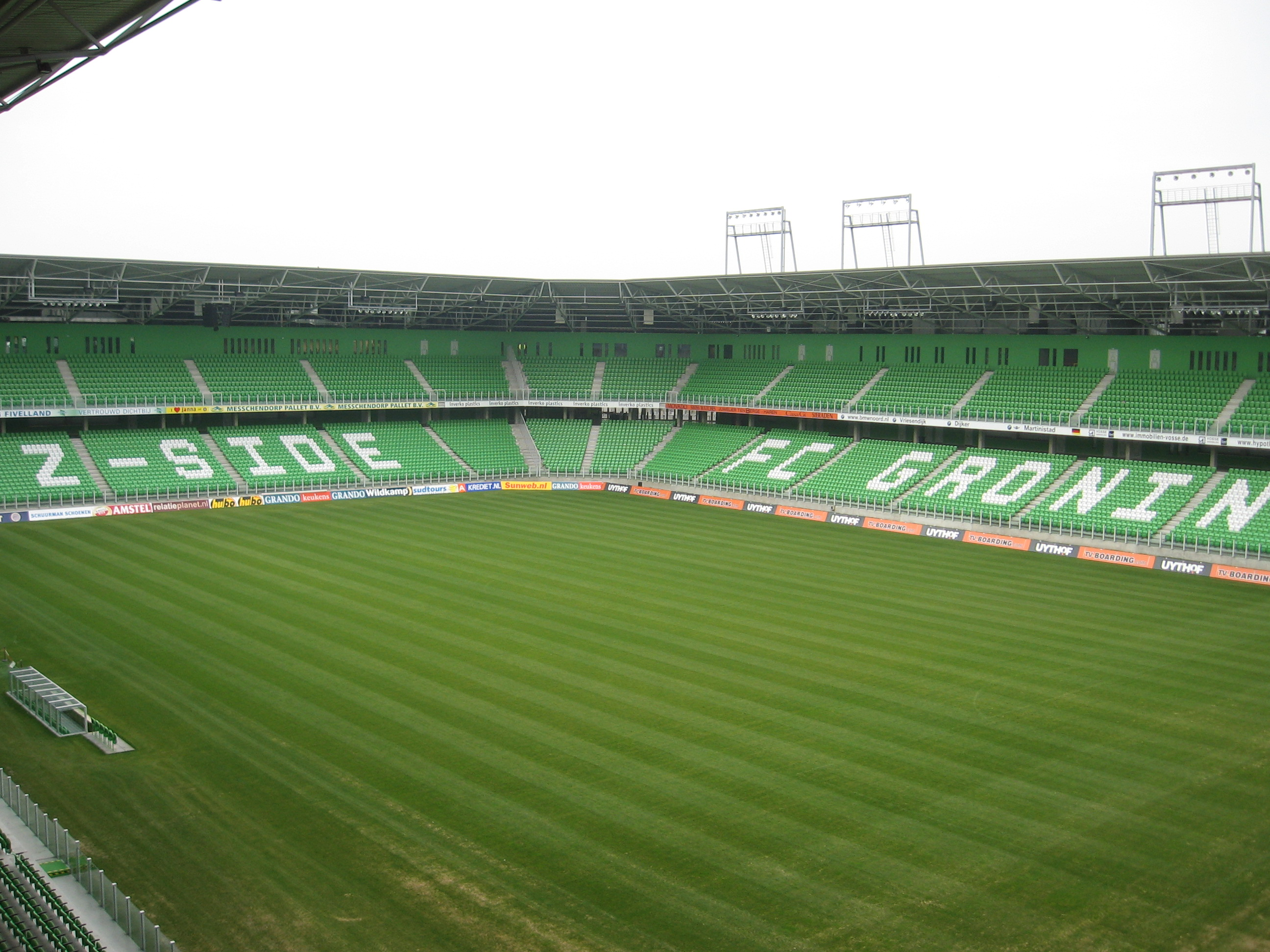
- Interior of the stadium

- Location in the Groningen Province in the Netherlands
- Location: Groningen, Netherlands
- Coordinates: 53°12′22″N 6°35′29″E
- Owner: FC Groningen
- Seating type: seated
- Capacity: 22,550
- Type: Football stadium

Construction
- Built: 2004–05
- Opened: 2006
- Architect: Wiel Arets Architects

Tenant
- FC Groningen (2006–present)

Website
- www.euroborg.nl

Euroborg (Dutch pronunciation: [ˈøːroːbɔr(ə)x]) is the stadium in Groningen, Netherlands. It is the home ground of football club FC Groningen, with a capacity of 22,550. The stadium site houses a casino, movie theater, school, supermarket, and a fitness centre. A temporary railway station at the stadium opened in late 2007, and a permanent one opened in 2013. The stadium's seats are completely clad in the club's colors of green and white, with 1,000 seats available for supporters of the away team.

== The stadium ==
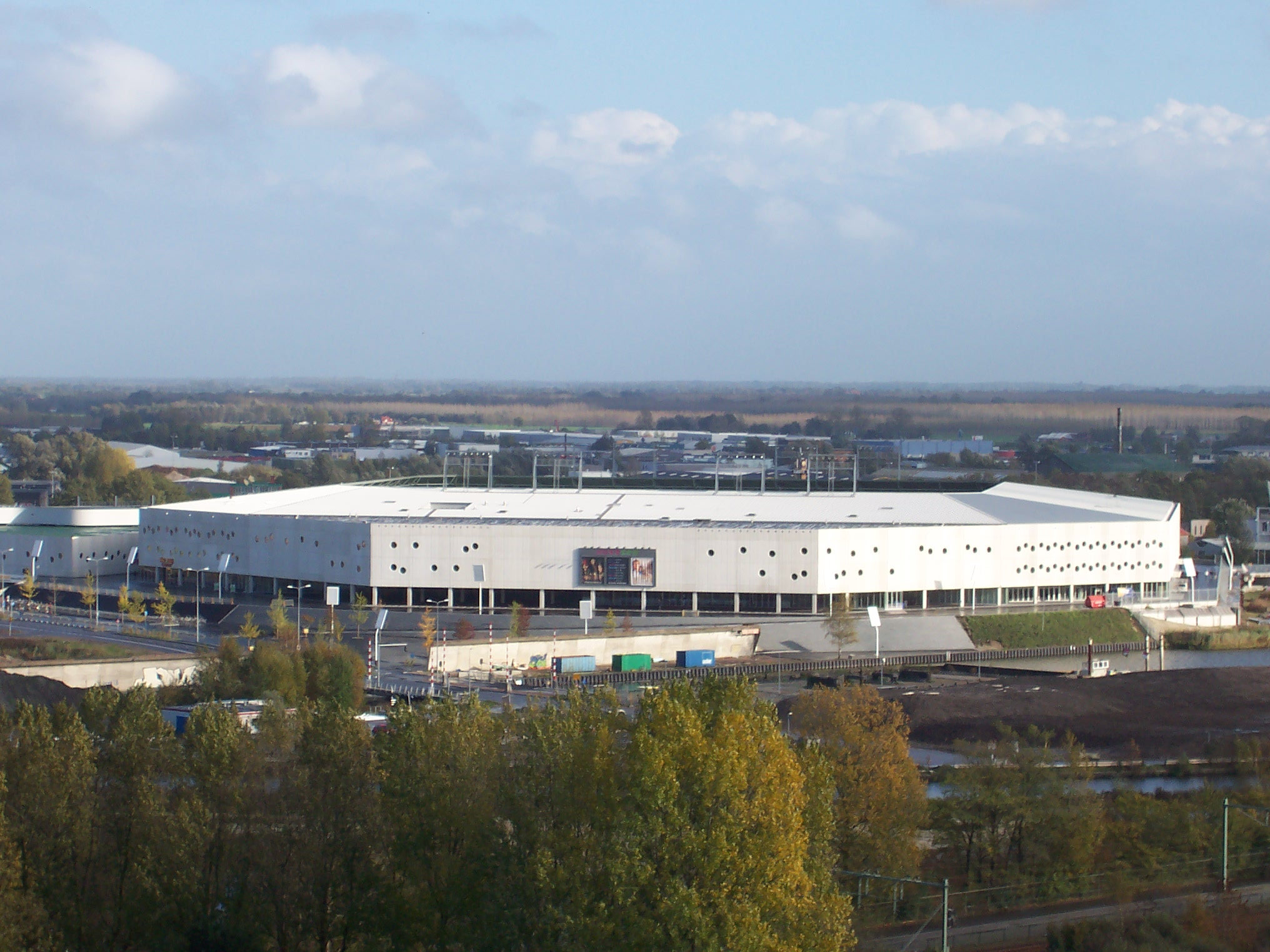
An aerial view of Euroborg

The stadium was built by a consortium of Ballast Nedam, Royal BAM Group and VolkerWessels and completed in 2006.

The stadium is nicknamed "de Groene Hel" (the Green Hell) and "de Groene Kathedraal" (the Green Cathedral).

The stadium has had several name changes; at the opening in 2006 the stadium was called Euroborg, but in 2016 the name was changed to NoordLease stadion. Due to a fusion of companies, the name was changed to Hitachi Capital Mobility Stadion in 2018. Hitachi Capital Mobility changed their official name in 2021 and they removed their name from the stadium.

== Access ==
Euroborg is easy to reach by public transport, as the train station Groningen Europapark, is located 200 meters from the stadium, and is served every hour by several trains and buses. There are also a number of car parks in the surrounding area.

== 2007 UEFA European Under-21 Championship ==
Euroborg was also one of four venues for the 2007 UEFA European U-21 Championship, which the Netherlands hosted. It was host to all group matches of Portugal and the final between the Netherlands and Serbia.

== Netherlands women's national football team ==
On 24 October 2017, the Netherlands women's team played Norway at Euroborg in front of 20,980 spectators as part of the 2019 Women's World Cup qualification. On 23 October 2020, the Netherlands qualified for UEFA Women's Euro 2021 after a victory over Estonia at Euroborg in front of 0 spectators, due to the COVID-19 pandemic.

== Netherlands men's national football team ==
On 10 June 2025, the Netherlands men's team played a 2026 World Cup qualifier match against Malta, marking their first game in Groningen since the 1980s. The Netherlands won the game 8–0.

== See also ==
- List of football stadiums in the Netherlands
