= Haren (NL) railway station =

Railway station in Haren, Netherlands

Haren
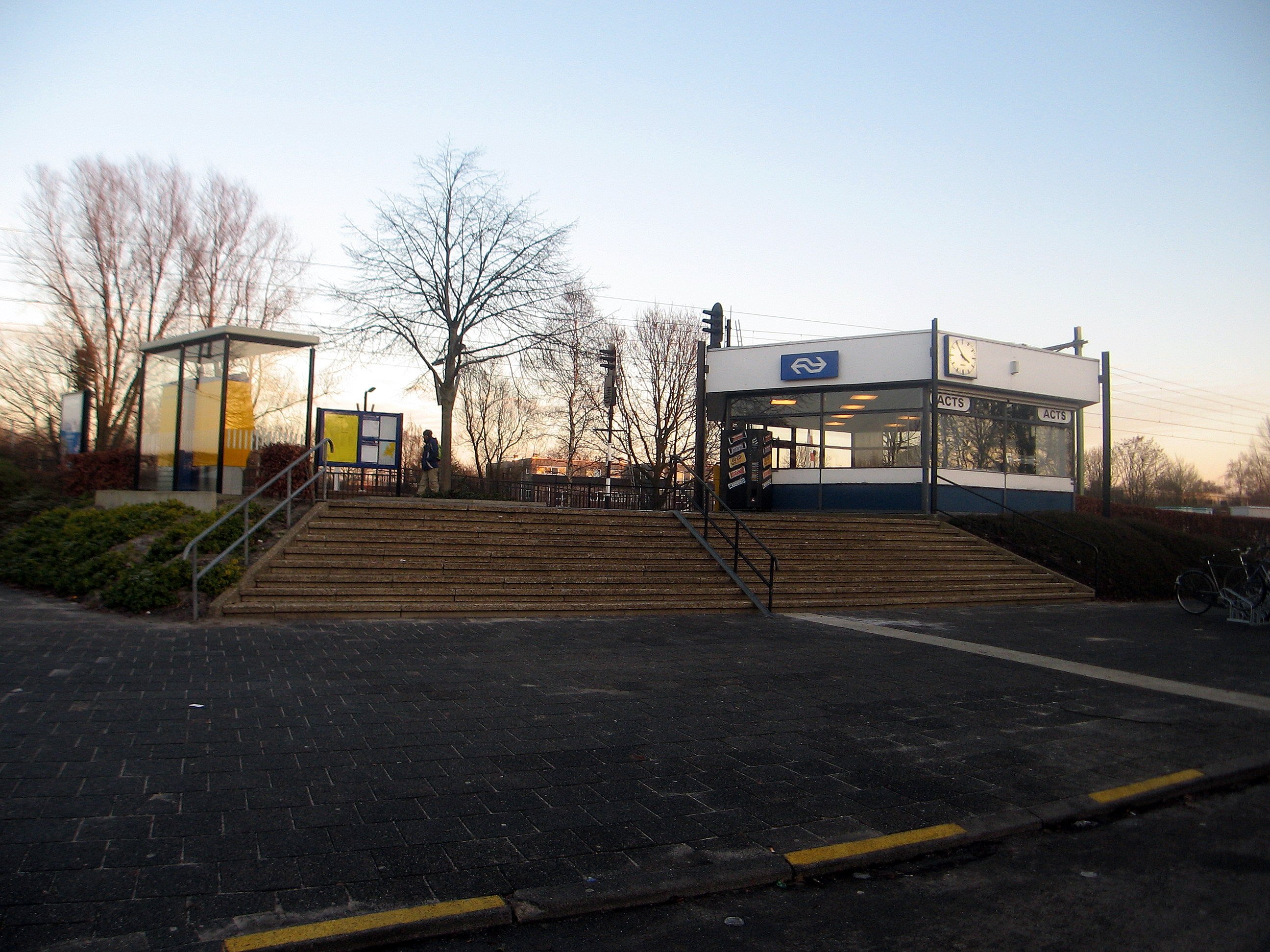
- Haren railway station in 2007

General information
- Location: Haren, Netherlands
- Coordinates: 53°10′30″N 6°37′04″E
- Line: Meppel–Groningen railway

History
- Opened: 29 September 1968

Services
Preceding station	Nederlandse Spoorwegen	Following station
Assen towards Zwolle	NS Sprinter 6100	Groningen Europapark towards Groningen
Location
- Location within Netherlands

Haren is a railway station located in Haren, Netherlands. The current station was opened on 29 September 1968 and is located on the Meppel–Groningen railway. Train services are operated by Nederlandse Spoorwegen.

A previous railway station serviced Haren between 1 May 1870, when the Meppel–Groningen railway line was opened, and 15 May 1936. The line was operated at the time by the Company for the Exploitation of the State Railways. The former station was closed because of its distance to the village. The new station, at a new location, was opened in 1968 after a new neighbourhood was built near the railway line.

== Train services ==
Route	Service type	Operator	Notes
Zwolle - Meppel - Groningen	Local ("Sprinter")	NS	2x per hour - On Sundays, this train operates 1x per hour until 16:00, then 2x per hour after
Groningen - Haren - Assen	Local ("Sprinter")	NS	2x per hour - rush hours only.

== Bus services ==
Line	Route	Operator	Notes
51	Groningen - Haren - Onnen - Noordlaren - Zuidlaren - Schuilingsoord - Annen - Gieten/Anloo - Gasteren - Loon - Assen	Qbuzz and CTS	No service between Onnen and Assen on evenings and weekends.
