= Beilen railway station =

Railway station in Beilen, Netherlands

Beilen
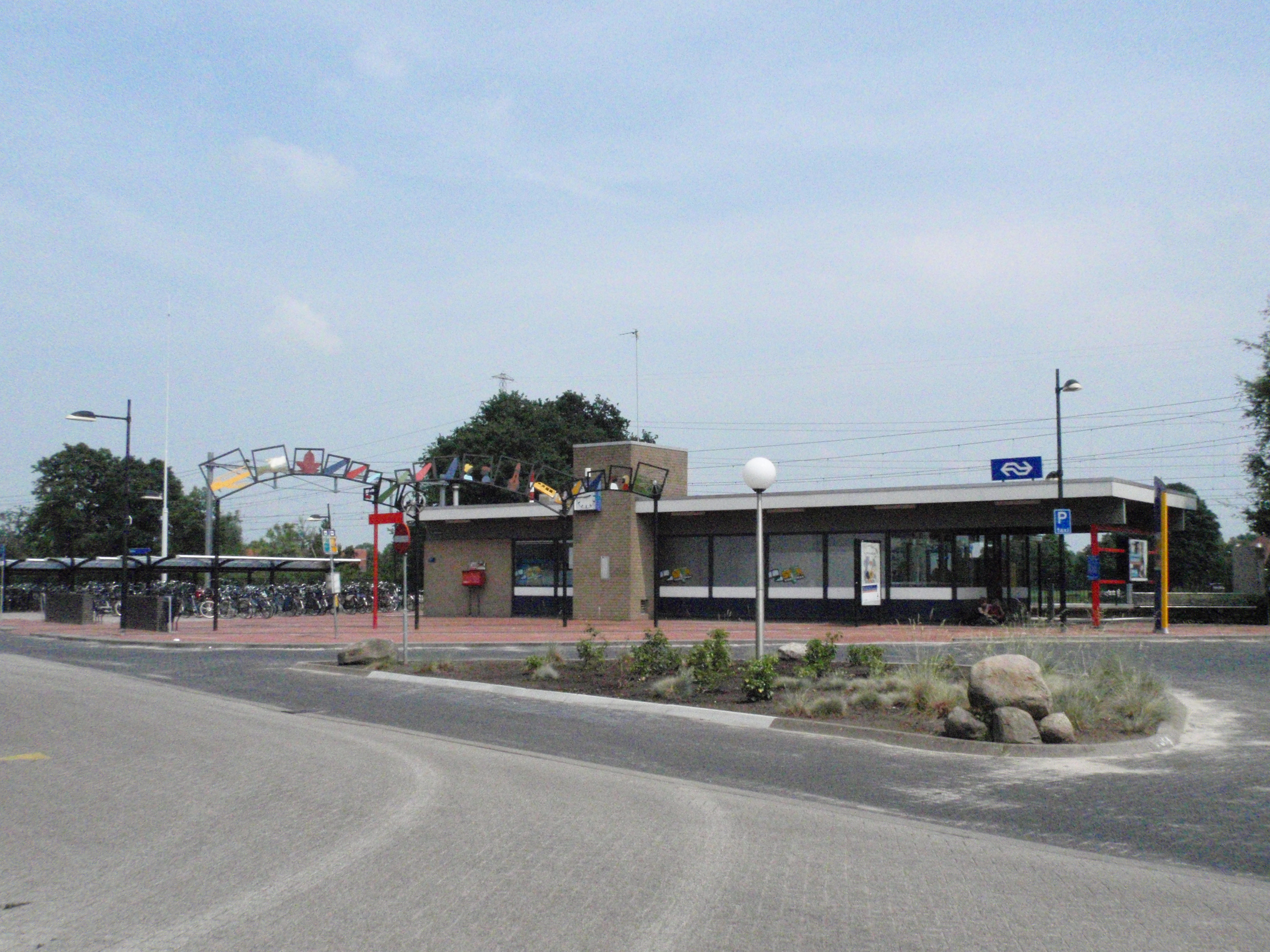

General information
- Location: Netherlands
- Coordinates: 52°51′17″N 6°31′15″E
- Line: Meppel–Groningen railway

History
- Opened: 1 May 1870 / 1 June 1940
- Closed: 15 May 1938

Services
| Preceding station | Nederlandse Spoorwegen | Following station |
|---|---|---|
| Hoogeveen towards Zwolle | NS Sprinter 6100 | Assen towards Groningen |
Location
- Location within Netherlands

Beilen is a railway station located in Beilen, Netherlands. The station was opened on 1 May 1870, closed on 15 May 1938 and reopened on 1 June 1940. The station is located on the Meppel–Groningen railway. The services are operated by Nederlandse Spoorwegen.

== Train services ==
| Route | Service type | Operator | Notes |
|---|---|---|---|
| Zwolle – Meppel – Groningen | Local ("Sprinters") | NS | 2x per hour – On Sundays, this train operates 1x per hour until 15:00, then 2x per hour after |

== Bus services ==
| Line | Route | Operator | Notes |
|---|---|---|---|
| 22 | Assen – Graswijk – Hooghalen – Beilen – Westerbork – Wezup – Zweeloo (- Emmen) | Qbuzz and CTS | The route between Zweeloo and Emmen is only served during rush hours (excluding school breaks). |
| 35 | Steenwijk – Frederiksoord – Vledder – Wapse – Diever – Dwingeloo – Lhee – Spier – Beilen | CTS | Mon-Fri during daytime hours only. |
| 520 | Beilen – Hijken – Oranje – Hoogersmilde | CTS | A few runs operate only between Beilen and Hijken. No service after 20:05 and on weekends. |

== See also ==
- List of railway stations in Drenthe
