= Groningen Europapark railway station =

Railway station in Groningen, Netherlands

Groningen Europapark
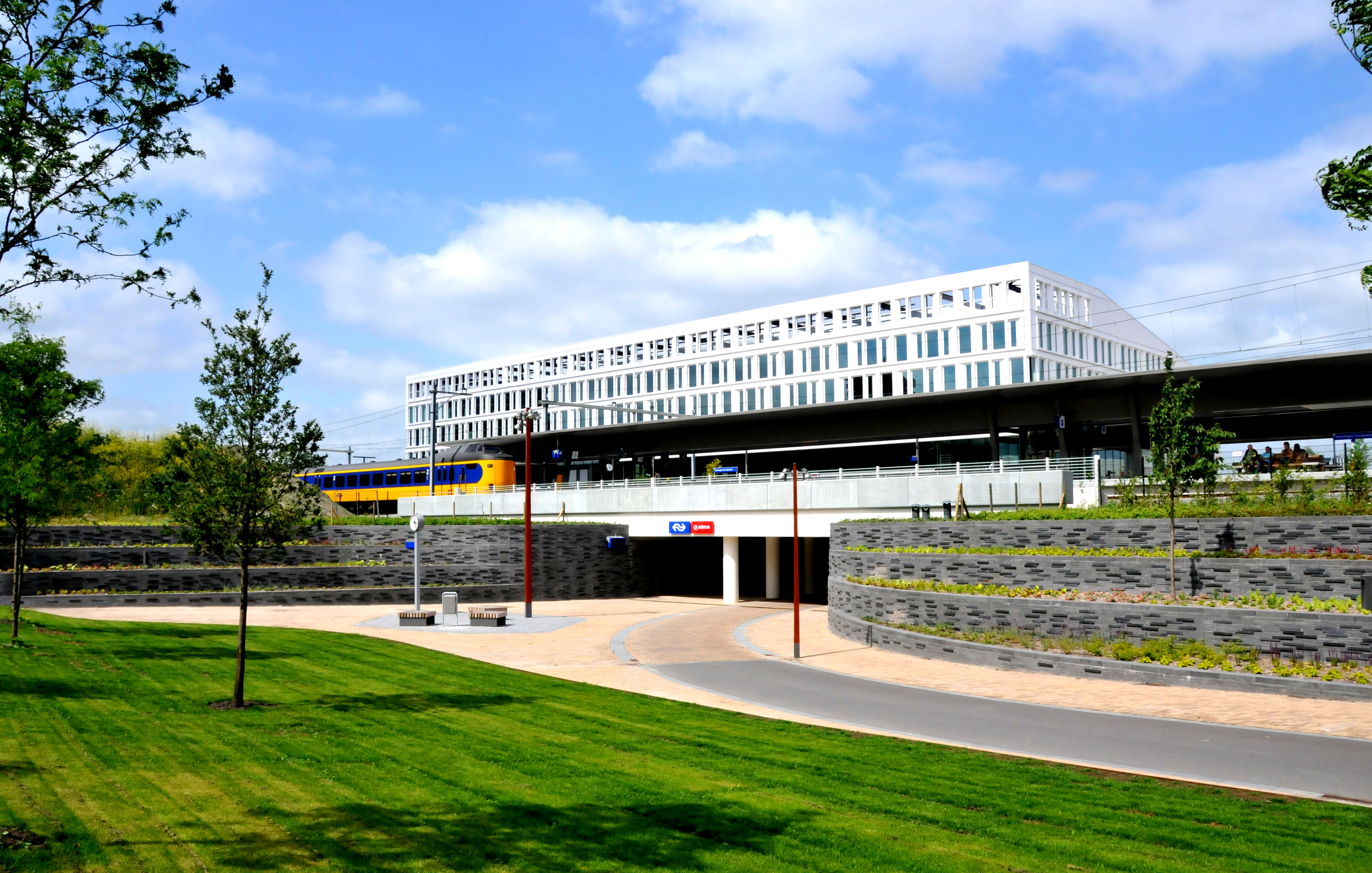
- Groningen Europapark railway station in 2013

General information
- Location: Verlengde Lodewijkstraat; Groningen, Netherlands
- Coordinates: 53°12′18″N 06°35′04″E
- Operator: NS Stations
- Lines: Harlingen–Nieuweschans railway Meppel–Groningen railway
- Platforms: 4
- Tracks: 4
- Train operators: Arriva; Nederlandse Spoorwegen

Construction
- Architect: Nienke van de Lune, Peter Heideman

Other information
- Station code: Gerp

History
- Opened: 1 October 2007
- Rebuilt: 10 December 2012

Services
Preceding station	Arriva Netherlands	Following station
Groningen Terminus	Stoptrein 20100	Kropswolde towards Leer
Groningen Terminus	Stoptrein 37500	Kropswolde towards Bad Nieuweschans
Groningen Terminus	Stoptrein 37800	Kropswolde towards Veendam
Preceding station	Nederlandse Spoorwegen	Following station
Haren towards Zwolle	NS Sprinter 6100	Groningen Terminus
Haren towards Assen	NS Sprinter 6200 Mon-Thurs Peak Hours	Groningen Terminus
Location
- Location within Netherlands

Groningen Europapark (Dutch pronunciation: [ˈɣroːnɪŋən øːˈroːpaːˌpɑr(ə)k, -ŋə ʔøː-]; abbreviation: Gerp) is an unstaffed railway station in Groningen in the Netherlands. It is situated on the Harlingen–Nieuweschans railway between Groningen and Kropswolde and on the Meppel–Groningen railway between Haren and Groningen. It was opened in 2007 and rebuilt in 2012. Local train services are operated by Arriva and Nederlandse Spoorwegen.

== Location ==
The station is located at 53°12′18″N 06°35′04″E in the neighbourhood of Europapark, part of the city of Groningen, in the province of Groningen in the northeast of the Netherlands. It is near the Euroborg football stadium.

The station is situated on the Harlingen–Nieuweschans railway between the railway stations of Groningen and Kropswolde, and on the Meppel–Groningen railway between the railway stations of Haren and Groningen.

== History ==
The part of the Harlingen–Nieuweschans railway between Groningen and Nieuweschans was opened in 1868 and the Meppel–Groningen railway was opened in 1870. Groningen Europapark was opened with a temporary station on 1 October 2007. Since the opening, train services on the Harlingen–Nieuweschans railway are provided by Arriva and on the Meppel–Groningen railway by the Nederlandse Spoorwegen. A new permanent station was opened on 10 December 2012.

== Building ==
The station was designed by Nienke van de Lune and Peter Heideman.

== Train services ==
Route	Service type	Operator	Notes
Zwolle - Meppel - Groningen	Local ("Sprinter")	NS	2x per hour - On Sundays, this train operates 1x per hour until 16:00, then 2x per hour after
Groningen - Haren - Assen	Local ("Sprinter")	NS	2x per hour - rush hours only.
Groningen - Hoogezand-Sappemeer - Zuidbroek - Veendam	Local ("Stoptrein")	Arriva	2x per hour - 1x per hour on evenings and Sundays.
Groningen - Hoogezand-Sappemeer - Zuidbroek - Winschoten - Bad Nieuweschans - Leer (Germany)	Local ("Stoptrein")	Arriva	1x per hour
Groningen - Hoogezand-Sappemeer - Zuidbroek - Winschoten (- Bad Nieuweschans)	Local ("Stoptrein")	Arriva	1x per hour - 1x per 2 hours on Sundays. During morning rush hour and on evenings, a couple of runs run through to Bad Nieuweschans.

== Bus services ==
Line	Route	Operator	Notes
2	Groningen Europapark - UMCG - Station Noord - Paddepoel - Zernike - P+R Reitdiep	Qbuzz	No service after 21:30 (weekdays), 19:30 (Saturdays) and on Sundays.
12	Groningen Hoofdstation (main station) - Europapark - Euvelgunne - Eemspoort - P+R Meerstad - P+R Kardinge	Qbuzz	Rush hours only, with a few extra runs between 14:00 and the start of the afternoon rush hour.
28	Groningen Hoofdstation (main station) - Centrum (Downtown) - UMCG - Noordlease Stadion (stadium)	Qbuzz	Only operates on Saturday evenings during match games in the stadium. This bus is free-to-use after showing the match ticket to the bus operator.
174	(Groningen - Westerbroek - Hoogezand - Sappemeer -) Zuidbroek - Muntendam - Veendam	Qbuzz and Taxi De Grooth	The route between Groningen and Zuidbroek is only served during rush hours. No service after 22:50 (weekdays), on Saturday evenings (entirely), Sunday mornings and after 22:20 (Sunday evenings).
