= Hoogeveen railway station =

Railway station in Hoogeveen, Netherlands

Hoogeveen
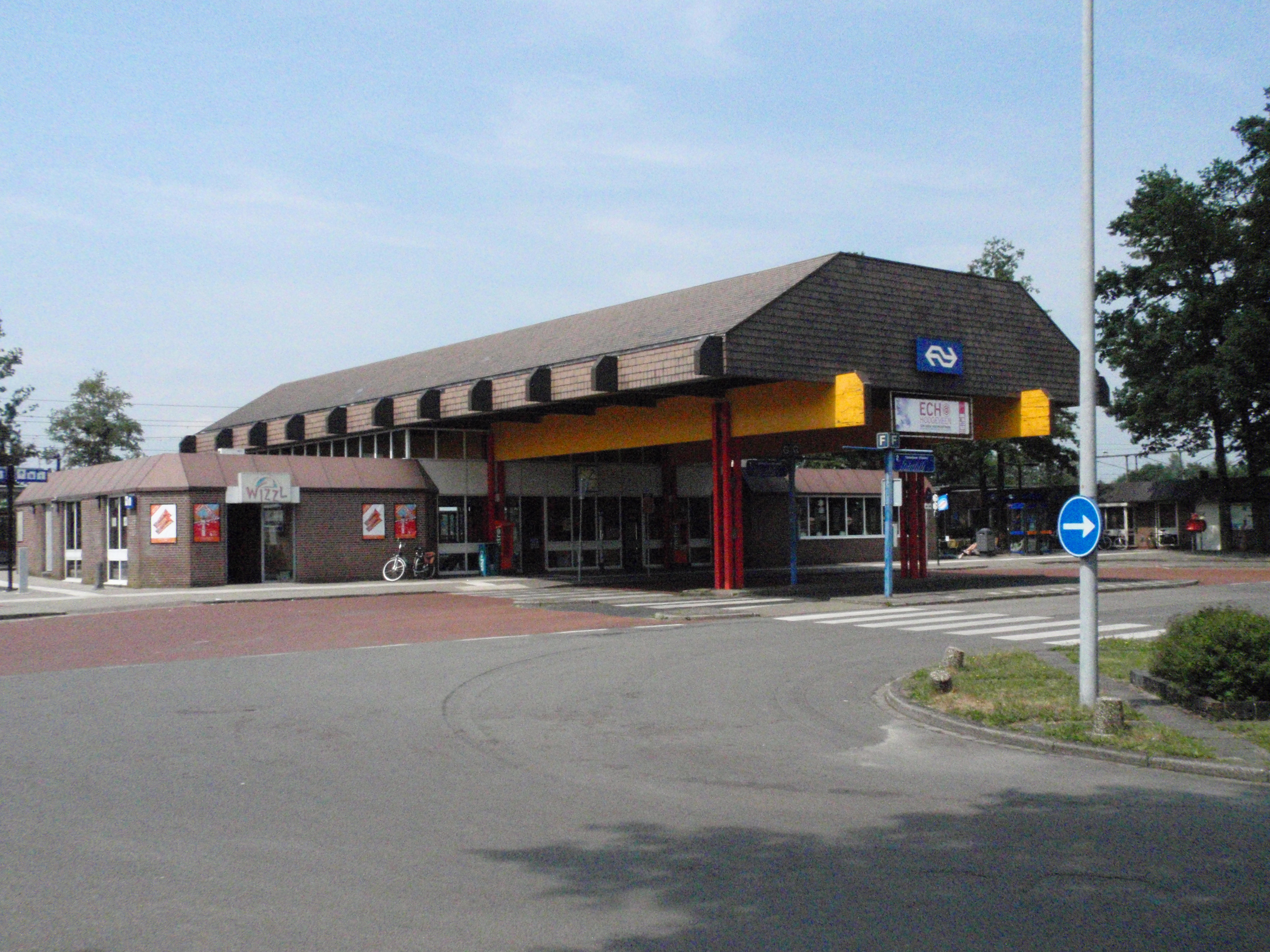

General information
- Location: Netherlands
- Coordinates: 52°44′00″N 6°28′21″E
- Line: Meppel–Groningen railway

History
- Opened: 1 May 1870

Services
Preceding station	Nederlandse Spoorwegen	Following station
Meppel towards Zwolle	NS Sprinter 6100	Beilen towards Groningen
Location
- Location within Netherlands

Hoogeveen is a railway station located in Hoogeveen, Netherlands. The station was opened on 1 May 1870 and is located on the Meppel–Groningen railway. Train services are operated by Nederlandse Spoorwegen.

== Train services ==
Route	Service type	Operator	Notes
Zwolle - Meppel - Groningen	Local ("Sprinters")	NS	2x per hour - On Sundays, this train operates 1x per hour until 15:00, then 2x per hour after

== Bus services ==
Line	Route	Operator	Notes
	Hoogeveen Station - Centrum (town centre) - Venesluis - Zuid - Wolfsbos	Taxi Dorenbos	No service on evenings.
	Hoogeveen Station - Centrum (town centre) - Oost - Bentinckspark - Krakeel	Taxi Dorenbos	No service on evenings.
	Hoogeveen Station - Centrum (town centre) - West - Grittenhof - Schutlanden - Schoonvelde	Taxi Dorenbos	No service on evenings.
27	Hoogeveen - Noordscheschut - Geesbrug - Zwinderen - Gees - Oosterhesselen - Meppen - Aalden - Zweeloo - Emmen	Qbuzz	
30	Hardenberg - Heemserveen - Lutten - Slagharen - Kerkenveld - Zuideropgaande - Hollandscheveld - Hoogeveen	Syntus Overijssel	No service on evenings during weekends.
31	Ommen - Witharen - Balkbrug - Linde - Zuidwolde - Ter Arlo - Hoogeveen	Qbuzz	On evenings and Sundays, this bus only operates between Zuidwolde and Hoogeveen.
32	Meppel - Ruinerwold - Oosteinde - Ruinen - Pesse - Hoogeveen	Qbuzz	No service after 21:55. On Sundays, this bus only operates 1x per 2 hours during the afternoon and early evening.
33	Hoogeveen - Noordscheschut - Hollandscheveld - Elim - Nieuwlande - Dalerpeel - Steenwijksmoer - Coevorden	Drenthe Tours	Mon-Fri during daytime hours only.
36	Hoogeveen - Tiendeveen - Drijber - Wijster - Spier	Taxi Dorenbos	2 runs during morning rush hour and 2 during afternoon rush hour, with 2 extra runs somewhere in between rush hours.
37	Hoogeveen - Noordscheschut - Nieuweroord - Nieuw Balinge - Mantinge - Balinge - Garminge - Westerbork	Taxi Dorenbos	1x per 45 min during morning rush hour and 1x per 1,5 hours during afternoon rush hour, with 2 extra runs somewhere in between rush hours.
131	Hoogeveen - Ter Arlo - Zuidwolde - Linde - Balkbrug	Qbuzz	Rush hours only.
674	Kampen GSG Pieter Zandt - Hasselt - Lichtmis - Rouveen - Staphorst Redder // Kampen GSG Pieter Zandt - Hollandscheveld - Noordscheschut - Hoogeveen	Gebo Tours	Rush hours only. 1 run to/from Staphorst and 1 run to/from Hoogeveen during both rush hours.

== See also ==
- List of railway stations in Drenthe
