= Meppel–Groningen railway =

Railway line in the Netherlands

Overview
- Status: Operational
- Locale: The Netherlands
- Termini: Meppel railway station; Groningen railway station

Service
- Operator(s): Nederlandse Spoorwegen

History
- Opened: 1870

Technical
- Line length: 77 km (48 mi)
- Number of tracks: double track
- Track gauge: 1,435 mm (4 ft 8 1/2 in) standard gauge
- Electrification: 1.5 kV DC

The Meppel–Groningen railway is an important railway line in the Netherlands running from Meppel to Groningen, passing through Hoogeveen, Beilen and Assen. The line was opened in 1870. It is also known as the Staatslijn "C".

== Stations ==
The main interchange stations on the Meppel–Groningen railway are:

- Meppel: to Utrecht, Zwolle and Leeuwarden
- Groningen: to Leeuwarden, Delfzijl and Nieuweschans

== History ==
The Westerbork transit camp, where Dutch Jews and others were held before deportation to Nazi concentration camps in the East, had its own branch line from the Meppel–Groningen railway, branching off at the former Hooghalen railway station. In the 1970s, the railway was the scene of two train hijackings by South-Moluccans: in 1975 at Wijster, and in 1977 at De Punt.

Gallery

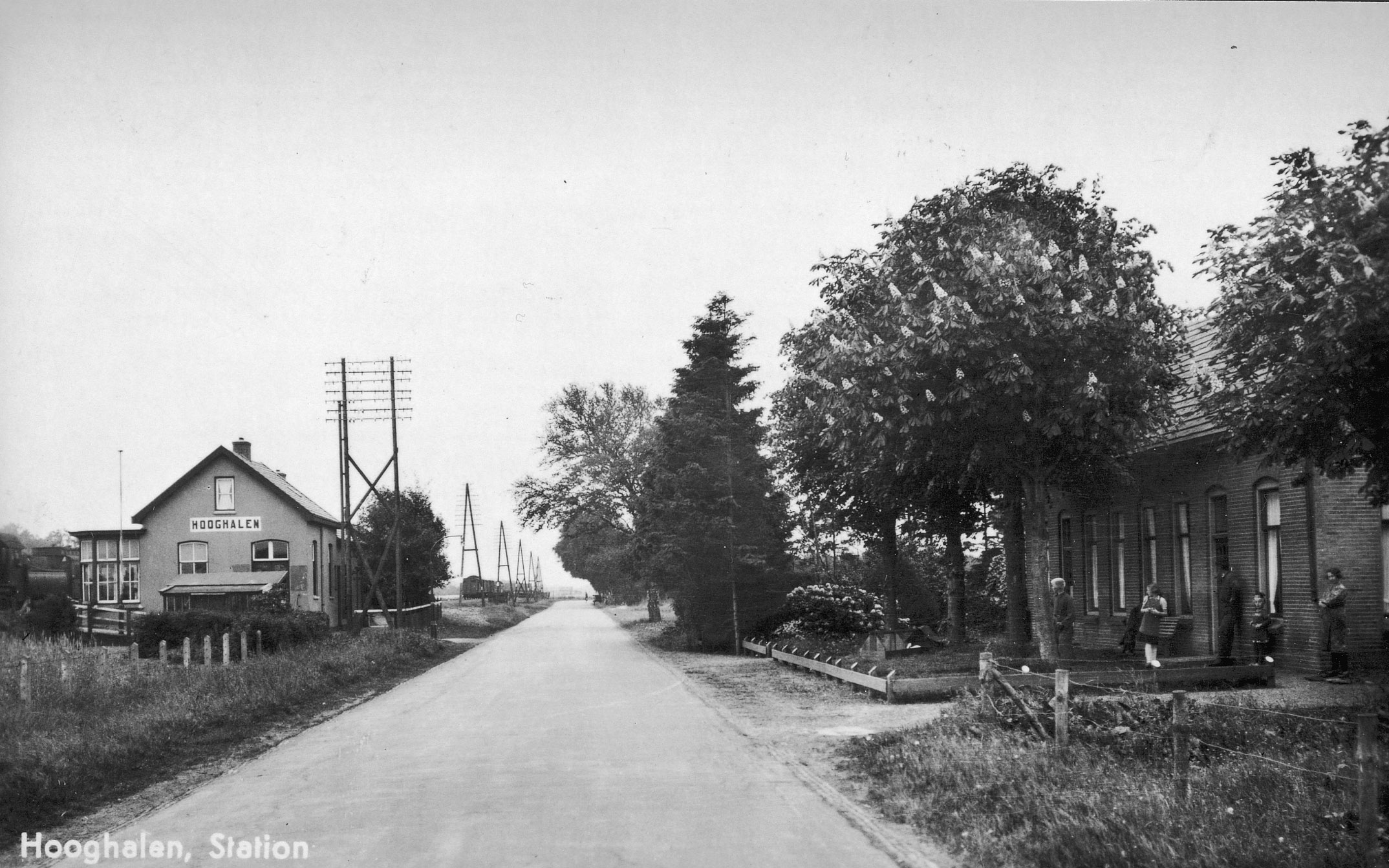
Hooghalen railway station before 1938

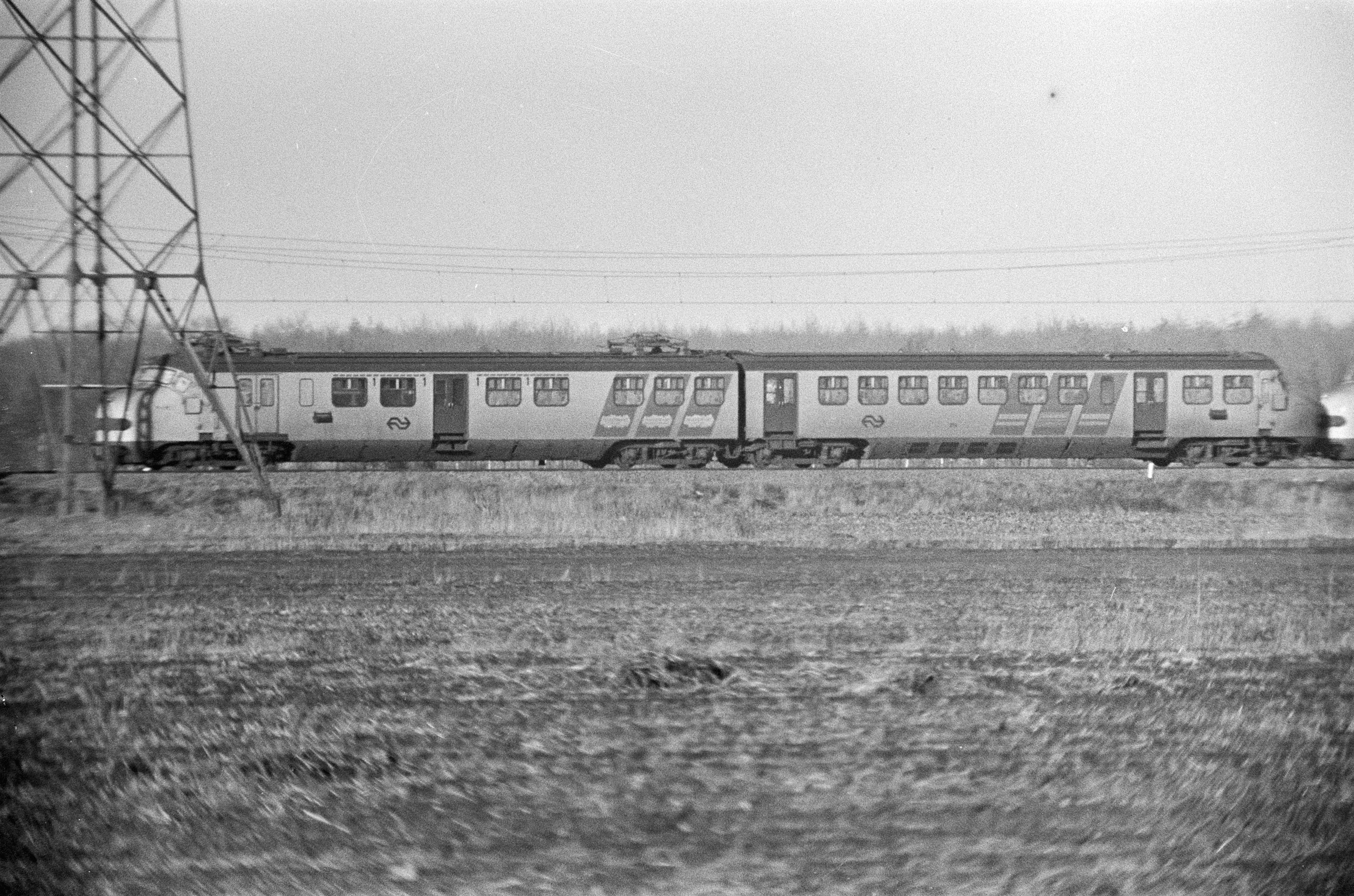
Hijacking at Wijster (1975)

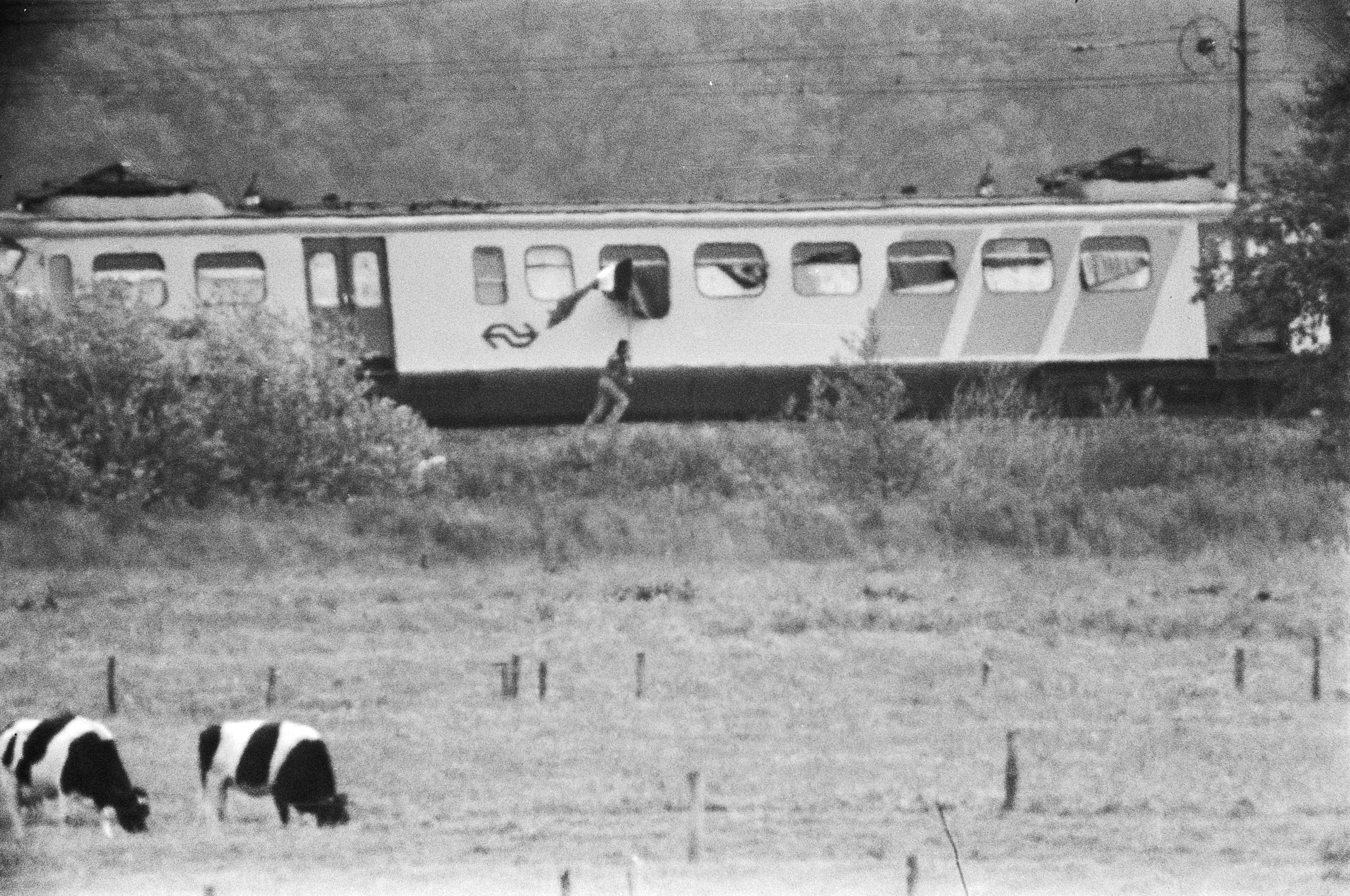
Hijacking at De Punt (1977)
