= Strubben–Kniphorstbos =

Reserve in Drenthe, the Netherlands

Coordinates: 53.0618°N 6.6861°E

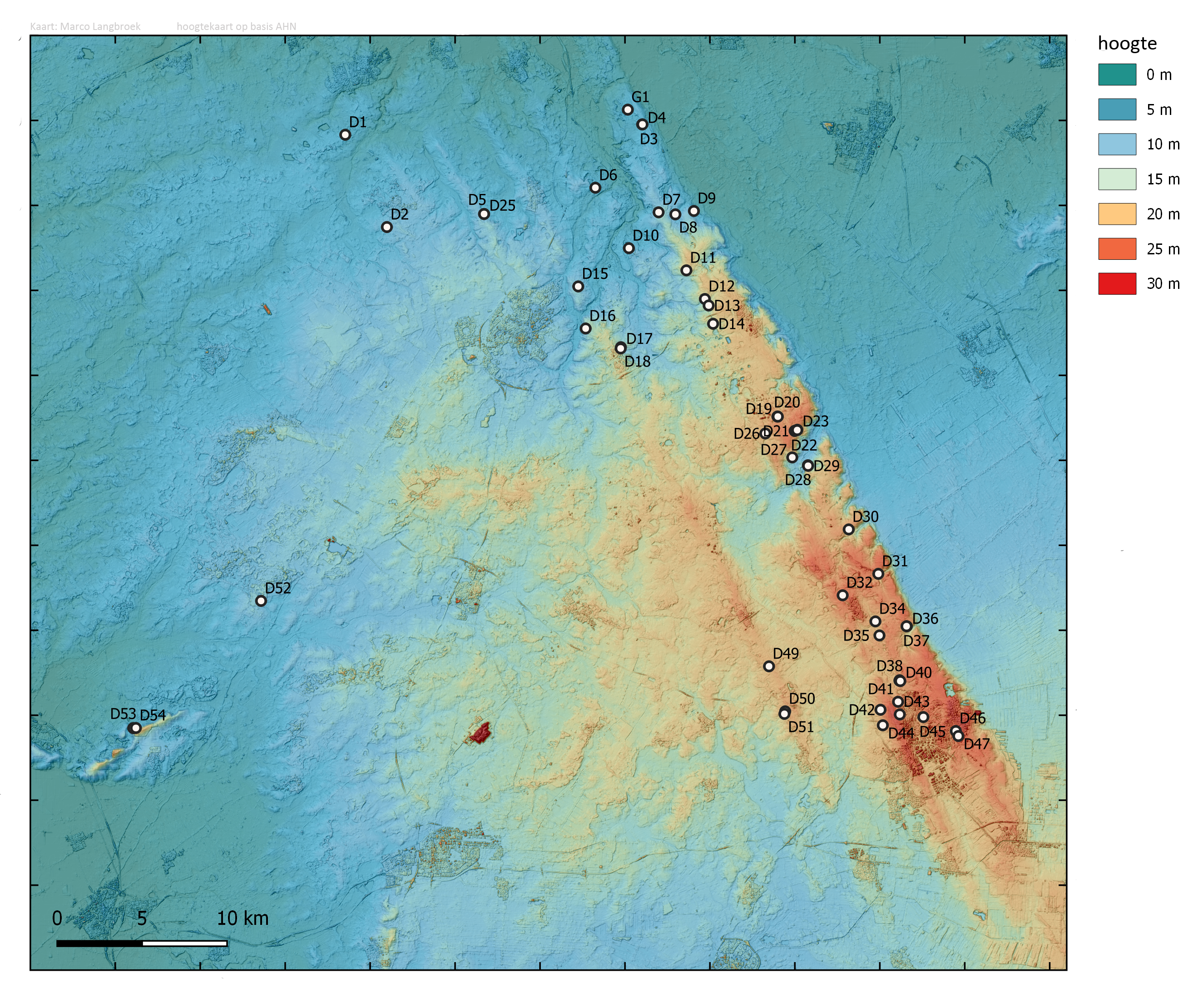
Relief map of Drenthe Province with the distribution of hunebedden (dolmens)

The Strubben–Kniphorstbos is a nature reserve of 377 hectares, located between Anloo and Schipborg in the Dutch province of Drenthe. It is the only archaeological reserve in the Netherlands.

The park's composite name is derived from the 'stubby' oaks in the area, and by Gerrit Kniphorst, who was in the 19th century the owner of the then heathlands. Beginning in 1938, the site was for the most part of the 20th century used as a military training ground.

== Reserve ==
In 2006 the area was placed under the administration of Staatsbosbeheer and designated as an archaeological national monument. The layout of the forest was then managed according to the landscape approach, taking into account the historical land use in different periods. As a nature reserve, the reserve partly falls under the Drentsche Aa area, a Natura 2000 area.

The province of Drenthe is rich in archaeological remains of the funnelbeaker culture, with 54 extant dolmens, of which two (D7 and D8) are within the boundaries of the reserve. It also houses some sixty burial mounds.

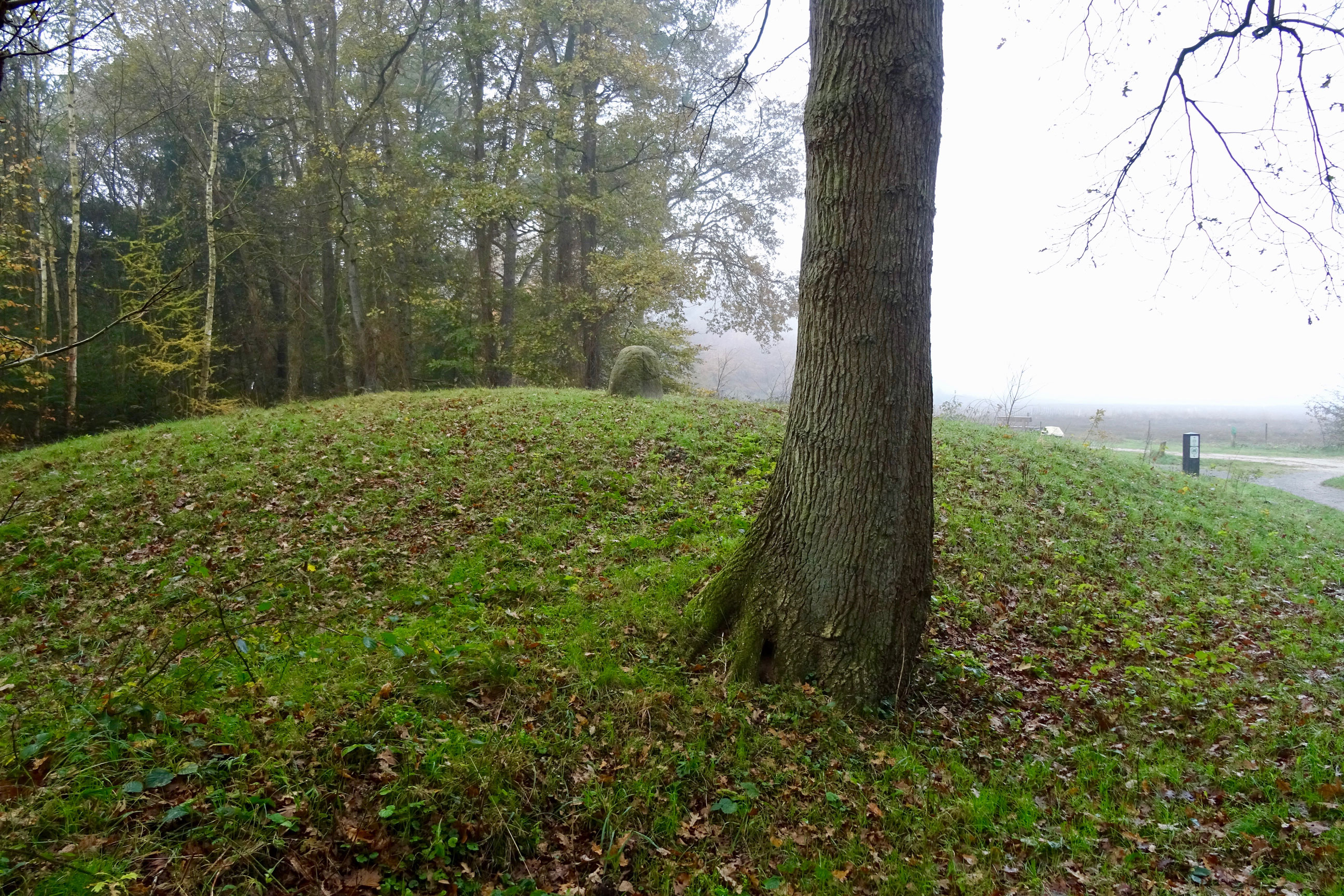
One of the burial mounds in the area

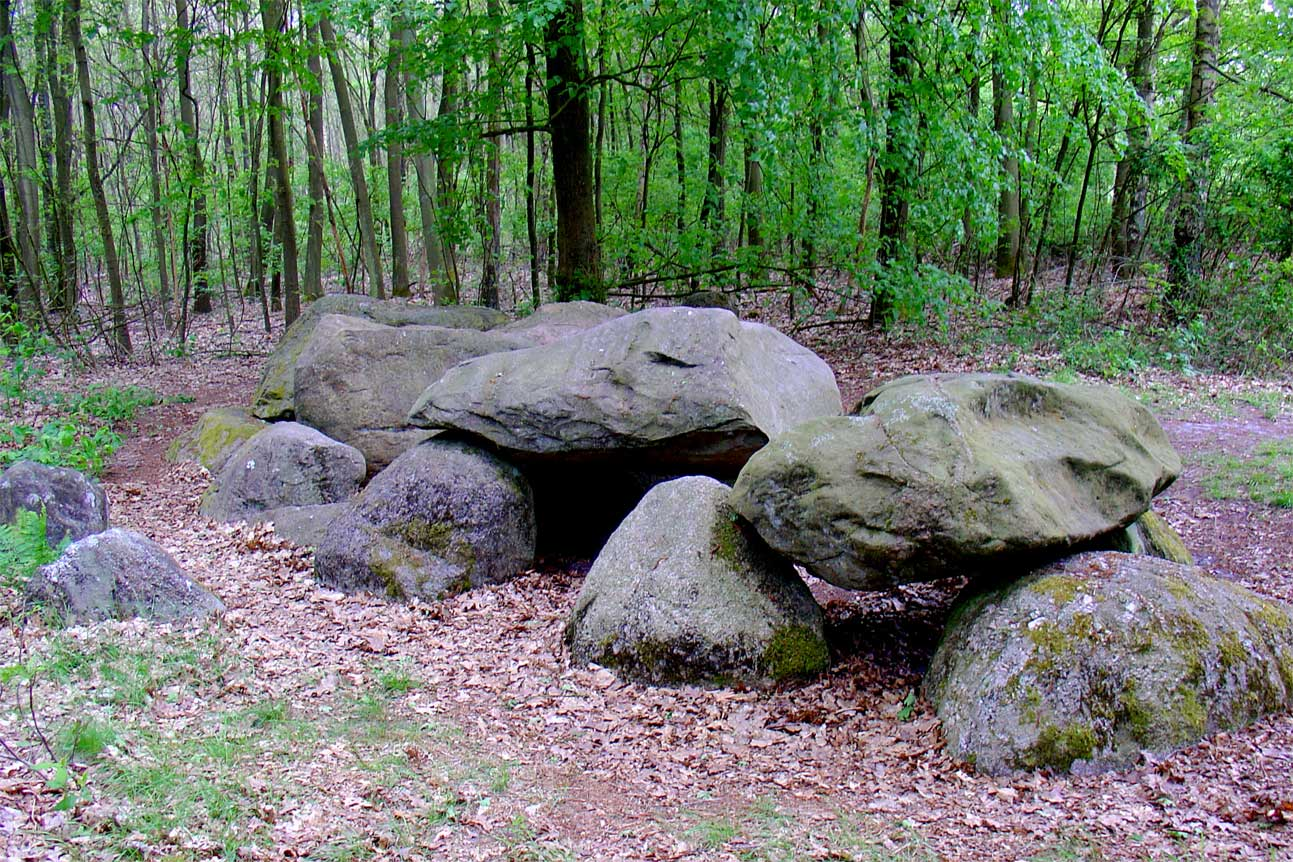
Dolmen D7

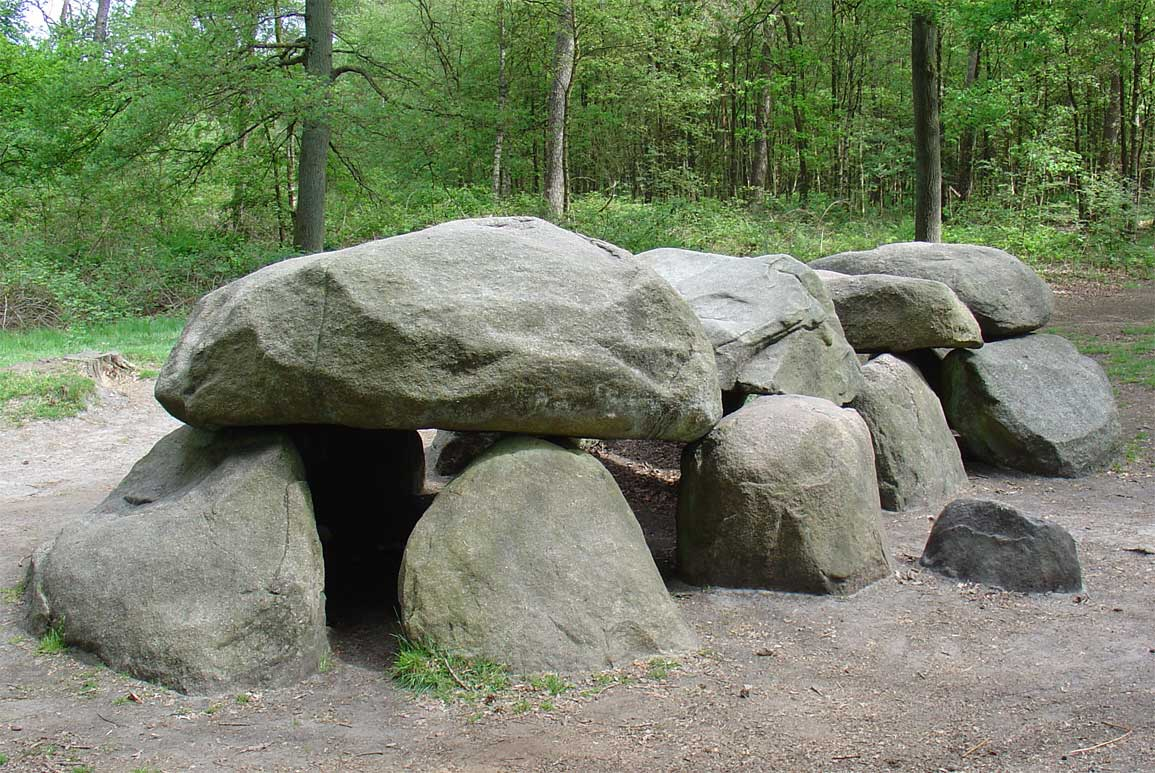
Dolmen D8

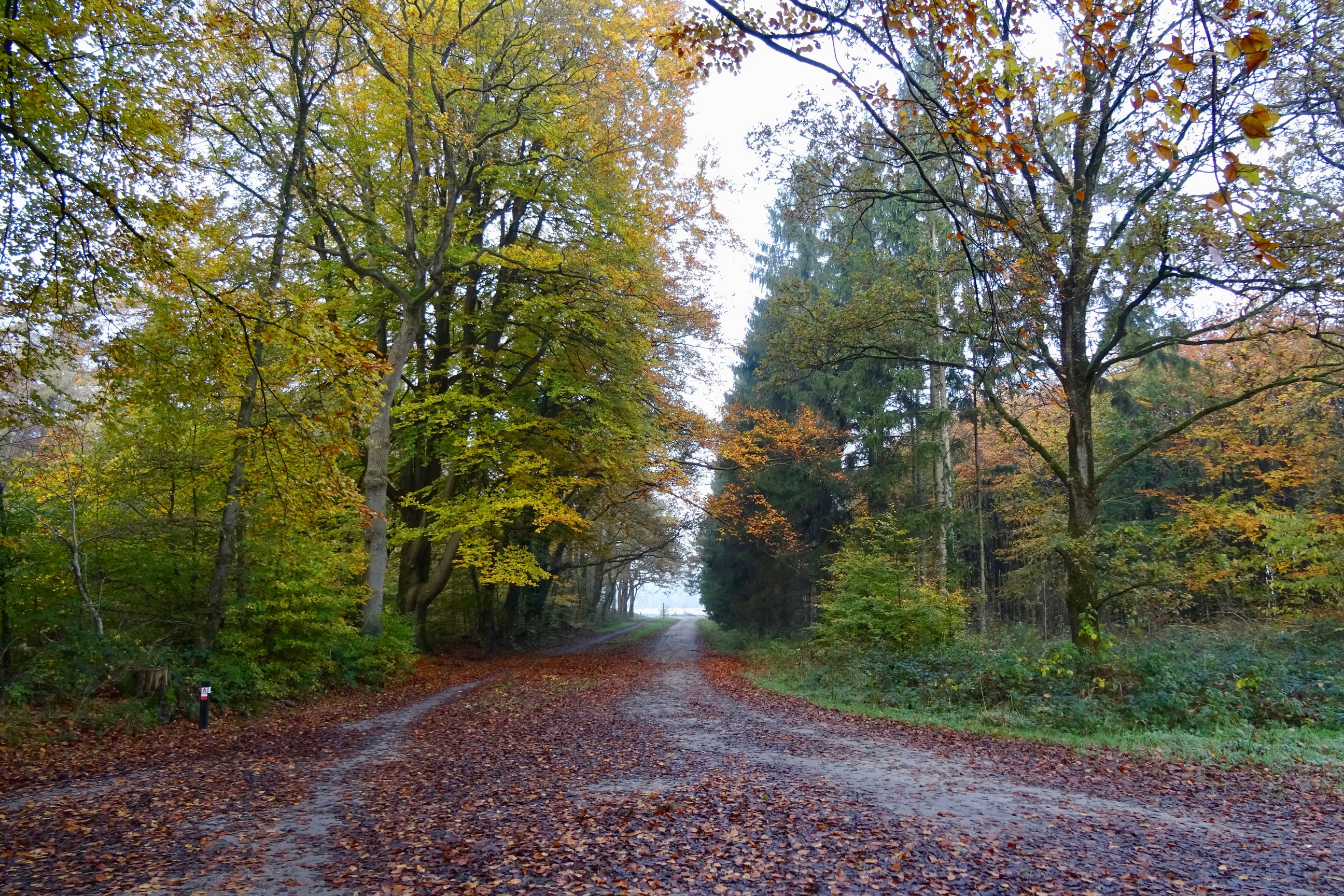
Forest road
