= Drenthe (disambiguation) =

Drenthe is a province of the Netherlands.

Drenthe may also refer to:

- Drenthe, Michigan, an unincorporated community in Zeeland Charter Township, Michigan
- Royston Drenthe (born 1987), Dutch footballer
- Drenthe University of Applied Sciences, a former Dutch university of applied sciences
- HNLMS Drenthe (D816), a destroyer of the Dutch navy
- A stage in the Saalian glaciation
