= Annen =

- Village
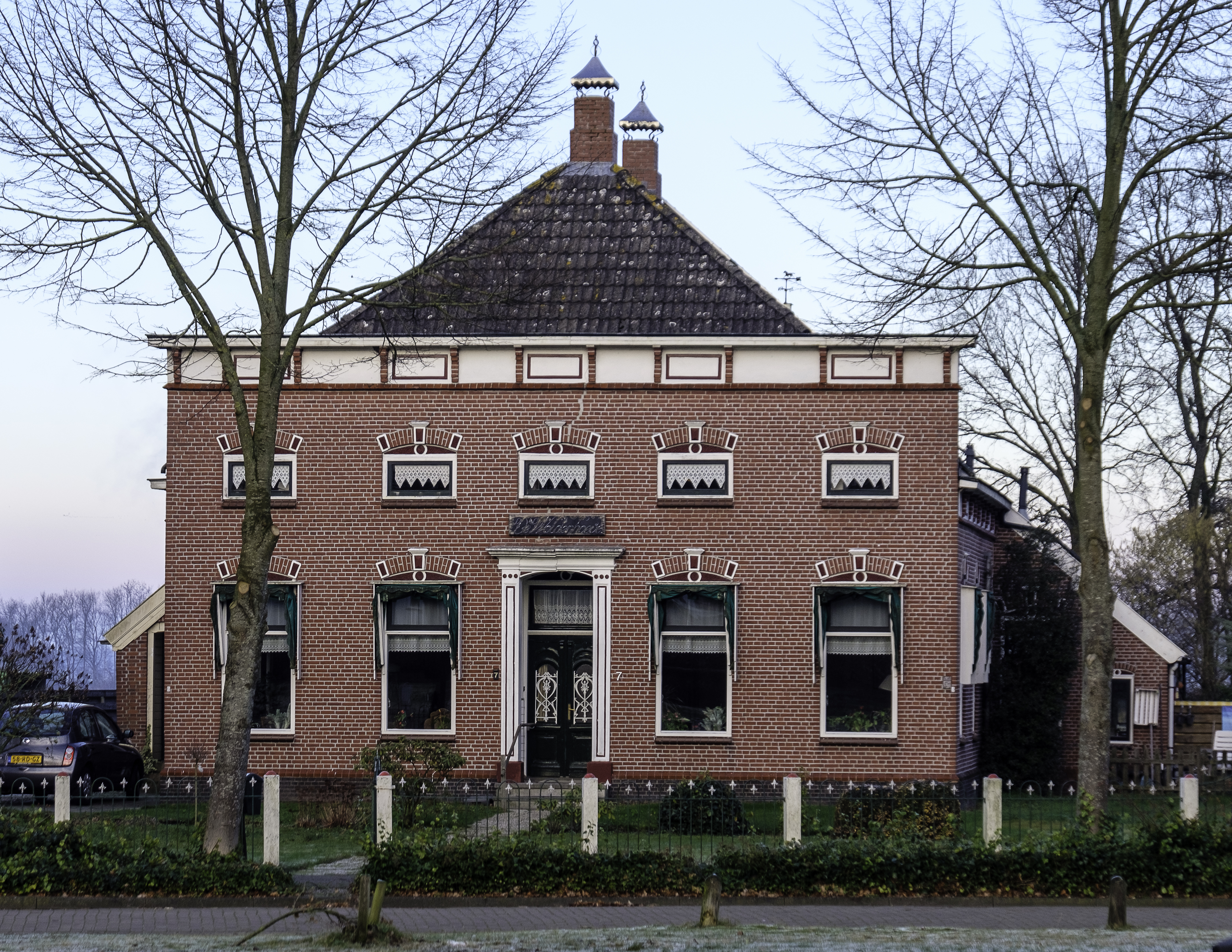
- De Wolden

- Flag

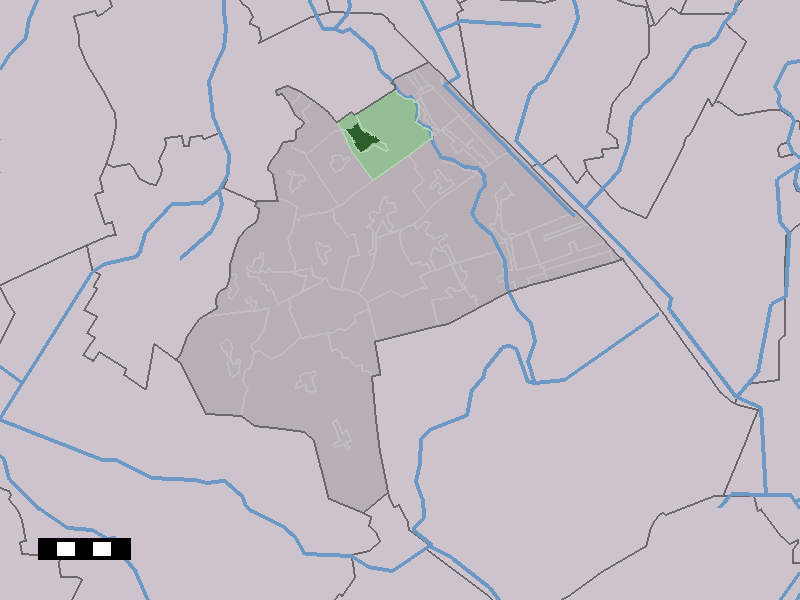
- The village centre (dark green) and the statistical district (light green) of Annen in the municipality of Aa en Hunze.

- Location in the Netherlands Annen (Netherlands)
- Coordinates: 53°3′31″N 6°43′6″E
- Country: Netherlands
- Province: Drenthe
- Municipality: Aa en Hunze

Area
  - Total: 14.78 km^{2} (5.71 sq mi)
- Elevation: 8 m (26 ft)

Population (2021)
  - Total: 3,595
  - Density: 243.2/km^{2} (630.0/sq mi)
- Time zone: UTC+1 (CET)
  - Summer (DST): UTC+2 (CEST)
- Postal code: 9468
- Dialing code: 0592

Annen is a village in the Dutch province of Drenthe. Located in the municipality of Aa en Hunze, it lies about 12 km (7.4 mi) northeast of Assen.

== History ==
The village was first mentioned in 1309 as Anne. The etymology is unknown. Annen is an esdorp without a church which developed in the Early Middle Ages on the Hondsrug. It was a large triangular brink (village square) in the south-western corner of the village.

The town hall of the municipality of Anloo used to be located in Annen. It is a wide neoclassic building from 1895 which also contained the residential home of the mayor.

Annen was home to 419 people in 1840. The Reformed Church was built in 1954. It was decommissioned in 1980, and now serves as village house and is used by the local veterinarian. It was an independent municipality until 1998 when it was merged into Aa en Hunze.

== Transportation ==
The nearest railway station is Assen station. The following bus services stop in Annen: 58, 59, 93 and 318.

== Gallery ==
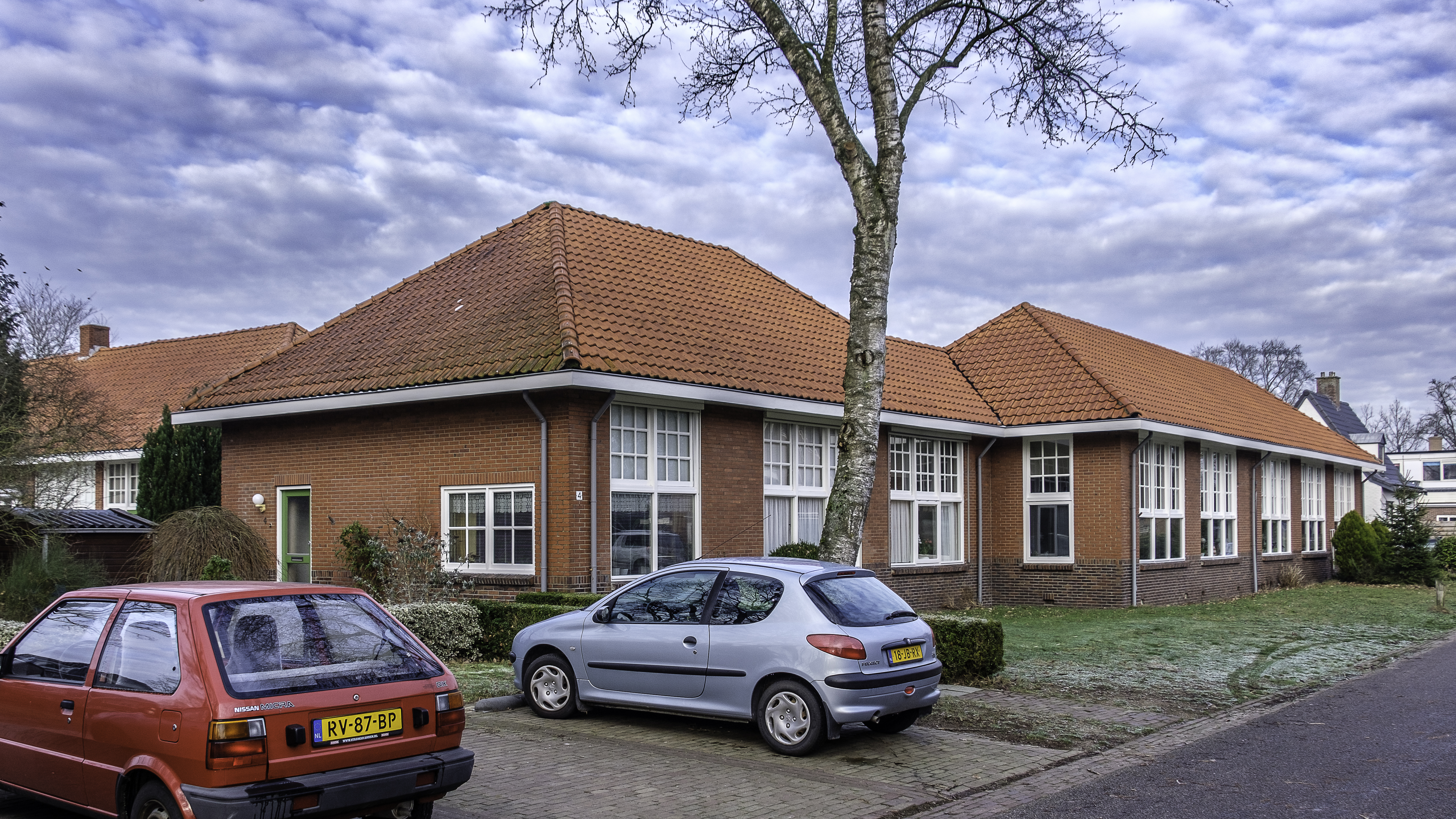
Former school

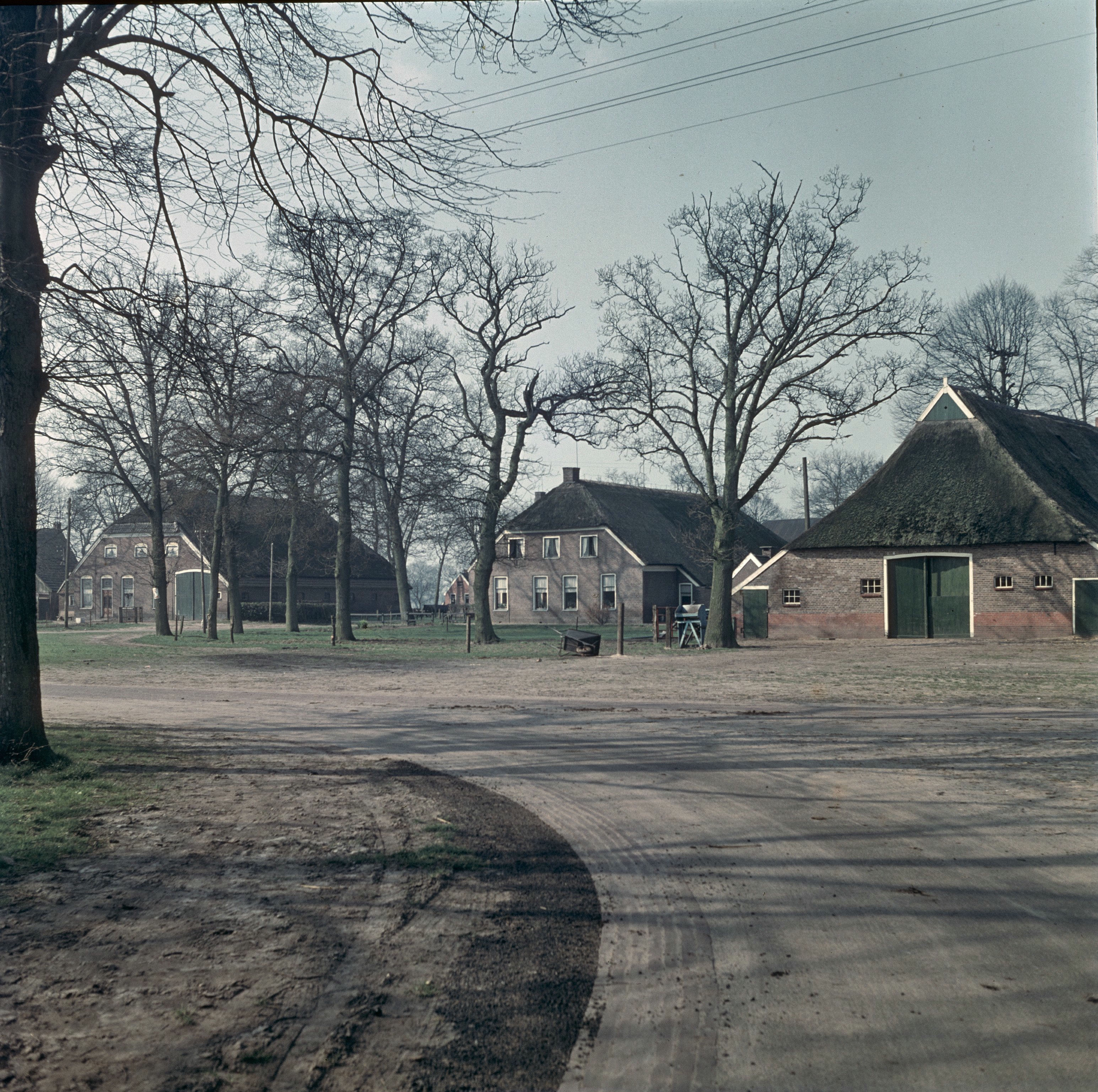
Farms in Annen
