= Harm Brouwer =

Dutch politician (born 1957)

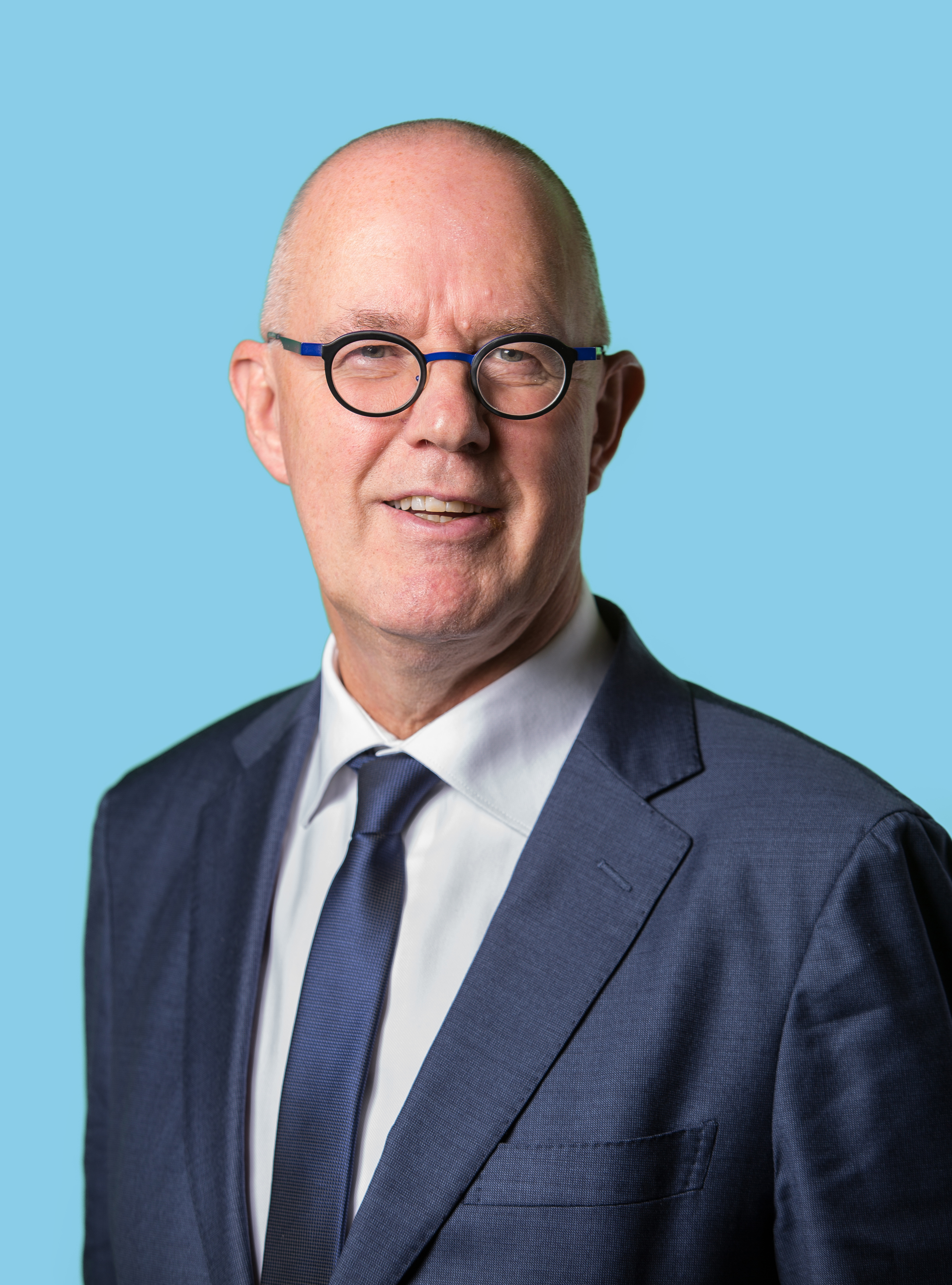
- Brouwer in 2010

Member of the House of Representatives
- In office 6 July 2016 – 23 March 2017
- In office 1 March 2016 – 10 June 2016
- In office 5 November 2015 – 12 January 2016

Personal details
- Born: 4 April 1957 (age 68); Anloo, Netherlands
- Political party: Labour Party

Harm Brouwer (born 4 April 1957) is a Dutch politician who was a member of the House of Representatives for the Labour Party between 6 July 2016 and 23 March 2017. He previously served twice as a temporary member of the House, most recently from 1 March 2016 to 10 June 2016, when he replaced Lea Bouwmeester while she was pregnant and on maternity leave. Before that, he replaced Manon Fokke from 5 November 2015 to 12 January 2016, when she was pregnant and on maternity leave, after she had previously been temporarily replaced by Joyce Vermue.

== Career ==
Brouwer was born on 4 April 1957 in Anloo. He worked for seven years at the Federatie Nederlandse Vakbeweging where he was head of the Northern provinces of Groningen, Friesland and Drenthe. Brouwer also worked as social programme manager for the municipality of Groningen.

Brouwer was chairman of the region of Drenthe for the Labour Party between 2005 and 2015. In the parliamentary elections of 2012 Brouwer occupied number 49 on the Labour Party list and was not elected.

His term in the House ended on 23 March 2017.
