= List of provinces of the Netherlands by Human Development Index =

Map of the Netherlands by HDI in 2022. Legend: 0.960–0.970 0.940–0.950 0.930–0.940 0.920–0.930 0.910–0.920

This is a list of Dutch provinces by Human Development Index as of 2023.

Rank	Province	HDI (2023)
Very high human development
1	Utrecht	0.969
2	North Holland	0.964
3	North Brabant	0.955
–	Netherlands (average)	0.955
4	South Holland	0.954
5	Groningen	0.951
6	Gelderland	0.944
6	Limburg	0.944
7	Overijssel	0.942
8	Flevoland	0.933
9	Friesland	0.931
10	Zeeland	0.930
11	Drenthe	0.926
