= Manon Fokke =

Dutch politician (born 1976)

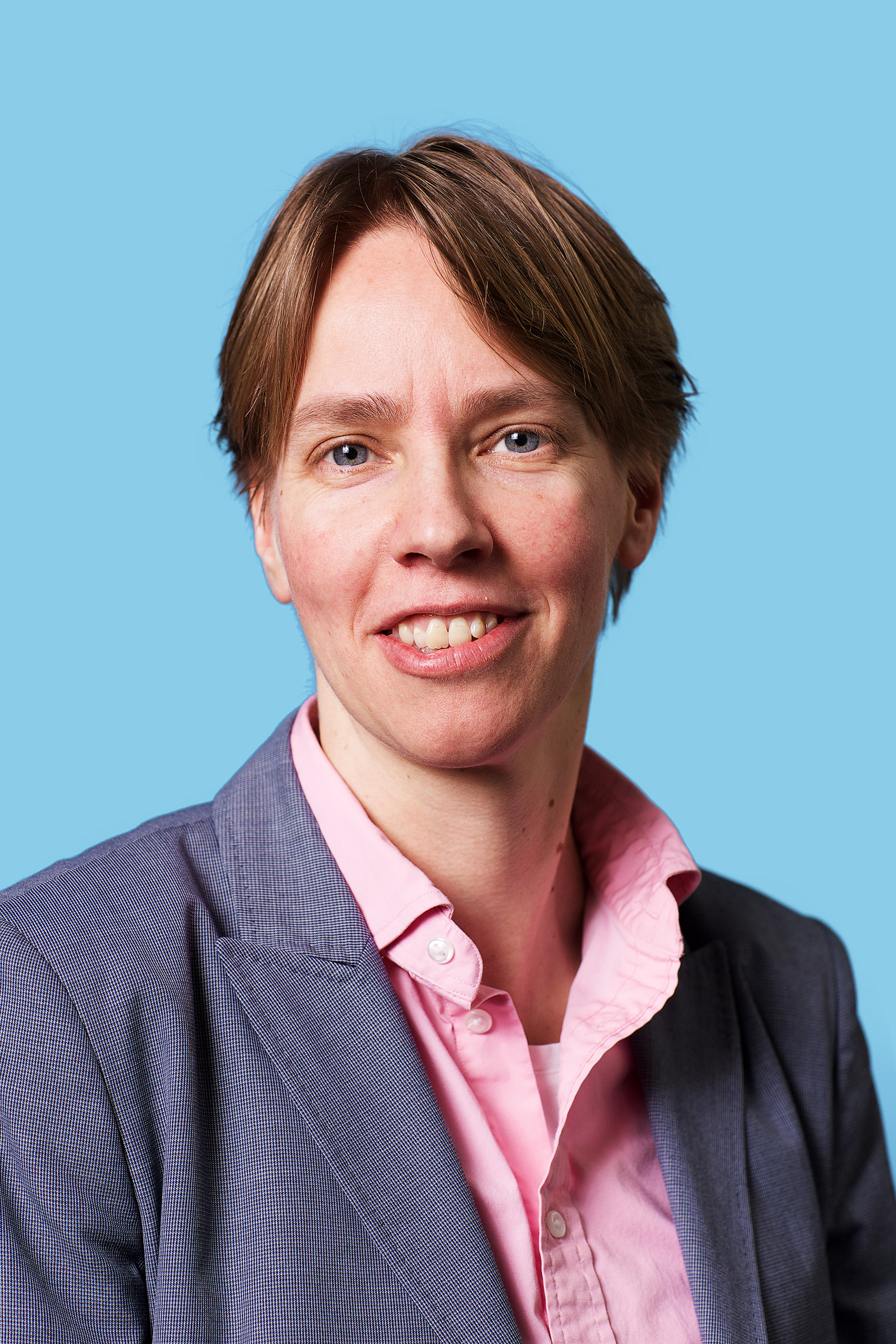
- Manon Fokke

Member of the House of Representatives
- In office 20 September 2012 – 23 March 2017

Personal details
- Born: 16 January 1976 (age 50) Vriezenveen
- Party: Labour Party
- Occupation: Politician

Hermanna (Manon) Fokke (born 16 January 1976 in Vriezenveen) is a Dutch politician. As a member of the Labour Party (Partij van de Arbeid) was an MP between 20 September 2012 and 23 March 2017. Previously she was a member of the municipal council of Maastricht from 2006 to 2012.

Fokke went on maternity leave in September 2015 and was temporarily replaced by first Joyce Vermue and later Harm Brouwer. She returned in the House on 12 January 2016.
