= Lea Bouwmeester =

Dutch politician (born 1979)

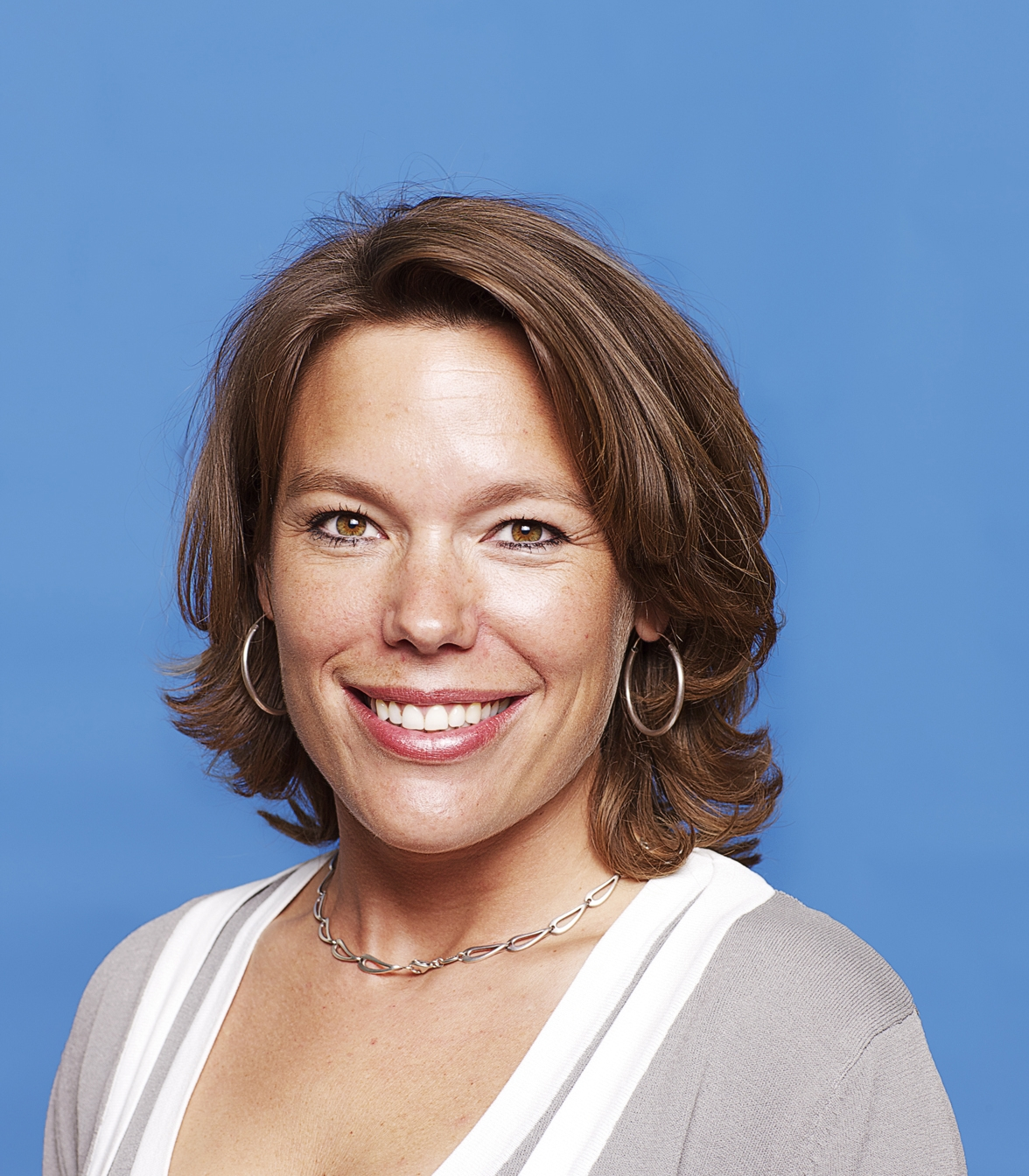
- Lea Bouwmeester

Member of the House of Representatives
- In office 30 November 2006 – 23 March 2017

Personal details
- Born: 3 October 1979 (age 46) Hoogeveen
- Party: Labour Party
- Occupation: Politician

Lea Theodora Bouwmeester (born 3 October 1979) is a Dutch politician and former civil servant and social counselor. She is a member of the Labour Party (Partij van de Arbeid) and was an MP between 30 November 2006 and 23 March 2017. She focused on matters of prison system, mental health care, addiction and drug rehabilitation.

Bouwmeester went on pregnancy and maternity leave from 1 March 2016 to 10 June 2016 and was temporarily replaced by Harm Brouwer.

Bouwmeester studied social rights service at Amsterdam University of Applied Sciences.
