= Anloo =

- Village
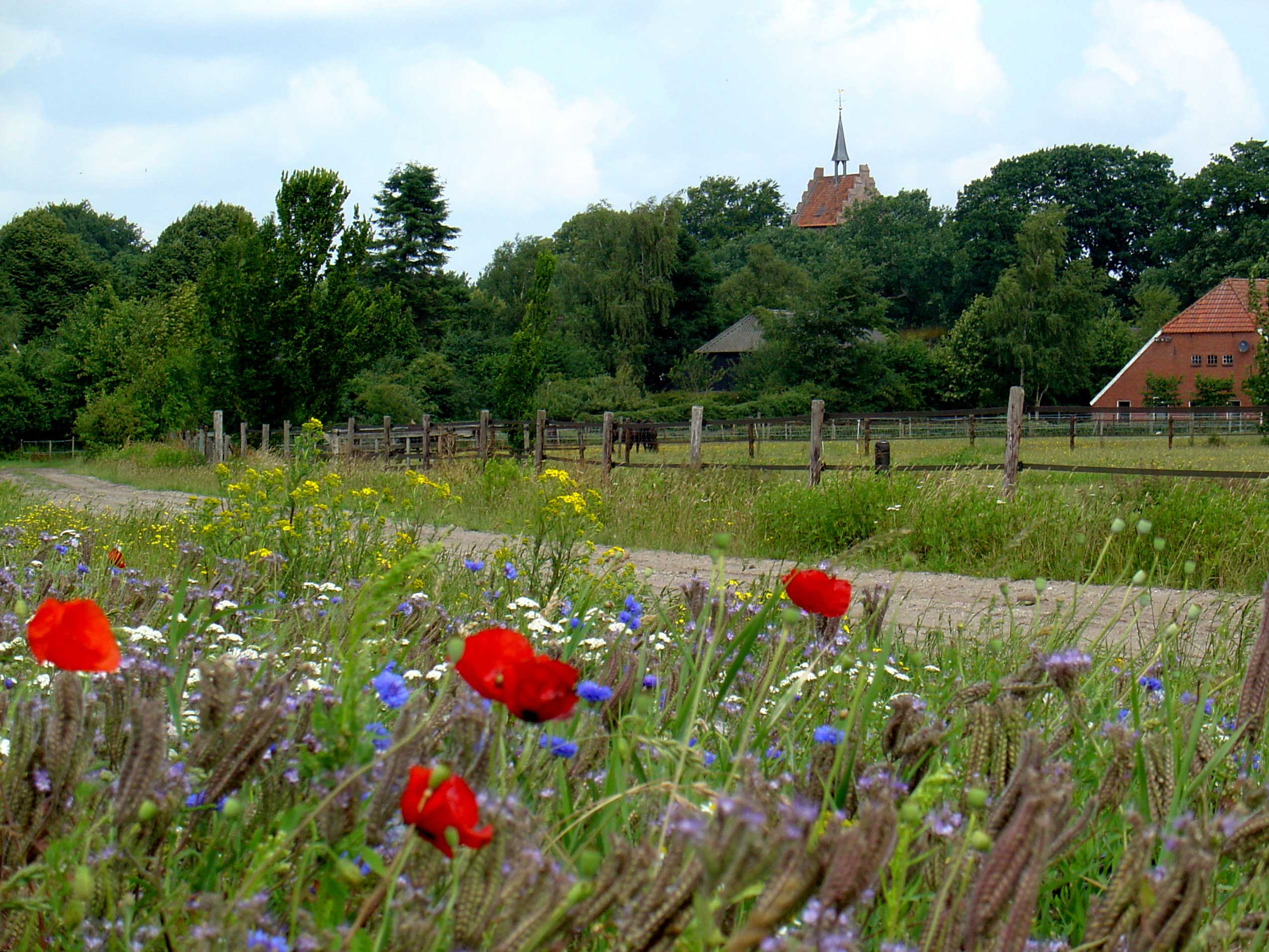
- Anloo from the south

- Flag Coat of arms

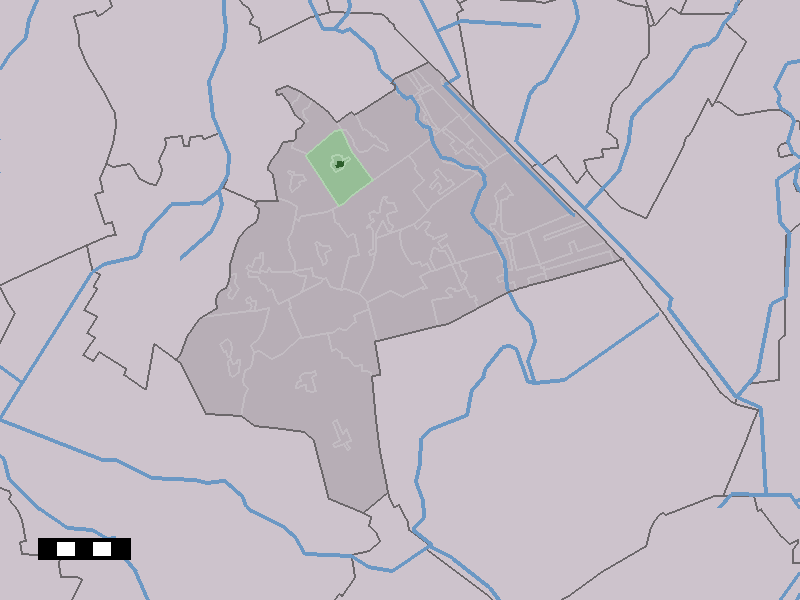
- The village centre (dark green) and the statistical district (light green) of Anloo in the municipality of Aa en Hunze.

- Location in the Netherlands Anloo (Netherlands)
- Coordinates: 53°2′36″N 6°41′58″E
- Country: Netherlands
- Province: Drenthe
- Municipality: Aa en Hunze

Area
  - Total: 8.16 km^{2} (3.15 sq mi)
- Elevation: 14 m (46 ft)

Population (2021)
  - Total: 385
  - Density: 47.2/km^{2} (122/sq mi)
- Time zone: UTC+1 (CET)
  - Summer (DST): UTC+2 (CEST)
- Postal code: 9467
- Dialing code: 0592

Anloo is a village in the Dutch province of Drenthe. It is a part of the municipality of Aa en Hunze, and lies about 10 km east of Assen.

== History ==
The village was first mentioned in 1139 as Anloe. The etymology in unclear. Anloo is an esdorp, which developed in the Early Middle Ages on the Hondsrug. It was the capital of the dingspel (medieval judicial area) of Oostermoer, one of six dingspels of Drenthe. The village has two brinks (village squares). The eastern square contains the church in an elevated position. The western square is elongated and contained the former Elentsborg havezate (manor house), demolished in 1838.

The Magnus Church dates from around 1100 and replaced a wooden church. It has been extended several times. The spire dates from 1757. The church was restored between 1941 and 1944. Wall paintings depicting the life of the Virgin Mary were painted in around 1300. During the Middle Ages, the church also served as court house.

Anloo was home to 277 people in 1840. During World War II, there was an underground shelter in the forest. The hut was discovered on 29 September 1944. Of the eight onderduikers (people in hiding), three were captured and executed at Westerbork transit camp; the others managed to escape. On 8 April 1945, three days before liberation, ten members of the Dutch Resistance were executed at the hut. The resistance members were held captive at Scholtenhuis in Groningen by the Sicherheitsdienst. On 10 April, their bodies were discovered by a passer-by. In 1970, a monument was unveiled at the hut for the victims.

Until 1998, Anloo was a separate municipality, though the town hall was in Annen. In 1998, it was merged into Aa en Hunze.

== Hunebedden ==
There are four hunebedden (dolmen) around Anloo.

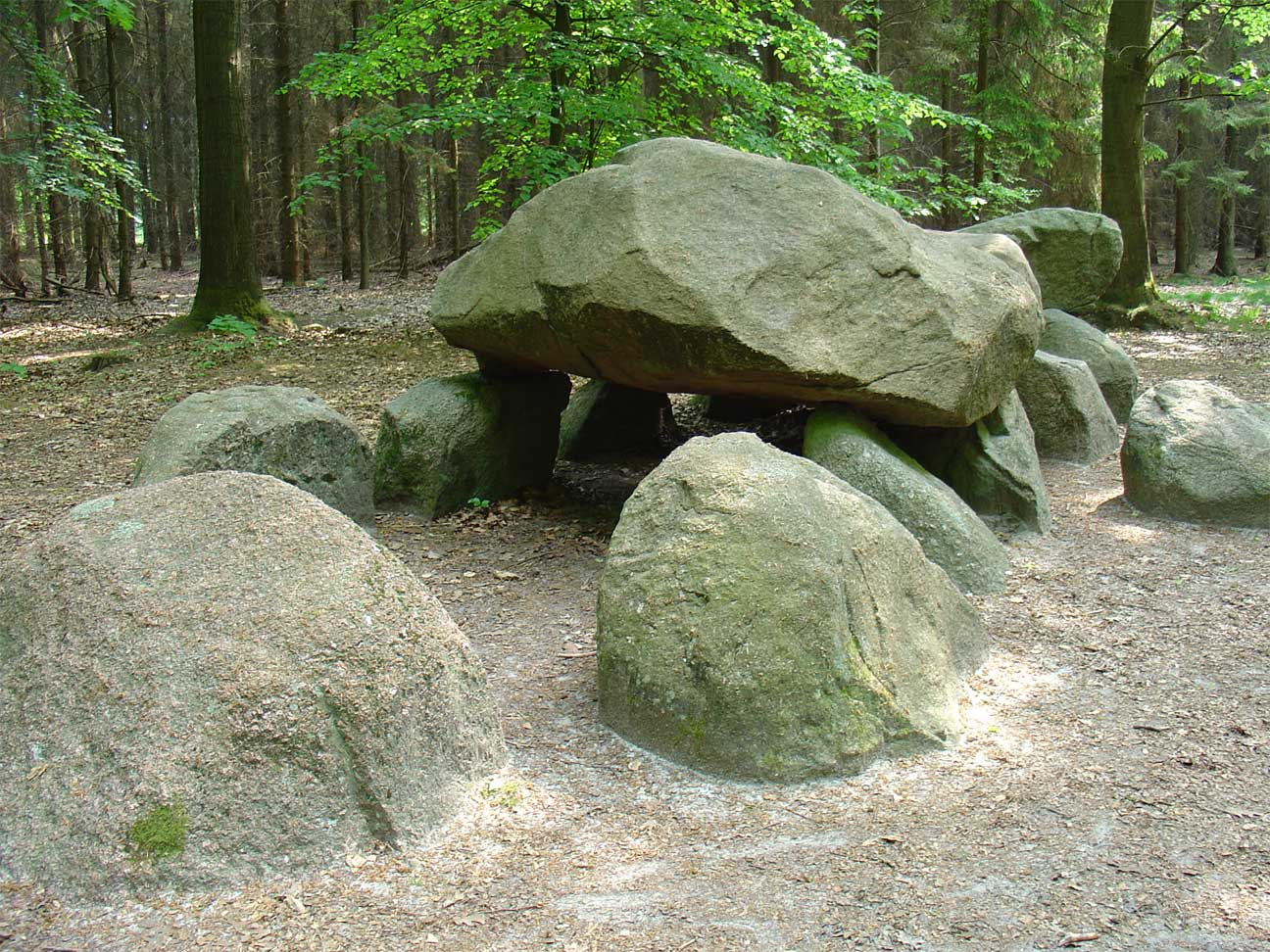
Dolmen D11

Hunebed D7 is hidden in forest and on military terrain. It consists of four capstones, one of them fallen. A large part of the dolmen is still buried underground.

Hunebed D8 is in the forest and has four capstones and eight side stones. One portal stone has remained. The missing portal stone has been marked by a concrete cast.

Hunebed D9 is a small incomplete dolmen near the main road in the built-up area.

Hunebed D11 is on the Terborgh estate. It is medium-sized with four capstones; it is well preserved and only one capstone was removed. Some artefacts from the dolmen were recovered in 1879, and are on display in the British Museum; however, the dolmen has not been scientifically researched yet. It was restored in 1951.

== Nature ==
Anloo is surrounded by forests. Strubben–Kniphorstbos is a nature reserve of 377 hectares (930 acres) and an archaeological reserve, with dolmens and many ancient burial mounds.

== Transport ==
There is no railway station in Anloo. The nearest station is Assen railway station. Bus service 58 runs through Anloo and goes to Assen railway station.

For further information, see Aa en Hunze#Transportation.

== Notable people ==
- Harm Brouwer (born 1957), politician

== Gallery ==
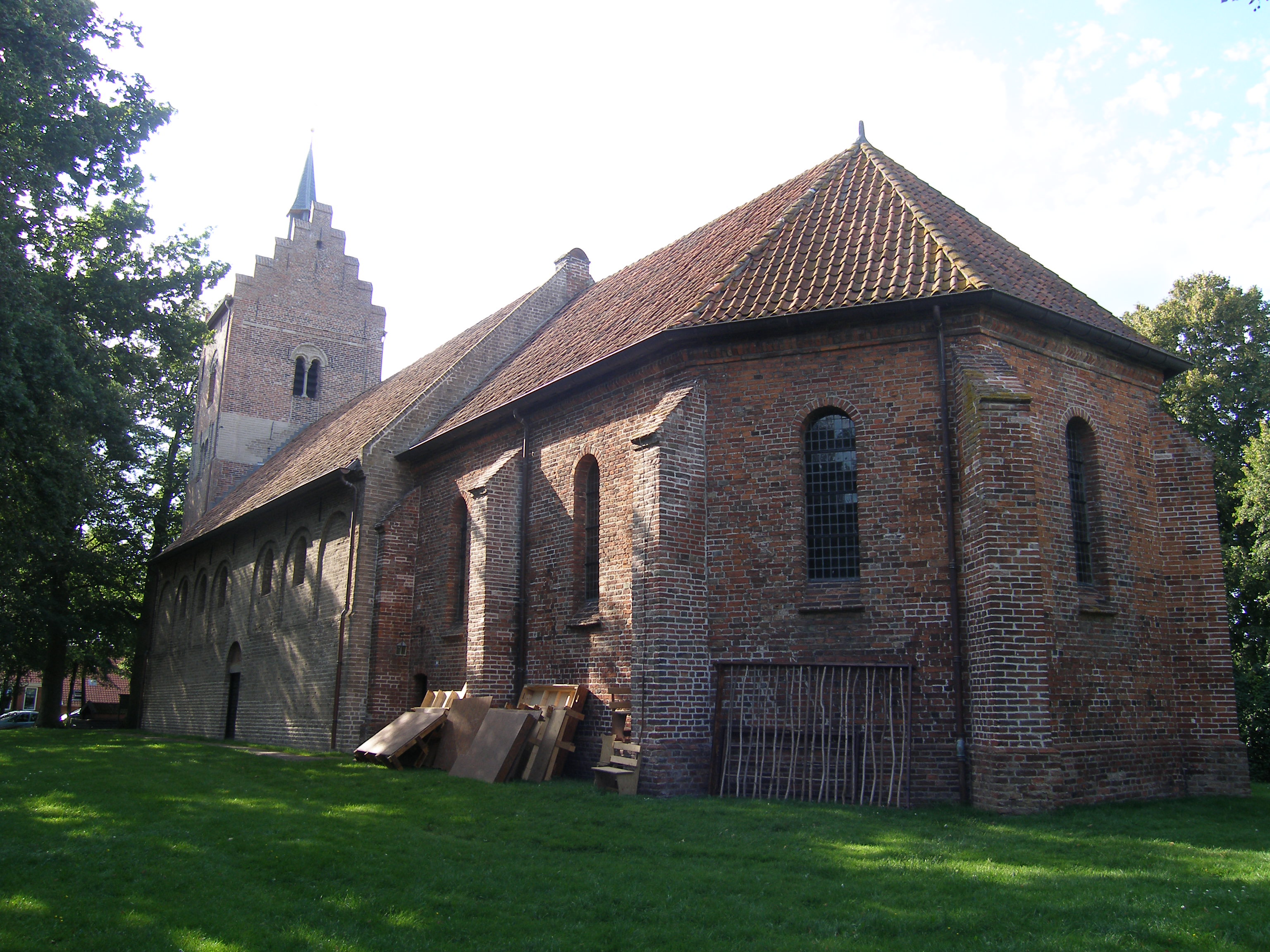
The Magnuskerk (Anloo)

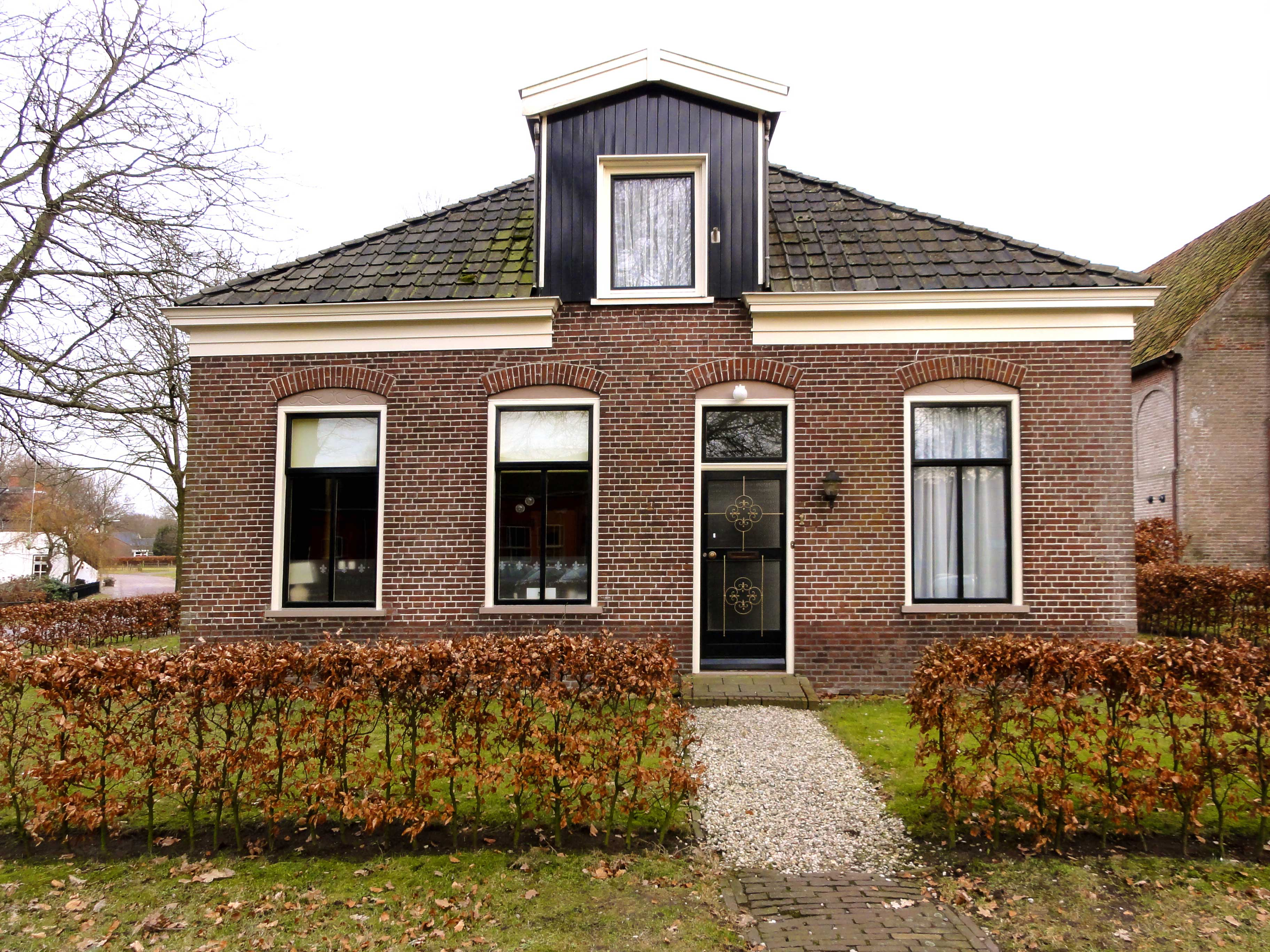
Former clergy house

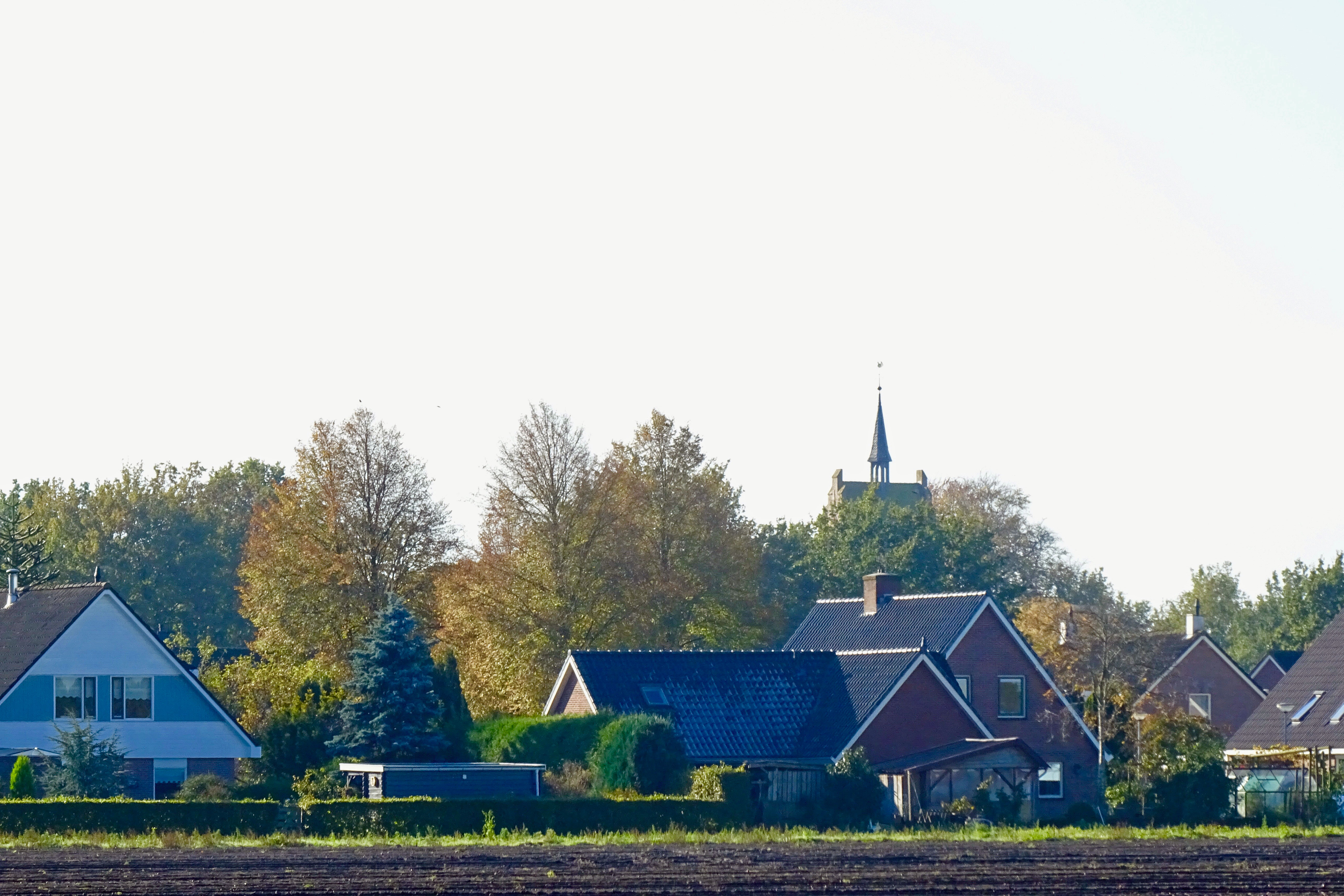
View on Anloo

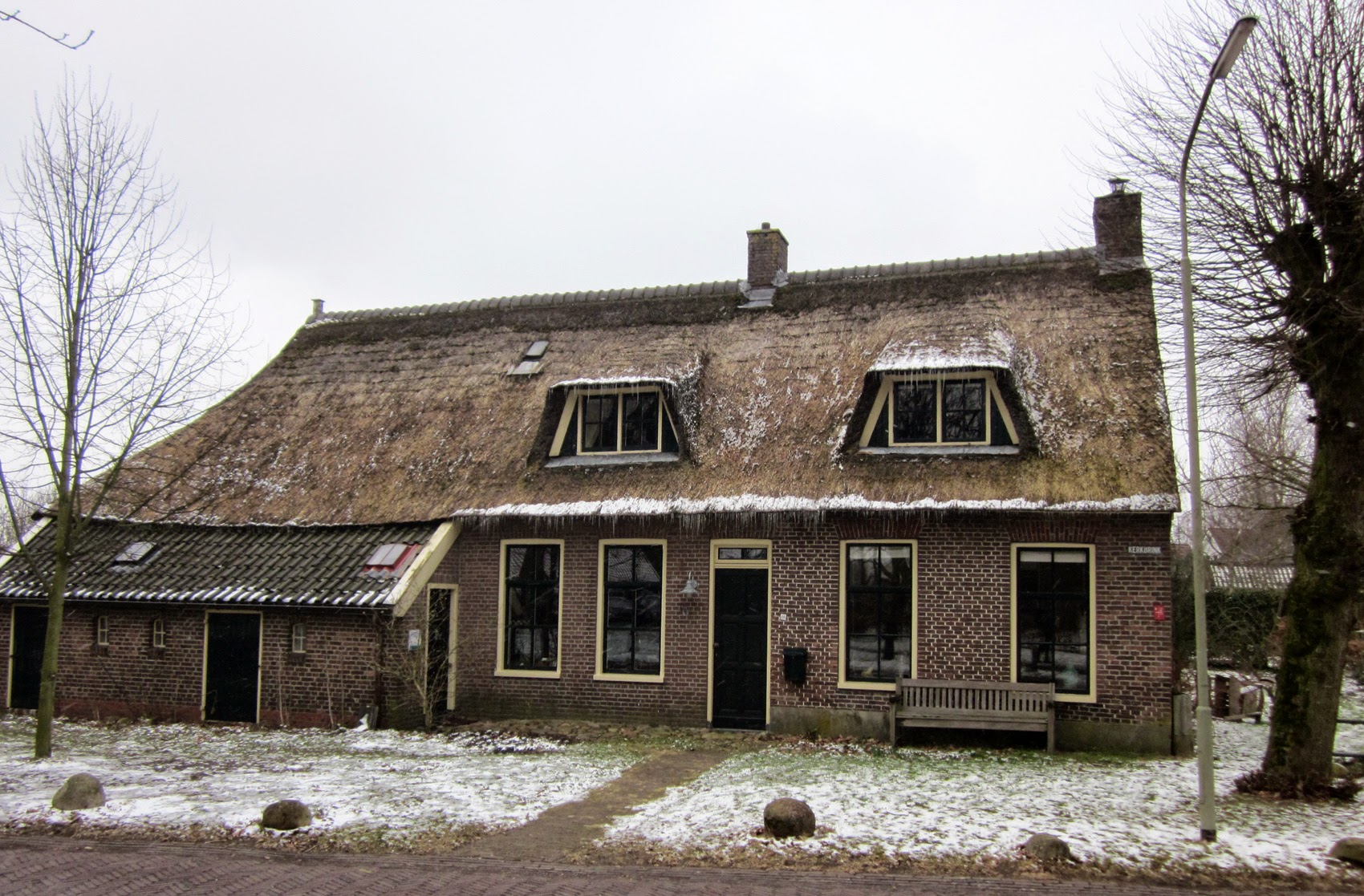
House on the church brink (village square)
