= Drentsche Aa National Park =

National park in the Netherlands

- Nationaal Park Drentsche Aa
- IUCN category II (national park)
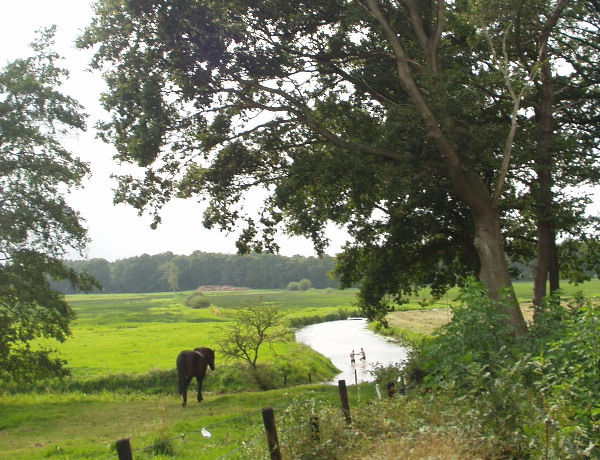
- The Drentsche Aa

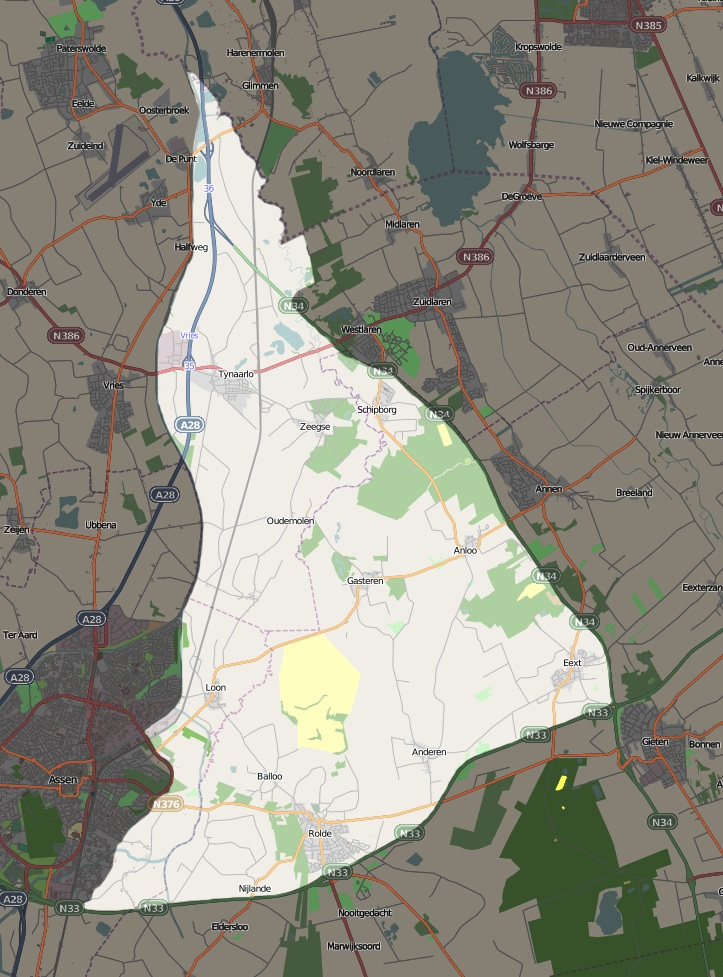
- Map of the National Park
- Location: Drenthe, Netherlands
- Coordinates: 53°3′N 6°39′E
- Area: 100 km^{2} (39 sq mi)
- Established: 2002
- Governing body: Het Overlegorgaan Nationaal beek- en esdorpenlandschap Drentsche Aa
- Website: www.drentscheaa.nl

National Park Drentsche Aa is a national park of the Netherlands located in the province of Drenthe on the west side of the Hondsrug. It consists of the cultural landscape surrounding the valley of the small river the Drentsche Aa. The landscape is currently nearly the same as it was in the mid 19th century, as the several agricultural landscape reforms of the 20th century were not implemented in this area. Because of this, many hedges, heathlands and traditionally managed fields ('essen' in Dutch) were spared from transformation. The national park is part of the (three times) larger national landscape Drentsche Aa.
