= Drenthe University of Applied Sciences =

Former vocational university in the Netherlands

Drenthe University of Applied Sciences (Dutch: Hogeschool Drenthe) is a former vocational university in the Netherlands. Located in the province of Drenthe, its departments were scattered across the cities of Assen, Emmen, and Meppel. Since 2008, it is merged with CHN University of Applied Sciences (Christelijke Hogeschool Nederland) to Stenden University of Applied Sciences.

== History ==
In terms of its name, Stenden University of Applied Sciences is fairly new (January 2008). Yet the college has a long history, being the result of a merger between Christelijke Hogeschool Nederland (CHN) and Hogeschool Drenthe (HD). The merger partners each have their own genesis history, which began in Meppel in 1845 with the private education for teachers.

In Emmen, Assen and Meppel the three pabos were started. In the early 1980s the laboratory training IHBO was added in Emmen and not long after that the HEAO. In the mid-1980s, these programs merged to form Hogeschool Drenthe. In 1987, location Leeuwarden began youth welfare work and the Hotel Management School Leeuwarden (HMSL), which then merged to form Christelijke Hogeschool Noord Nederland (CHNN). Since January 2008, Hogeschool Drenthe merged with Christelijke Hogeschool Nederland (CHN) in Leeuwarden to form Stenden Hogeschool. Since then, both locations Emmen and Leeuwarden have expanded; in addition to Dutch students, students from other European countries and from Asia also study there.
