= Schipborg =

- Village
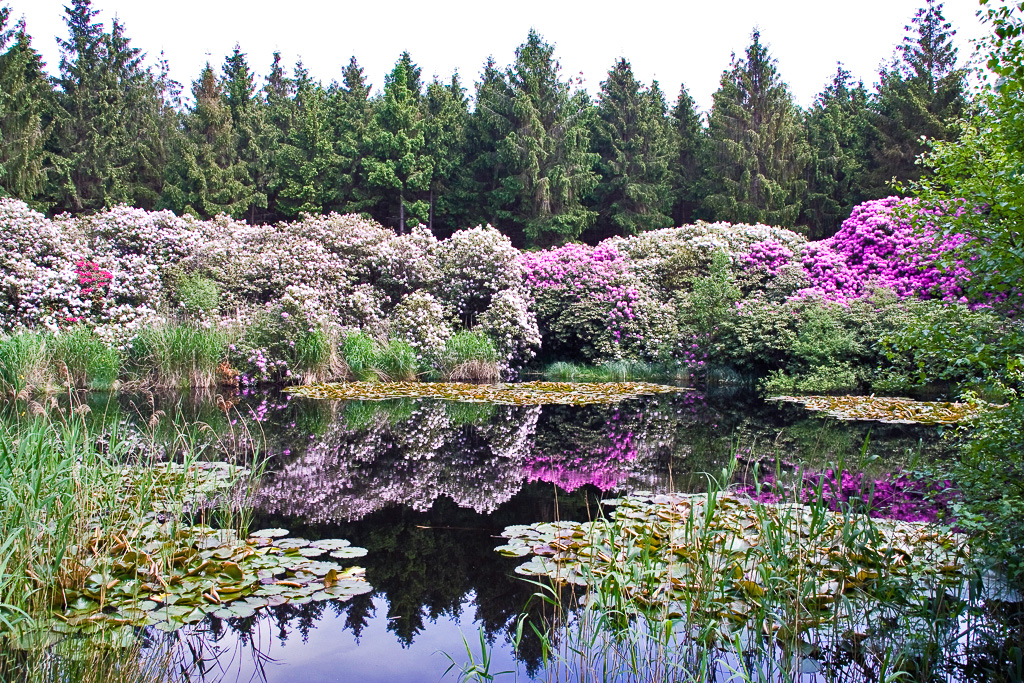
- Nature near Schipborg

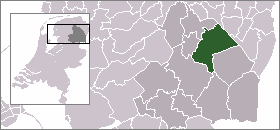

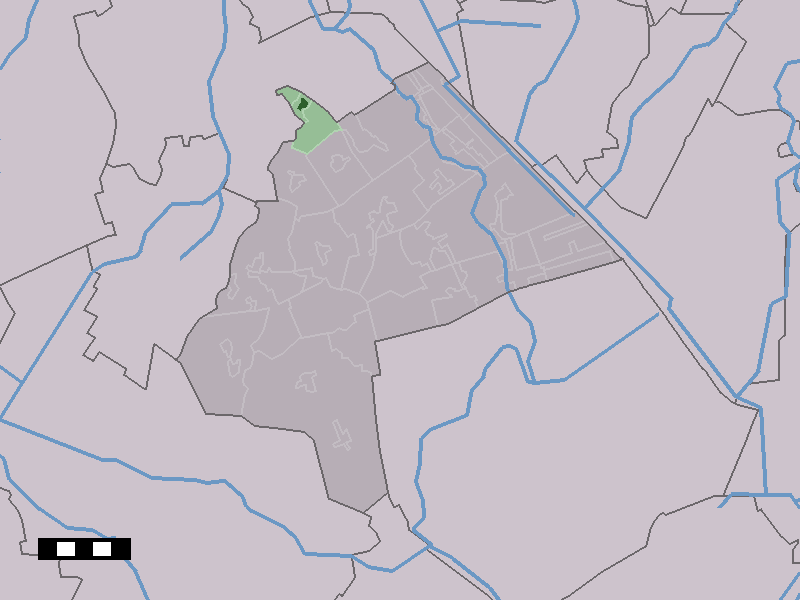
- The village centre (dark green) and the statistical district (light green) of Schipborg in the municipality of Aa en Hunze.
- Coordinates: 53°4′28″N 6°40′10″E
- Country: Netherlands
- Province: Drenthe
- Municipality: Aa en Hunze

Area
  - Total: 5.92 km^{2} (2.29 sq mi)
- Elevation: 6 m (20 ft)

Population (2021)
  - Total: 590
  - Density: 100/km^{2} (260/sq mi)
- Time zone: UTC+1 (CET)
  - Summer (DST): UTC+2 (CEST)
- Postal code: 9469
- Dialing code: 050

Schipborg is a village in the Dutch province of Drenthe. It is a part of the municipality of Aa en Hunze, and lies about 11 km northeast of Assen.

The village was first mentioned between 1298 and 1304 as Borc, and is a combination of a tree (probably a birch) and ship.

Schipborg was home to 84 people in 1840.

== Gallery ==
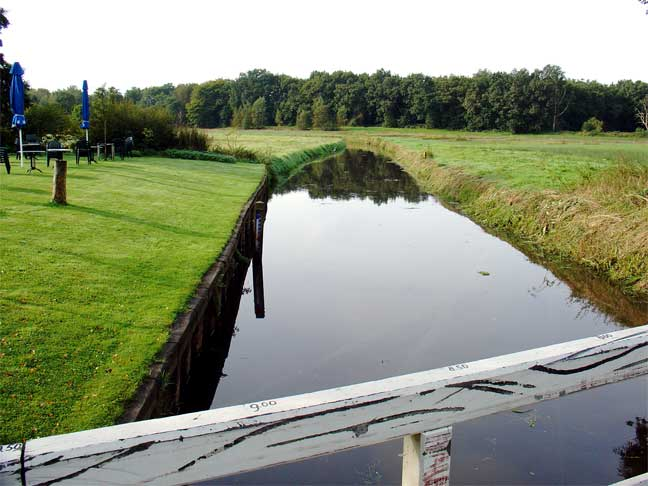
Drentsche Aa near Schipborg

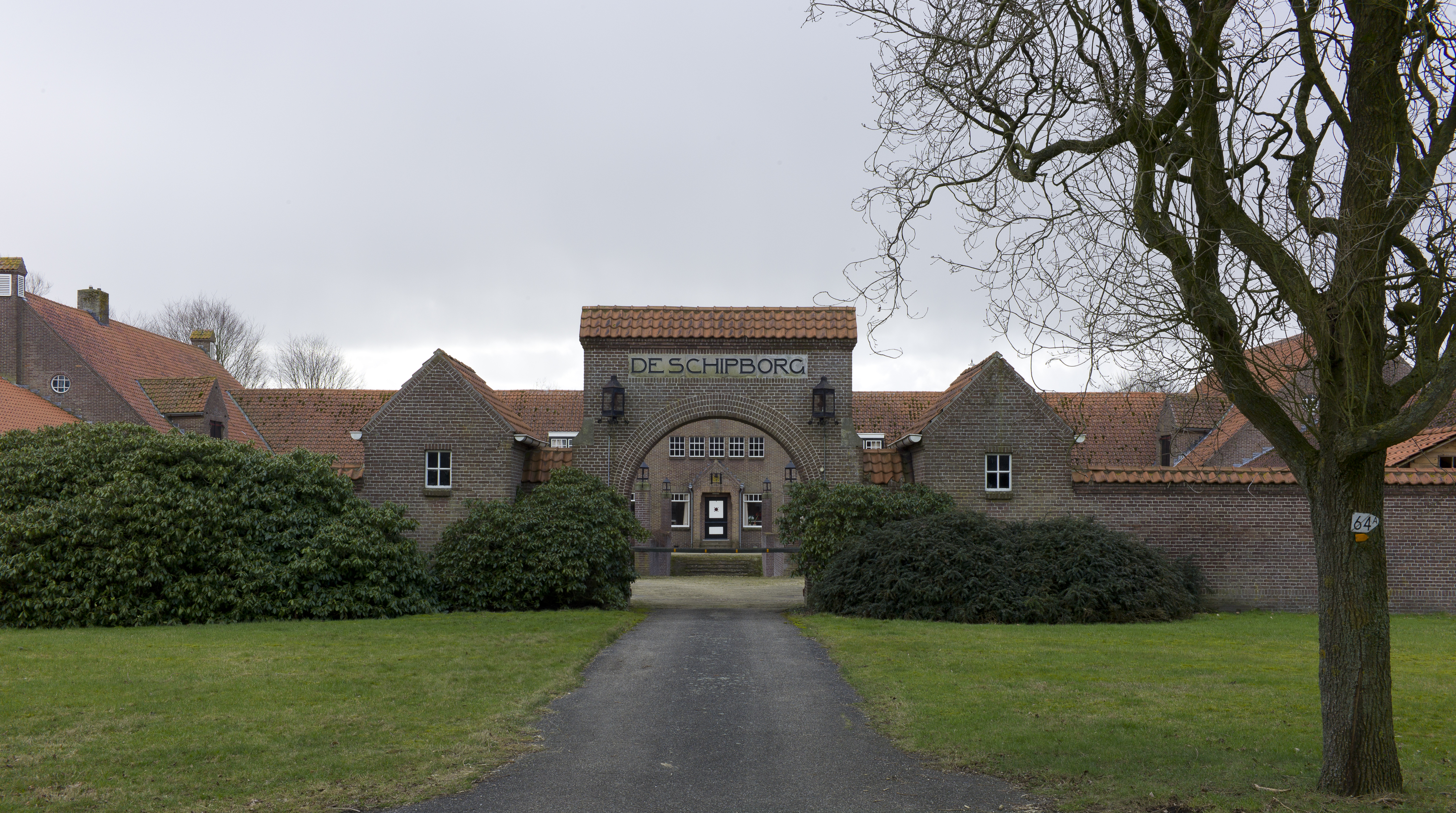
De Schipborg

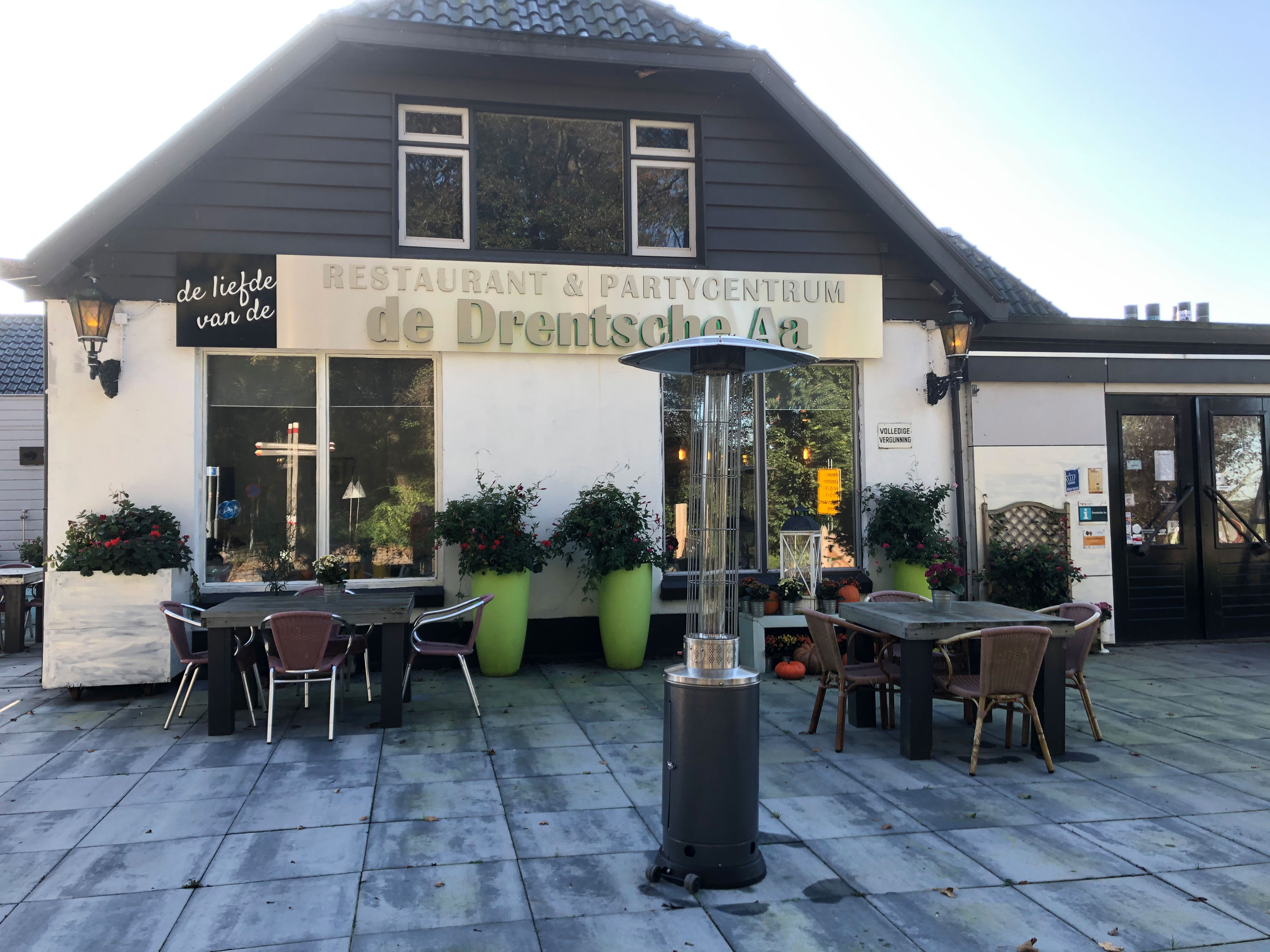
Restaurant in Schipborg

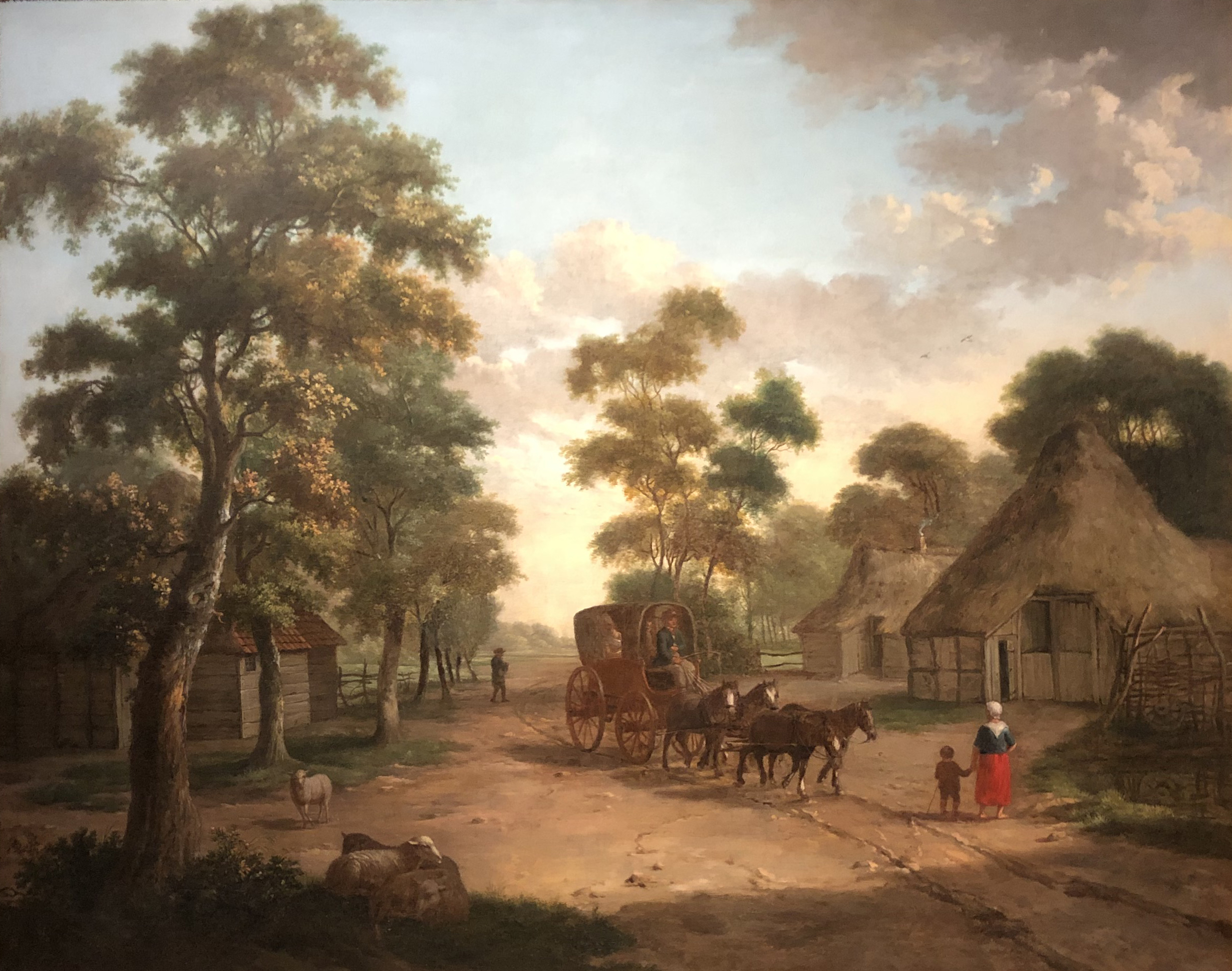
Painting of Schipborg (1806)
