= Joyce Vermue =

Dutch politician

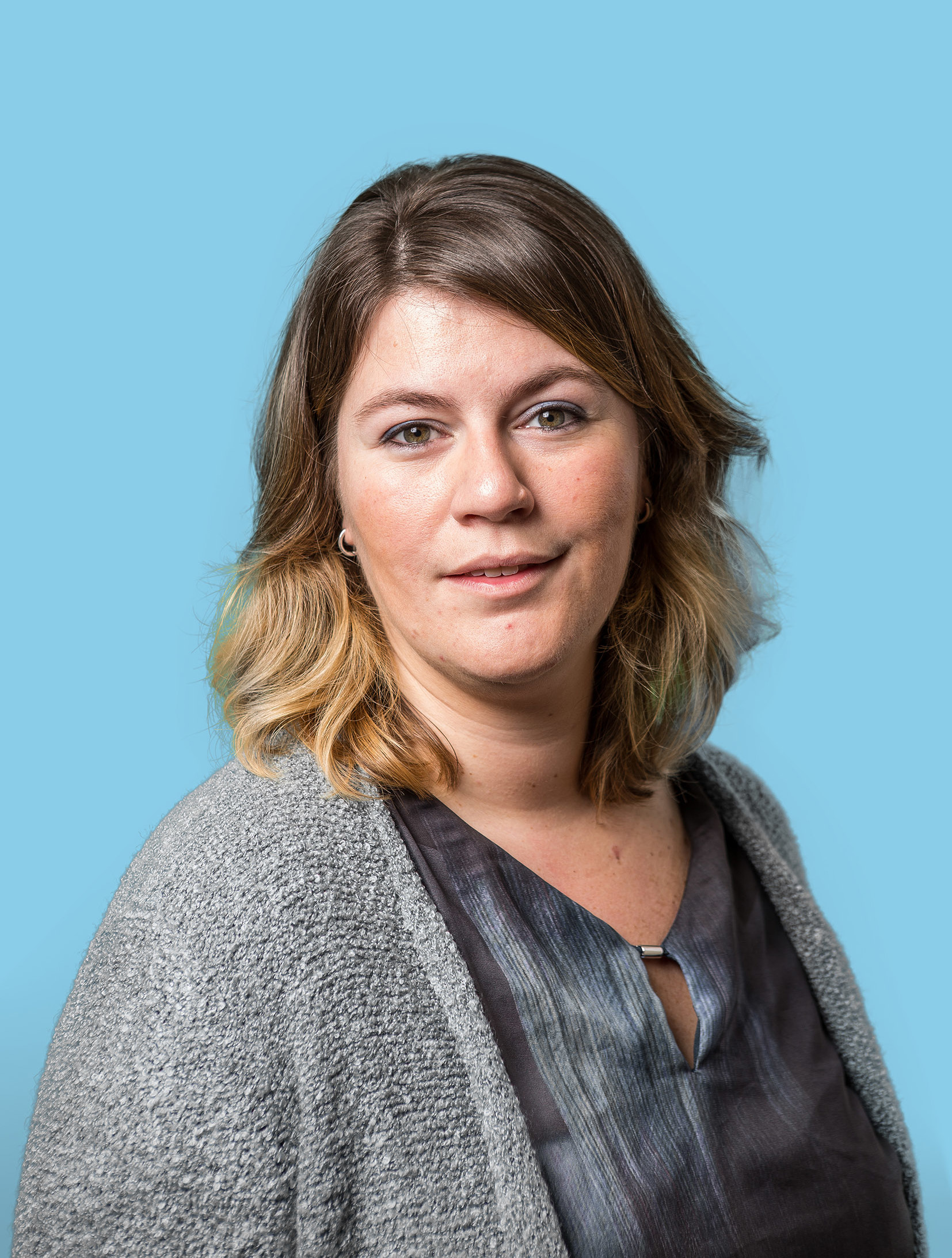

Mayor of Zundert
- Incumbent
- Assumed office 3 July 2019

Member of the House of Representatives of the Netherlands
- In office 22 September 2015 – 23 March 2017

Personal details
- Born: 22 June 1985 (age 41) Oostburg, Netherlands
- Party: Labour Party

Joyce Vermue (born 22 June 1985) is a Dutch politician. She was a member of the House of Representatives of the Netherlands for the Labour Party between 22 September 2015 and 23 March 2017. She has been mayor of Zundert since July 2019.

== Career ==
Vermue was born on 22 June 1985 in Oostburg. After completing her high school education in Oostburg she studied social work at the Avans University of Applied Sciences in Breda between 2002 and 2006 and obtained a BA. She earned a further MA in 2011. Vermue has worked for social work foundations since 2005 and has served as director of the Stichting Welzijn in West Zeelandic Flanders since September 2014.

Vermue was member of the municipal council of Sluis for the Labour Party between April 2010 and September 2013.

In the parliamentary elections of 2012 Vermue occupied number 48 on the Labour Party list and was not elected. On 22 September 2015 she joined the House of Representatives of the Netherlands and started the temporary replacement of Manon Fokke who went on maternity leave. On 5 November 2015 she became a permanent member of the House when fellow Labour Party MP Martijn van Dam joined the cabinet. Her term in the House ended on 23 March 2017.

She was installed as mayor of Zundert on 3 July 2019, at that point she became youngest mayor in the Netherlands.
