= Drenthe =

Province of the Netherlands

Drenthe Drenthe (Dutch)
- Province
- Province of Drenthe; Provincie Drenthe (Dutch); Provincie Drenthe (Drents)
- Flag Coat of arms Brandmark
- Anthem: "Mien Drenthe" "My Drenthe"
- Location of Drenthe in the Netherlands

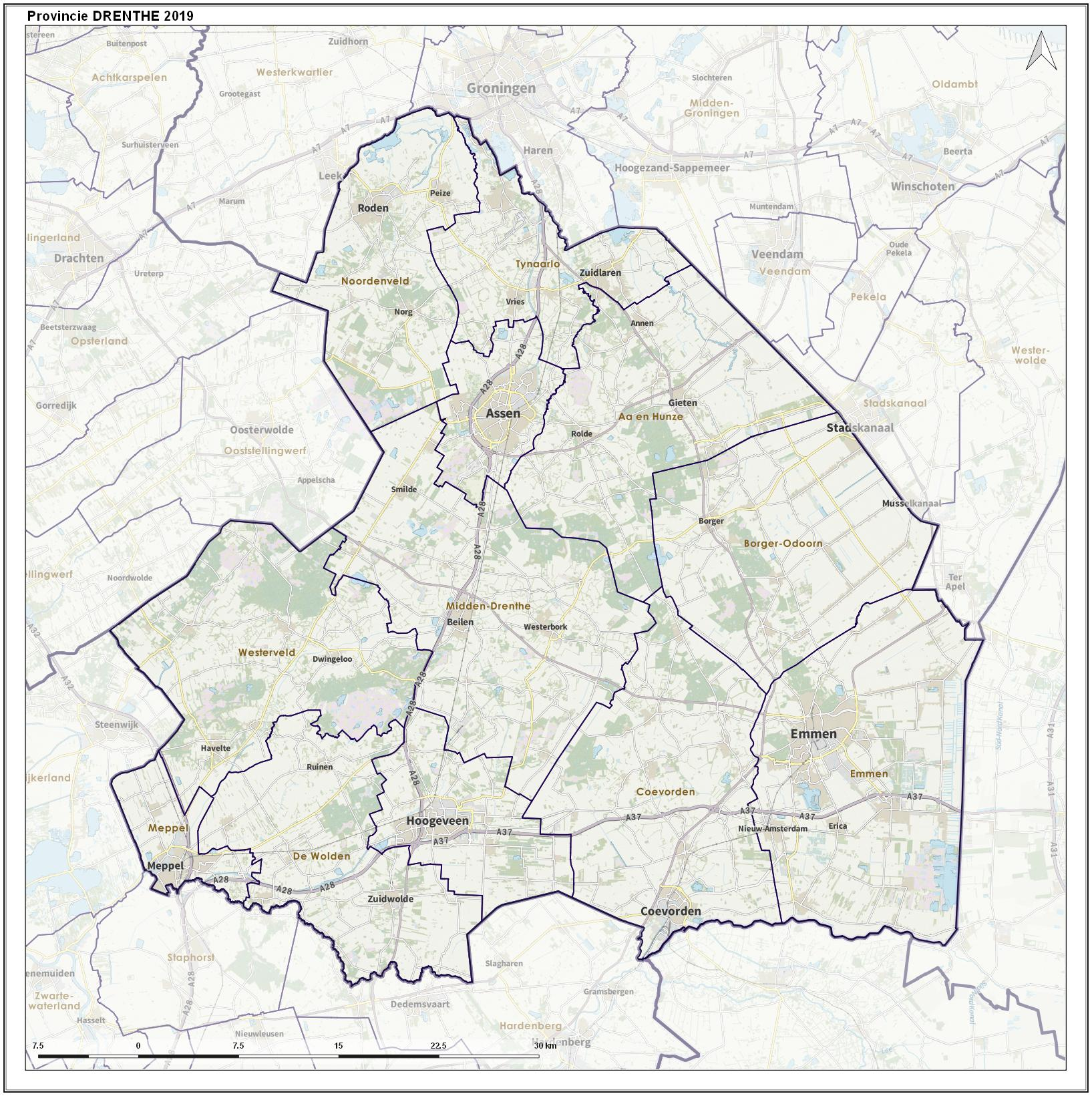
- Topography map of Drenthe
- Coordinates: 52°55′N 6°35′E
- Country: Netherlands
- Capital: Assen
- Largest city: Emmen

Government
  - King's Commissioner: Agnes Mulder (CDA)
  - Council: States of Drenthe

Area (2023)
  - Total: 2,680 km^{2} (1,030 sq mi)
  - Land: 2,633 km^{2} (1,017 sq mi)
  - Water: 48 km^{2} (19 sq mi)
  - Rank: 9th

Population (1 January 2023)
  - Total: 502,051
  - Rank: 10th
  - Density: 191/km^{2} (490/sq mi)
  - Rank: 12th nationally

GDP
  - Total: €22.581 billion (2024)
  - Per capita: €44,626 (2024)
- Time zone: UTC+1 (CET)
  - Summer (DST): UTC+2 (CEST)
- ISO 3166 code: NL-DR
- HDI (2021): 0.917 very high · 10th
- Website: www.provincie.drenthe.nl

Drenthe (Dutch pronunciation: [ˈdrɛntə]) is a province of the Netherlands located in the northeastern part of the country. It is bordered by Overijssel to the south, Friesland to the west, Groningen to the north, and the German state of Lower Saxony to the east. As of January 2023, Drenthe had a population of about 502,000, and a total area of 2,680 km^{2} (1,030 sq mi).

Drenthe has been populated for 15,000 years. The region has subsequently been part of the Episcopal principality of Utrecht, Habsburg Netherlands, Dutch Republic, Batavian Republic, Kingdom of Holland and Kingdom of the Netherlands. Drenthe has been an official province since 1796. The capital and seat of the provincial government is Assen. The King's Commissioner of Drenthe is Jetta Klijnsma. The Farmer-Citizen Movement (BBB) is the largest party in the States-Provincial, followed by the Labour Party (PvdA) and the People's Party for Freedom and Democracy (VVD).

Drenthe has the lowest population density in the European Netherlands. It is a predominantly rural area, unlike many other parts of the Netherlands; except for the small cities of Assen (pop. 67,963) and Emmen (pop. 58,130), the land in Drenthe is mainly used for agriculture and it has a notable amount of forests and nature.

== History ==
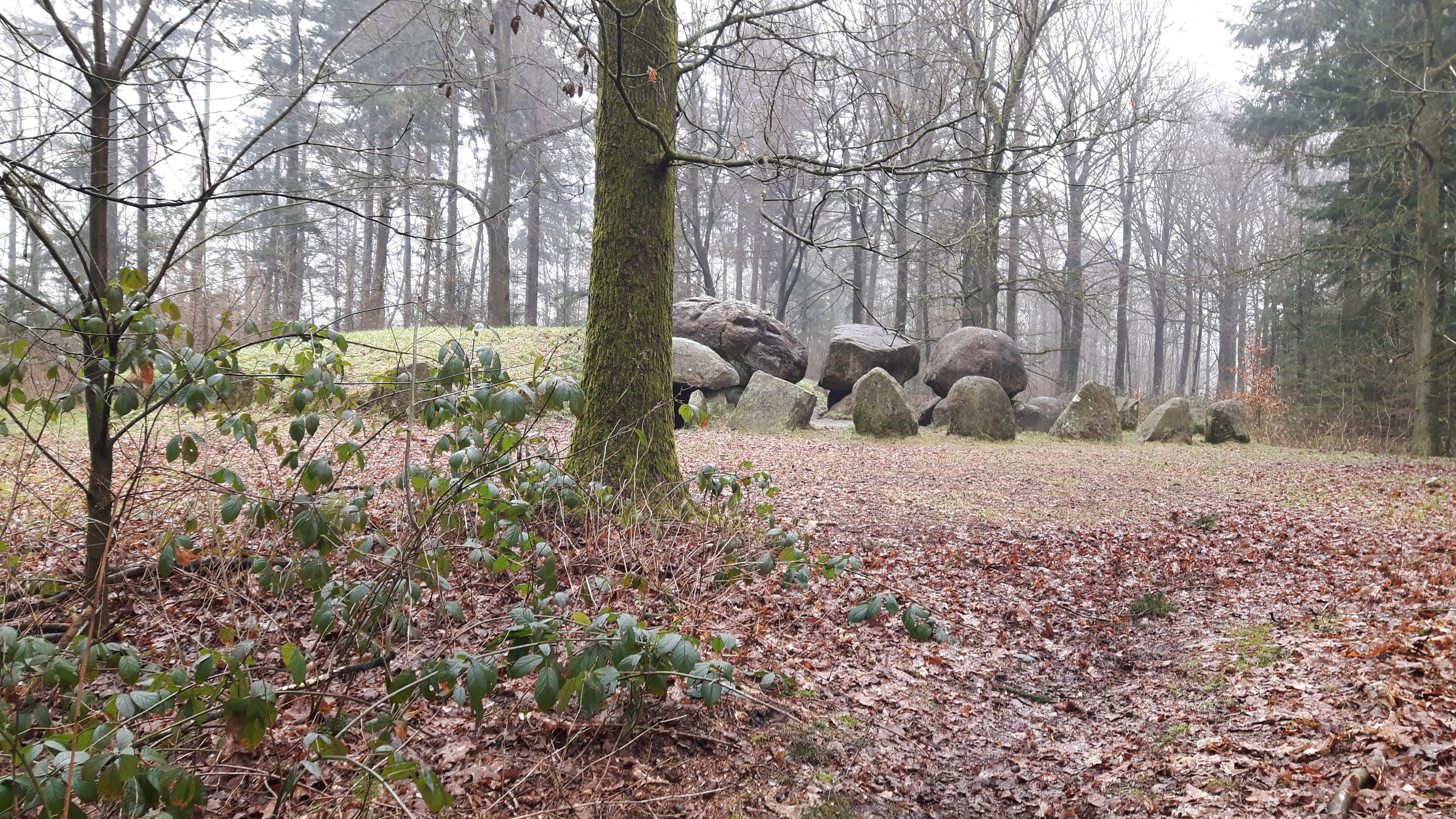
Papeloze Kerk, a dolmen (hunebed) near Schoonoord

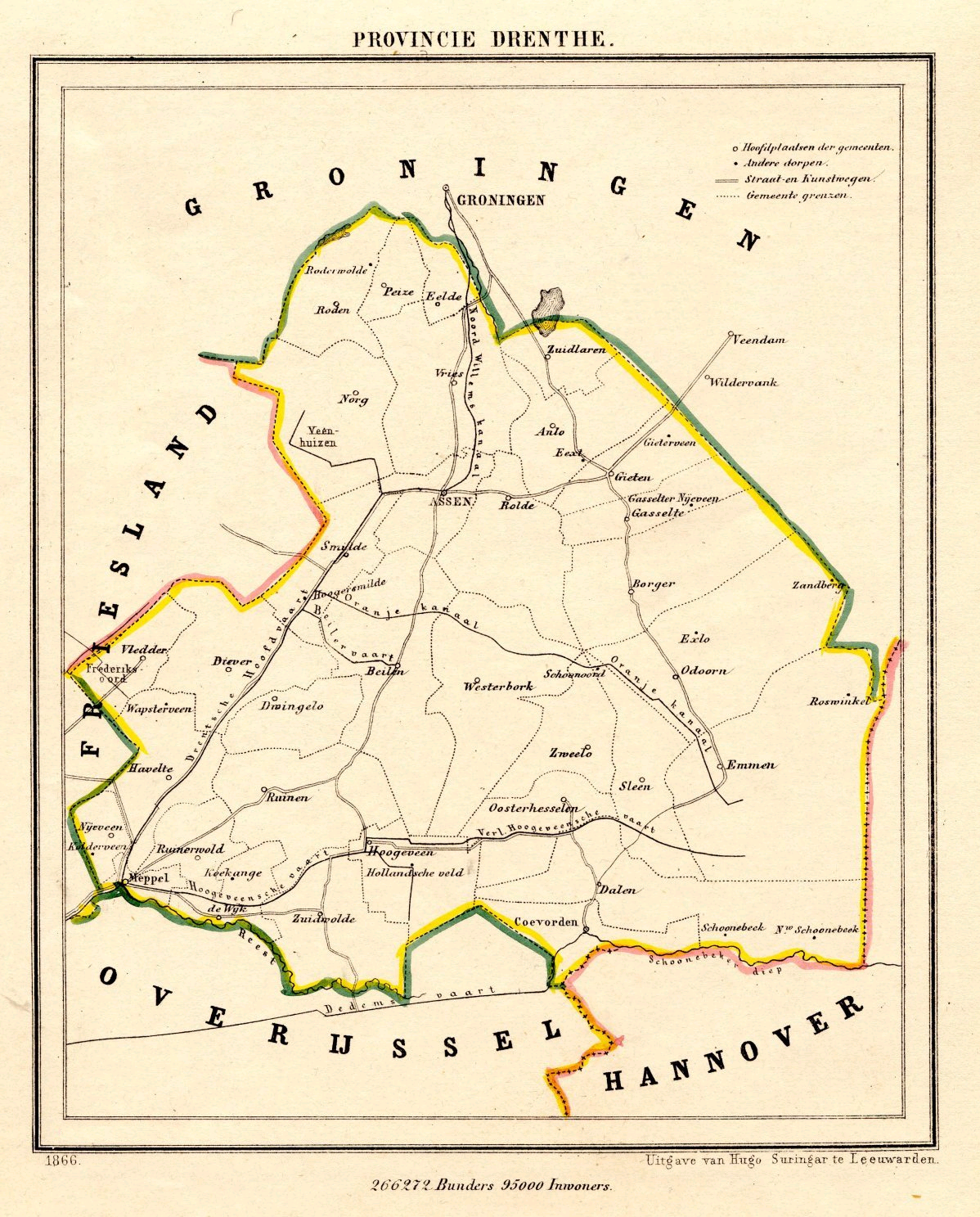
Map of Drenthe, 1866

The name Drenthe is said to stem from Germanic thrija hantja meaning "three lands".

Drenthe has been populated by people since prehistory. Artifacts from the Wolstonian Stage (150,000 years ago) are among the oldest found in the Netherlands. In fact, it was one of the most densely populated areas of the Netherlands until the Bronze Age. The most tangible evidence of this are the dolmens (hunebedden) built around 3500 BC. 53 of the 54 dolmens in the Netherlands can be found in Drenthe, concentrated in the northeast of the province. In 2006, the archaeological reserve of Strubben–Kniphorstbos, located between Anloo and Schipborg, was created to preserve part of this heritage.

Most of the Bronze Age objects found in the Netherlands have been found in Drenthe. One item shows that trading networks during this period extended a far distance. Large bronze situlae (buckets) found in Drenthe were manufactured somewhere in eastern France or in Switzerland. They were used for mixing wine with water (a Roman/Greek custom). The many finds in Drenthe of rare and valuable objects, such as tin-bead necklaces, suggest that Drenthe was a trading centre in the Netherlands in the Bronze Age.

Drenthe was first mentioned in a document from 820, it was called Pago Treanth (Drenthe district). In archives from Het Utrechts Archief, from 1024 to 1025, the "county Drenthe" is mentioned, when Emperor Henry II gave it to Bishop Adalbold II of Utrecht. Subjugation of this region into the Holy Roman Empire culminated in the Drenther Crusade launched by the Papacy around 1228-1232.

After long being subject to the Utrecht diocese, Bishop Henry of Wittelsbach in 1528 ceded Drenthe to Emperor Charles V of Habsburg, who incorporated it into the Habsburg Netherlands. When the Republic of the Seven United Provinces was declared in 1581, Drenthe became part of it as the County of Drenthe, although it never gained full provincial status due to its poverty; the province was so poor it was exempt from paying federal taxes and as a consequence was denied representation in the States General. The successor Batavian Republic granted it provincial status on 1 January 1796.

Shortly before the outbreak of the Second World War, the Dutch government built a camp near the town of Hooghalen to intern German Jewish refugees. During the Second World War, the German occupiers used the camp (which they named KZ Westerbork) as a Durchgangslager (transit camp). Many Dutch Jews, Sinti, Roma, resistance combatants and political adversaries were imprisoned before being transferred to concentration and extermination camps in Germany and occupied Poland. Anne Frank was deported on the last train leaving the Westerbork transit camp on 3 September 1944.

In the 1970s, there were four hostage crises where South Moluccan terrorists demanded an independent Republic of South Maluku. They held hostages in hijacked trains in 1975 and 1977, in a primary school in 1977, and in the province hall in 1978.

== Geography ==
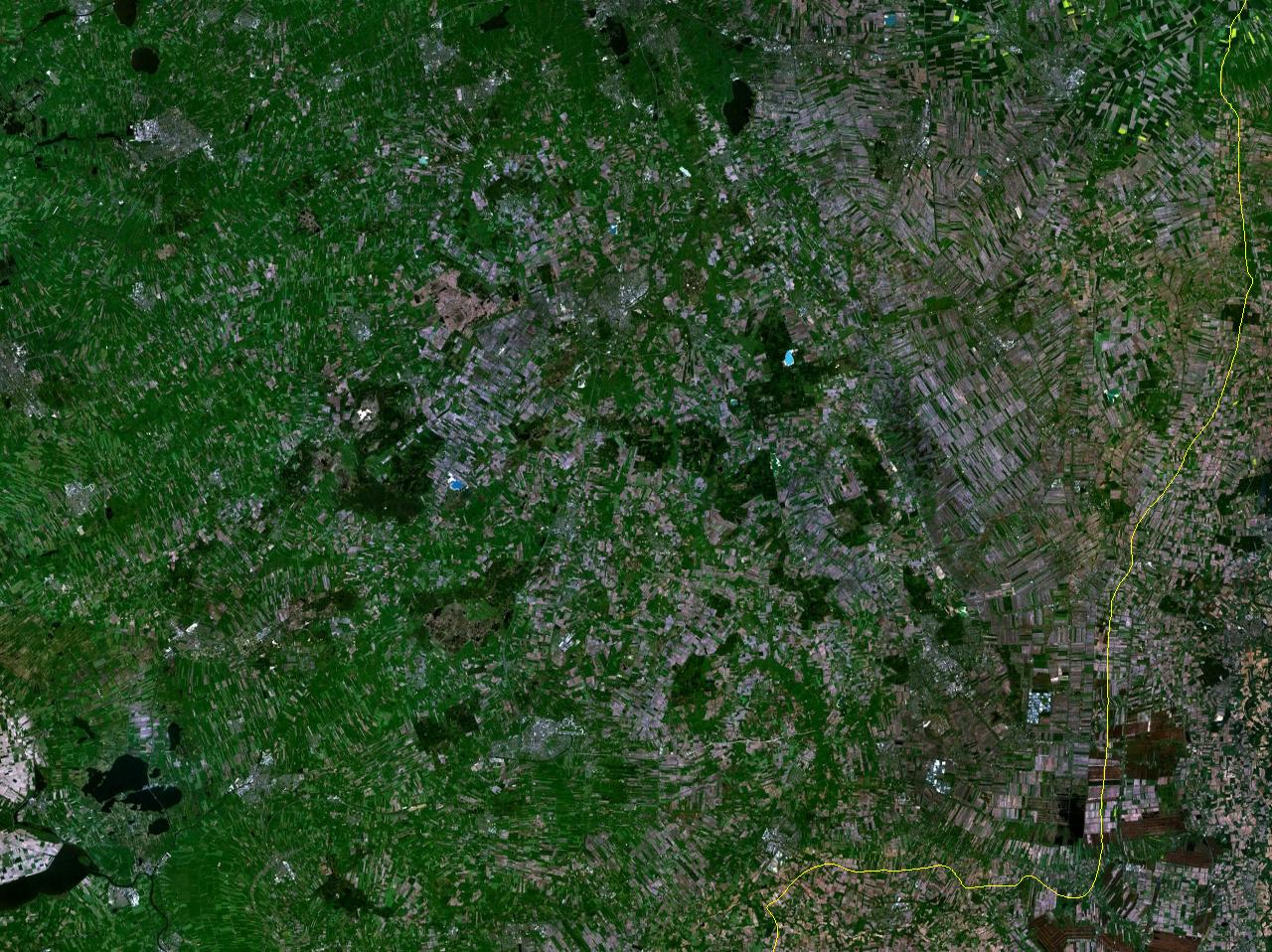
Satellite image of Drenthe

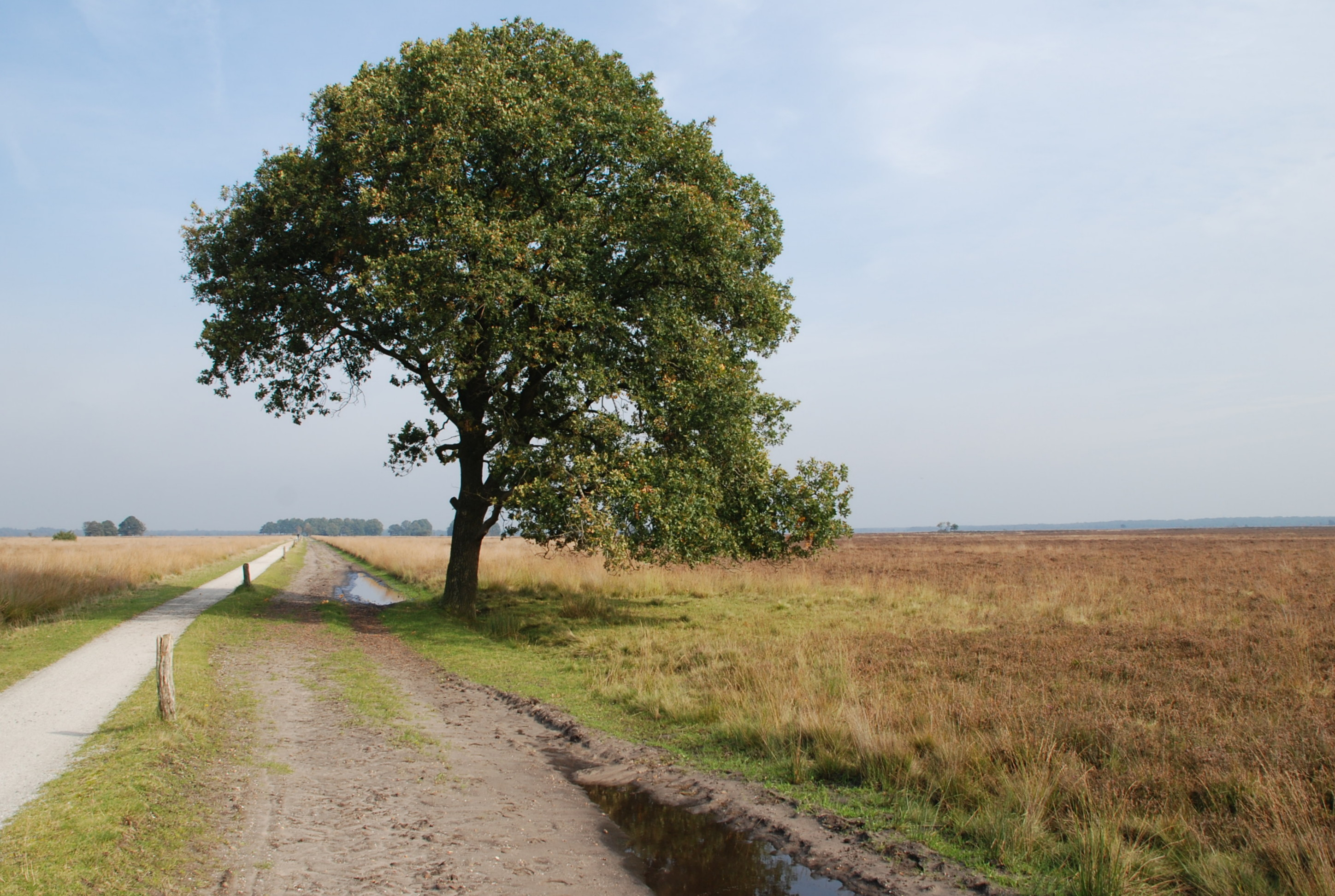
Dwingelderveld National Park

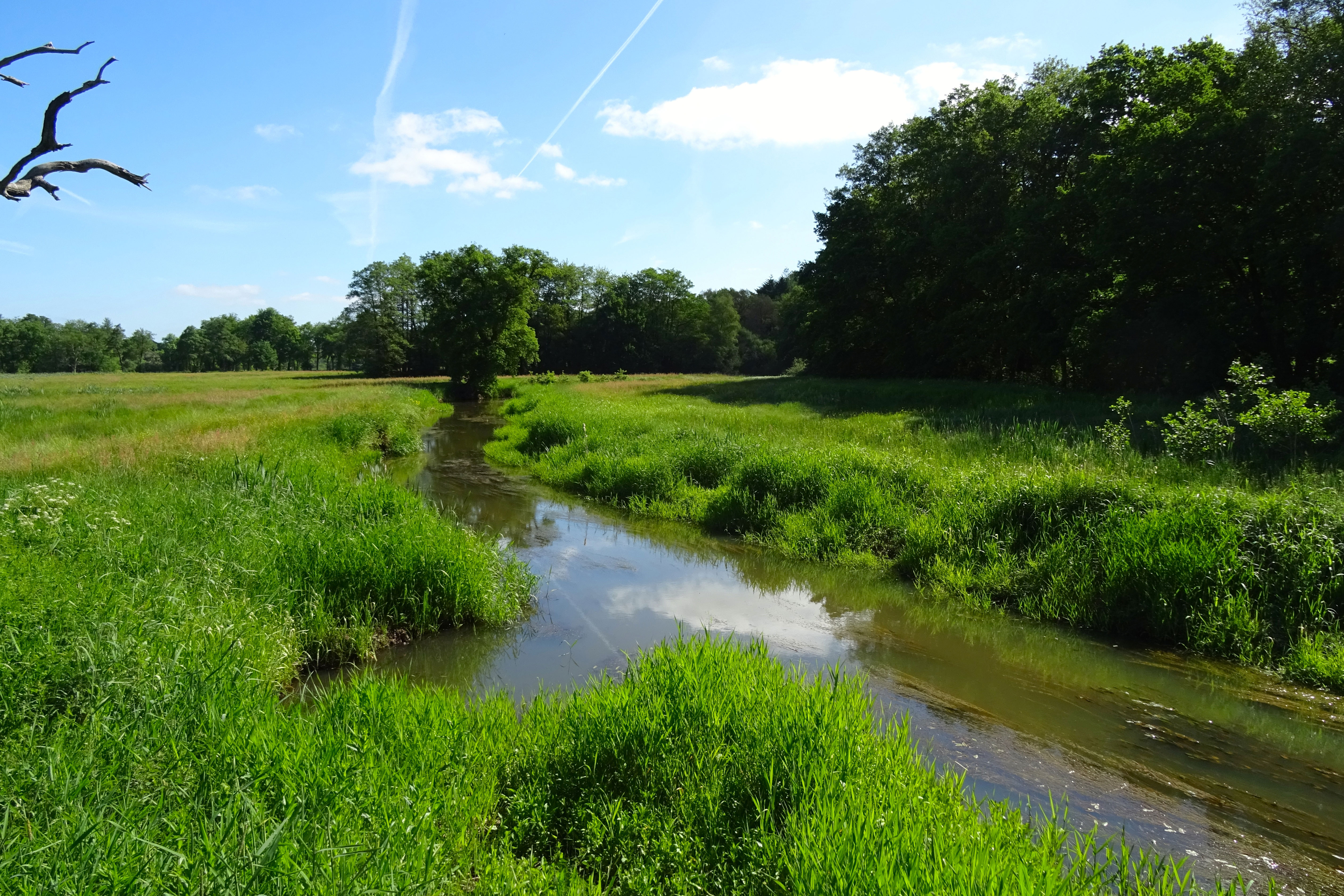
Drentsche Aa National Park

Drenthe is situated at 52°55′N 6°35′E in the northeast of the Netherlands; with to the north the province Groningen, to the west the province Friesland, to the south the province Overijssel, and to the east the German districts Emsland and Bentheim in the state Lower Saxony.

Drenthe is the 9th largest province of the Netherlands. It has a total area of 2,683 km^{2} (1,036 sq mi), with 2,639 km^{2} (1,019 sq mi) of land and 44 km^{2} (17 sq mi) of water. About 72% of the land or 1,898 km^{2} (733 sq mi) is used for agriculture.

Drenthe has several heathlands and no significant rivers or lakes. The national parks Drents-Friese Wold and Dwingelderveld (IUCN category II) and the national landscape Drentsche Aa (IUCN category V) are all (partially) located in the province.

The major urban centers of the province are the capital Assen in the north and Emmen, Meppel, Hoogeveen, and Coevorden in the south.

=== Climate ===
Drenthe has an oceanic climate (Köppen climate classification: Cfb).

Climate data for Groningen Airport Eelde (53°08′N 06°35′E)
Month	Jan	Feb	Mar	Apr	May	Jun	Jul	Aug	Sep	Oct	Nov	Dec	Year
Record high °C (°F)	14.5 (58.1)	15.2 (59.4)	22.7 (72.9)	27.7 (81.9)	31.5 (88.7)	33.5 (92.3)	33.1 (91.6)	34.7 (94.5)	30.5 (86.9)	24.8 (76.6)	17.4 (63.3)	15.4 (59.7)	34.7 (94.5)
Mean daily maximum °C (°F)	4.7 (40.5)	5.4 (41.7)	9.0 (48.2)	13.4 (56.1)	17.4 (63.3)	19.9 (67.8)	22.2 (72.0)	22.1 (71.8)	18.6 (65.5)	13.9 (57.0)	8.7 (47.7)	5.2 (41.4)	13.4 (56.1)
Daily mean °C (°F)	2.4 (36.3)	2.4 (36.3)	5.2 (41.4)	8.4 (47.1)	12.3 (54.1)	14.9 (58.8)	17.1 (62.8)	16.9 (62.4)	13.8 (56.8)	10.0 (50.0)	6.0 (42.8)	2.9 (37.2)	9.3 (48.7)
Mean daily minimum °C (°F)	−0.4 (31.3)	−0.6 (30.9)	1.4 (34.5)	3.4 (38.1)	6.9 (44.4)	9.5 (49.1)	11.9 (53.4)	11.6 (52.9)	9.3 (48.7)	6.2 (43.2)	2.9 (37.2)	0.1 (32.2)	5.2 (41.4)
Record low °C (°F)	−22.0 (−7.6)	−16.5 (2.3)	−13.2 (8.2)	−6.5 (20.3)	−2.3 (27.9)	0.1 (32.2)	4.1 (39.4)	3.2 (37.8)	0.8 (33.4)	−6.4 (20.5)	−13.6 (7.5)	−15.4 (4.3)	−22.0 (−7.6)
Average precipitation mm (inches)	74.2 (2.92)	51.4 (2.02)	64.3 (2.53)	42.1 (1.66)	58.0 (2.28)	71.2 (2.80)	79.4 (3.13)	70.9 (2.79)	78.3 (3.08)	74.0 (2.91)	75.0 (2.95)	73.4 (2.89)	812.1 (31.97)
Average rainy days	20	16	20	17	18	19	20	20	19	20	22	20	230
Average snowy days	8	7	5	2	0	—	—	—	—	0	3	6	33
Average relative humidity (%)	90	88	85	79	79	81	82	83	86	89	91	92	86
Mean monthly sunshine hours	54.2	78.7	117.2	171.6	210.0	187.0	199.1	183.9	137.0	107.2	56.5	47.5	1,550
Percentage possible sunshine	21	29	32	41	43	37	39	40	36	33	22	20	35
Source: Royal Netherlands Meteorological Institute

== Subdivisions ==
The province (Nomenclature of Territorial Units for Statistics or NUTS level 2) is divided into three COROP regions (NUTS level 3): North Drenthe, Southeast Drenthe, and Southwest Drenthe. The COROP regions are used for statistical purposes.

The Netherlands underwent a large number of municipal mergers in the past decades and Drenthe was no exception. The most significant simultaneous set of mergers took place in 1998, when 32 municipalities were amalgamated into 10 larger municipalities. As of 2014 Drenthe consists of 12 municipalities; Emmen is the largest municipality in terms of both population and area, Westerveld is the least populous and Meppel covers the smallest area.

The municipalities Assen, Noordenveld, and Tynaarlo are part of the interprovincial Groningen-Assen Region and the municipalities Aa en Hunze, Assen, Borger-Odoorn, Coevorden, Emmen, Midden-Drenthe, Noordenveld, and Westerveld are part of the international Ems Dollart Region (EDR).

Municipality	Population	Population density	Total area	COROP group
Aa en Hunze	25,333	93 /km^{2} (241 /sq mi)	278.88 km^{2} (107.68 sq mi)	North Drenthe
Assen	67,209	820 /km^{2} (2,124 /sq mi)	83.45 km^{2} (32.22 sq mi)	North Drenthe
Borger-Odoorn	25,633	94 /km^{2} (243 /sq mi)	277.89 km^{2} (107.29 sq mi)	South East Drenthe
Coevorden	35,771	121 /km^{2} (313 /sq mi)	299.69 km^{2} (115.71 sq mi)	South East Drenthe
Emmen	108,003	324 /km^{2} (839 /sq mi)	346.25 km^{2} (133.69 sq mi)	South East Drenthe
Hoogeveen	54,680	430 /km^{2} (1,114 /sq mi)	129.25 km^{2} (49.9 sq mi)	South West Drenthe
Meppel	32,875	585 /km^{2} (1,515 /sq mi)	57.03 km^{2} (22.02 sq mi)	South West Drenthe
Midden-Drenthe	33,368	98 /km^{2} (254 /sq mi)	345.87 km^{2} (133.54 sq mi)	North Drenthe
Noordenveld	31,110	154 /km^{2} (399 /sq mi)	205.32 km^{2} (79.27 sq mi)	North Drenthe
Tynaarlo	32,506	225 /km^{2} (583 /sq mi)	147.7 km^{2} (57.03 sq mi)	North Drenthe
Westerveld	18,902	69 /km^{2} (179 /sq mi)	282.74 km^{2} (109.17 sq mi)	South West Drenthe
De Wolden	23,592	106 /km^{2} (275 /sq mi)	226.35 km^{2} (87.39 sq mi)	South West Drenthe

== Demographics ==
Historical population
Year	Pop.	±%
1899	148,544	—
1930	222,432	+49.7%
1960	311,196	+39.9%
1970	366,590	+17.8%
1980	418,479	+14.2%
1990	441,028	+5.4%
2000	469,806	+6.5%
2010	490,981	+4.5%
2020	493,682	+0.6%
Source: CBS

On 1 January 2023, Drenthe had a total population of 502,051 and a population density of 191/km^{2} (490/sq mi). It is the 3rd least populous and least densely populated province of the Netherlands, with only Flevoland and Zeeland having fewer people. Emmen is the most populous municipality in the province.

== Religion ==
In 2015, 23.8% of the population belonged to the Protestant Church in the Netherlands while 9.3% was Roman Catholic, 0.9% was Muslim and 3.6% belonged to other churches or faiths. Over half (62.4%) of the population identified as non-religious.

Religion in Drenthe (2015)
1. Not religious (62.4%)
2. Protestant Church in the Netherlands (23.8%)
3. Catholicism (9.30%)
4. Other (3.60%)
5. Islam (0.90%)

== Economy ==
Agriculture is an important employer, although industrial areas are found near the cities. The quietness of the province is also attracting a growing number of tourists.

Drenthe is known as the "Cycling Province" of the Netherlands and is an exceptional place for a cycling holiday, having hundreds of kilometers of cycle paths through forest, heath and along canals and many towns and villages offering refreshment along the way. Drenthe exports through the entire Netherlands and also receives supplies and goods from Germany, making it a good business district. Many Dutch and German multinational companies are settled in Drenthe.

The gross domestic product (GDP) of the province was 15.1 billion € in 2018, accounting for 1.9% of the Netherlands economic output. GDP per capita adjusted for purchasing power was 26,700 € or 89% of the EU27 average in the same year.

== Culture ==
=== Language ===
Over half the population of Drenthe speaks the Drents dialect. Each town or village has its own version. All versions are part of the Low Saxon language group. Dutch Low Saxon has been officially recognised by the Dutch government as a regional language and is protected by the European Charter for Regional or Minority Languages.

=== Sports ===
FC Emmen is the only professional football club in Drenthe. It plays in the Keuken Kampioen Divisie and its home stadium is De Oude Meerdijk.

The Ronde van Drenthe is an elite men's and women's professional road bicycle race that takes place annually in early March.

The TT Circuit Assen hosts the Dutch TT, which is a round of the MotoGP series of the Motorcycle Road Racing World Championship.

=== Museums ===
Drents Museum is an art and history museum in Assen. It had 227,000 visitors in 2013.

Museum Collectie Brands is a local museum located in Nieuw-Dordrecht that houses an extensive collection of rare and curious items collected by Jans Brands.

== Politics ==
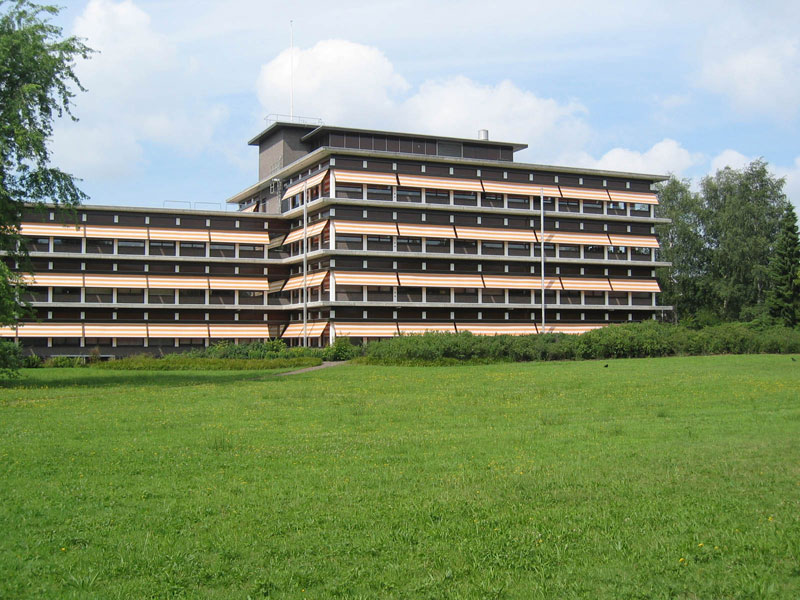
Seat of the provincial government in Assen

The States of Drenthe have 43 seats, and is headed by the King's Commissioner, currently Agnes Mulder. While the provincial council is elected by the people of Drenthe, the Commissioner is appointed by the King and the cabinet of the Netherlands. The daily affairs of the province are taken care of by the Gedeputeerde Staten, which are also headed by the Commissioner; its members (gedeputeerden) can be compared with ministers.

Provincial election results
	2023		
Party	Votes	%	Seats
Farmer–Citizen Movement	88,176	33.41	17
Labour Party	24,861	9.42	4
People's Party for Freedom and Democracy	20,434	7.74	4
Christian Democratic Appeal	15,563	5.90	3
GroenLinks	14,756	5.59	2
Party for Freedom	13,681	5.18	2
ChristianUnion	12,803	4.85	2
Socialist Party	12,534	4.75	2
Party for the Animals	11,167	4.23	2
Democrats 66	9,981	3.78	1
Forum for Democracy	7,888	2.99	1
Volt	7,734	2.93	1
Strong Local Drenthe	7,485	2.84	1
JA21	6,368	2.41	1
All other parties	10,451	3.96	0
Total valid votes	263,882	100.00	43
Invalid/blank votes	1,155	0.44	
Total	265,037		
Registered voters/turnout	399,405	66.36	
Source: Kiesraad

== Transportation ==
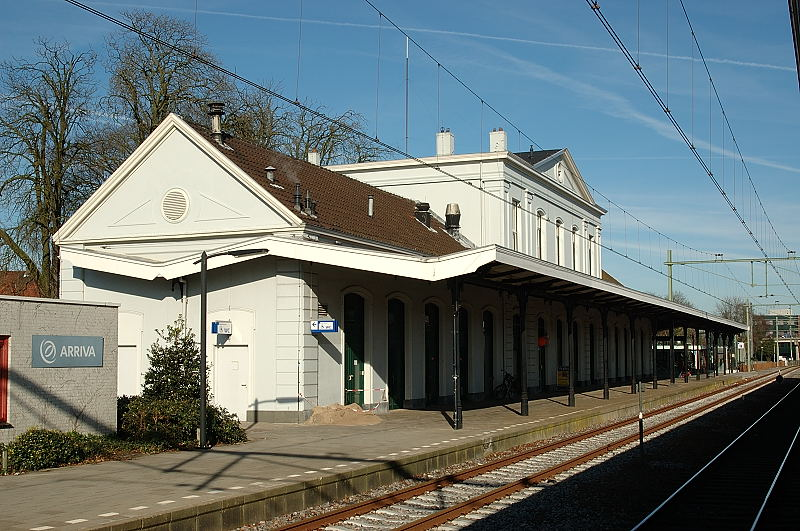
The Meppel railway station is a national heritage site

The motorways A28 (E232), A32, A37 (E233), and the other major roads N33, N34, and N48 are maintained by the state.

There are four railways partially in the province of Drenthe:

Trajectory	Railway stations in Drenthe
Arnhem–Leeuwarden	Overijssel – Meppel – Friesland
Gronau–Coevorden	Germany – Coevorden
Meppel–Groningen	Meppel – Hoogeveen – Beilen – Assen – Groningen
Zwolle–Emmen	Overijssel – Coevorden – Dalen – Nieuw Amsterdam – Emmen Zuid – Emmen

Groningen Airport Eelde is a minor international airport located in Eelde in the province of Drenthe. Hoogeveen Airport is a general aviation airport located in Hoogeveen.

== Science and education ==
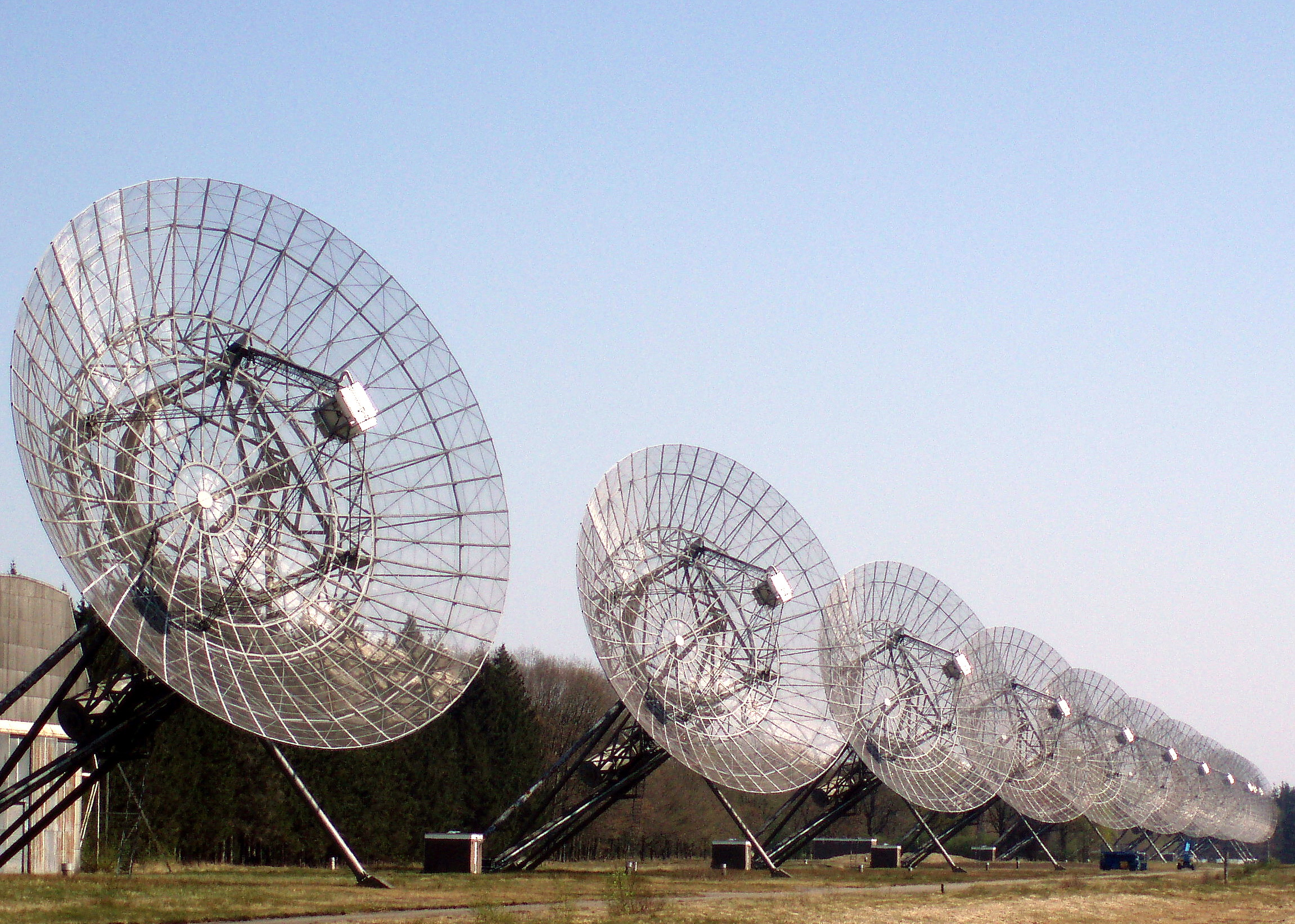
Westerbork Synthesis Radio Telescope

ASTRON, the Netherlands institute for radio astronomy, is located near Dwingeloo. Their single-dish radio telescope of the Dwingeloo Radio Observatory was completed in 1956 and is now a national heritage site (rijksmonument). Their Westerbork Synthesis Radio Telescope is an array of fourteen dishes near the village of Westerbork and construction was completed in 1970. Their international Low-Frequency Array with its core near Exloo was completed in 2012.

In Assen, Emmen, and Meppel are universities of applied sciences (hogescholen). The Stenden University of Applied Sciences has locations in these three towns, which formed the Drenthe University of Applied Sciences before a merger in 2008. The Hanze Institute of Technology, part of the Hanze University of Applied Sciences, is located in Assen. There are no research universities (universiteiten) in the province of Drenthe.

== Media ==
RTV Drenthe, the regional radio and television station, is based in Assen. The regional daily newspaper for the provinces of Drenthe and Groningen is Dagblad van het Noorden, which is based in the city of Groningen.

== See also ==
- Hunze
