= Atlantic mixed forests =

Ecoregion in Europe

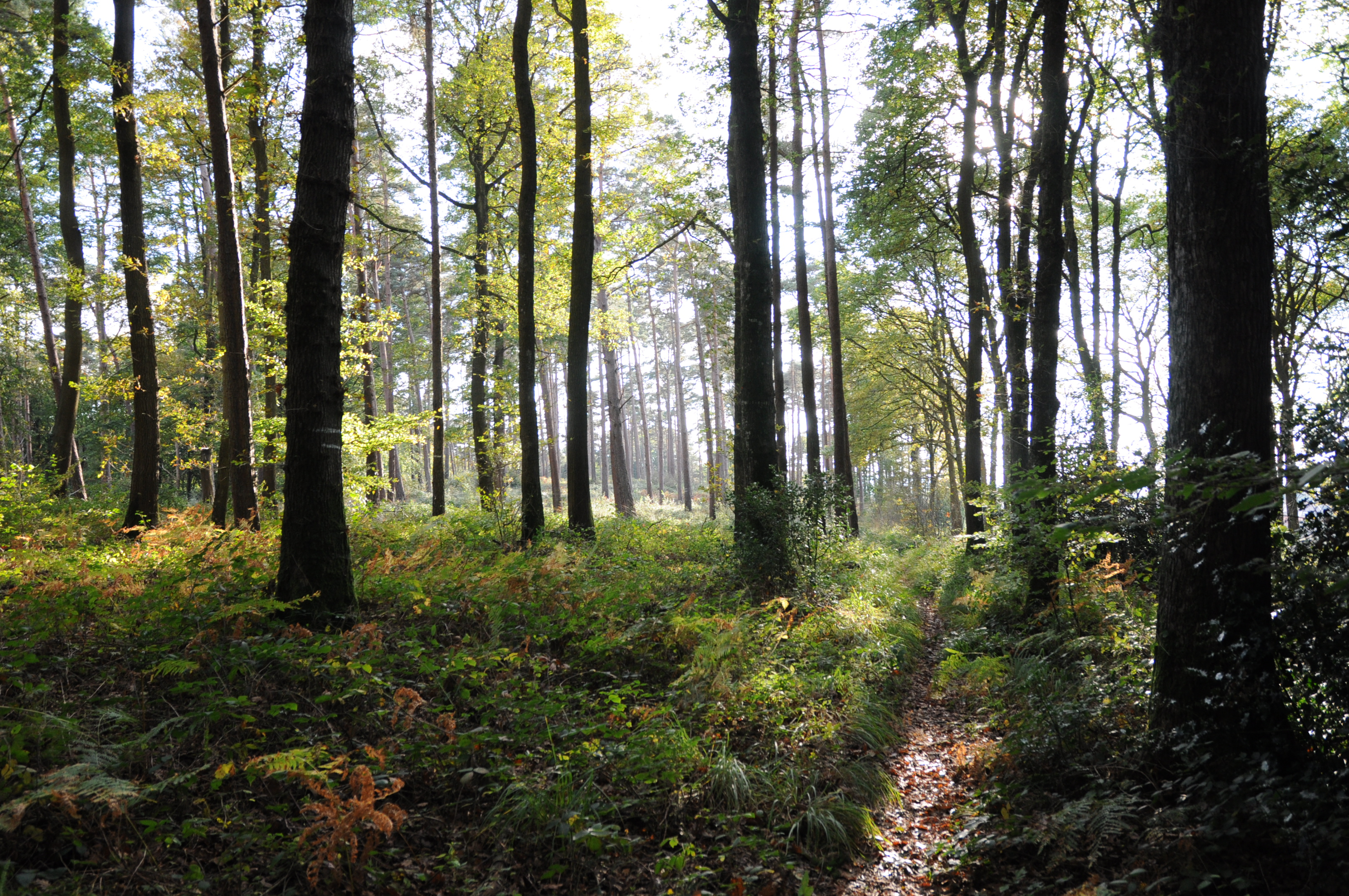
- Forest Domaniale de Desvres, France

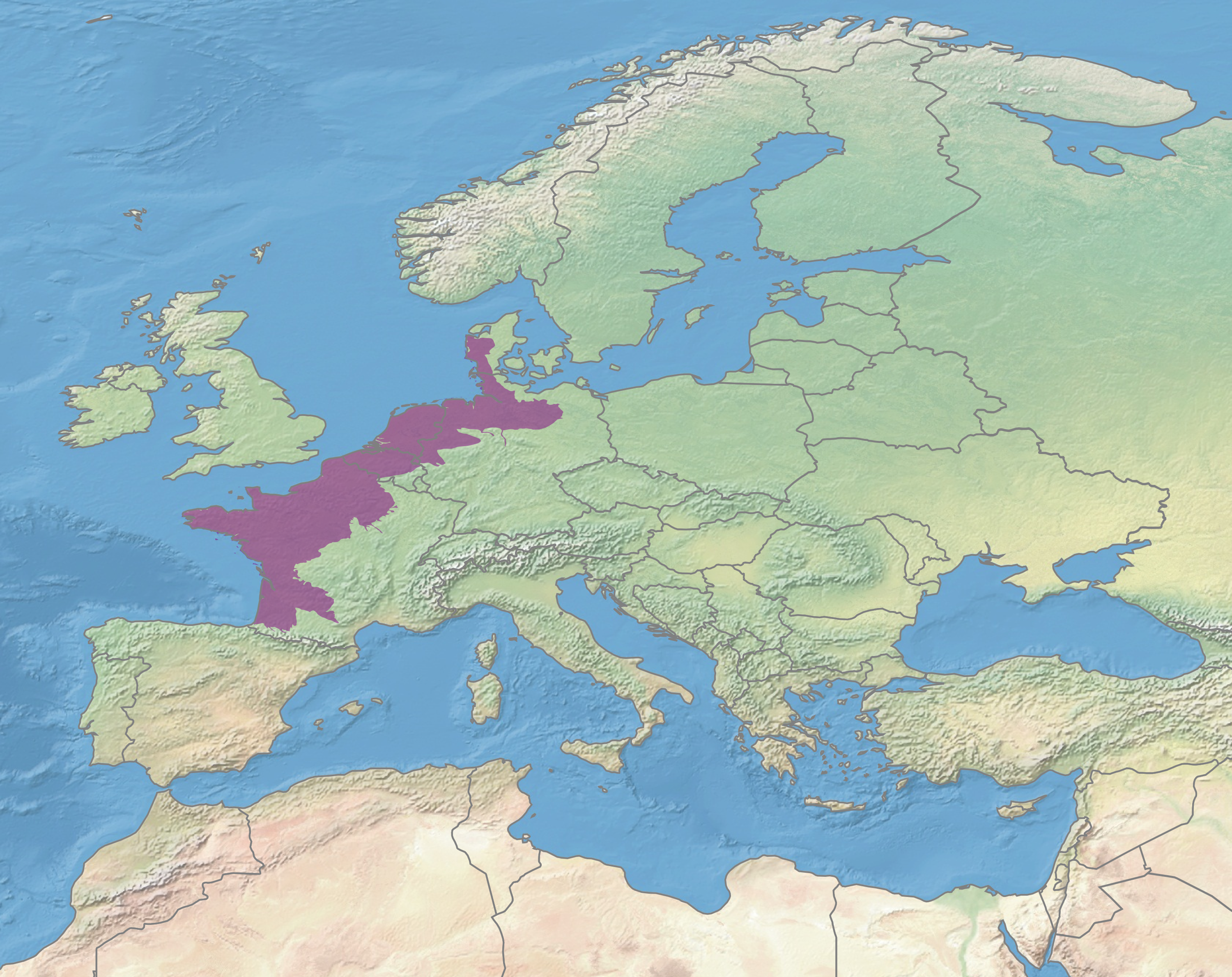
- Location of the ecoregion (in purple)

Ecology
- Realm: Palearctic
- Biome: temperate broadleaf and mixed forests
- Borders: List: Alps conifer and mixed forests; Baltic mixed forests; Cantabrian mixed forests; Central European mixed forests; Pyrenees conifer and mixed forests; Western European broadleaf forests

Geography
- Area: 380,246 km^{2} (146,814 mi^{2})
- Countries: List: Belgium; Denmark; France; Germany; Netherlands

Conservation
- Conservation status: critical/endangered
- Protected: 59,657 km^{2} (16%)

The Atlantic mixed forests is a terrestrial ecoregion in western Europe. It extends along the western edge of continental Europe, from southwestern France through northern France, Belgium, the Netherlands, northwestern Germany, and western Denmark. Most of the region's forests and dunes have been converted to fields, pastures, and forest plantations, and its once-extensive wetlands have mostly been drained and filled.

== Geography ==
The ecoregion covers an area of 380,246 km^{2}. The terrain is generally flat or gently rolling, except in Brittany where the terrain is hilly and the coast is rocky. In several places, notably the Landes forest in southwestern France, dunes extended inland for miles from the shore.

== Climate ==
The climate is temperate and maritime.

== Flora ==
Mixed oak forests are typical, with Quercus robur, Betula pendula and Betula pubescens prevalent on acidic soils, and Q. robur and Fagus sylvatica on other soils. In the southern portion of the ecoregion Quercus petraea and Q. pubescens are also present. In the northern part of the ecoregion Abies alba also occurs. Pinus pinaster grows naturally on sandy soils, and has been planted extensively to stabilize dunes, along with Pinus sylvestris. Heathlands dominated by Calluna vulgaris, Ulex and Juniperus communis occur in coastal areas subject to wind and salt spray. Substantial areas of the German, Danish and Dutch parts of the ecoregion used to be covered with extensive bogs, which now have been mostly destroyed for agriculture.

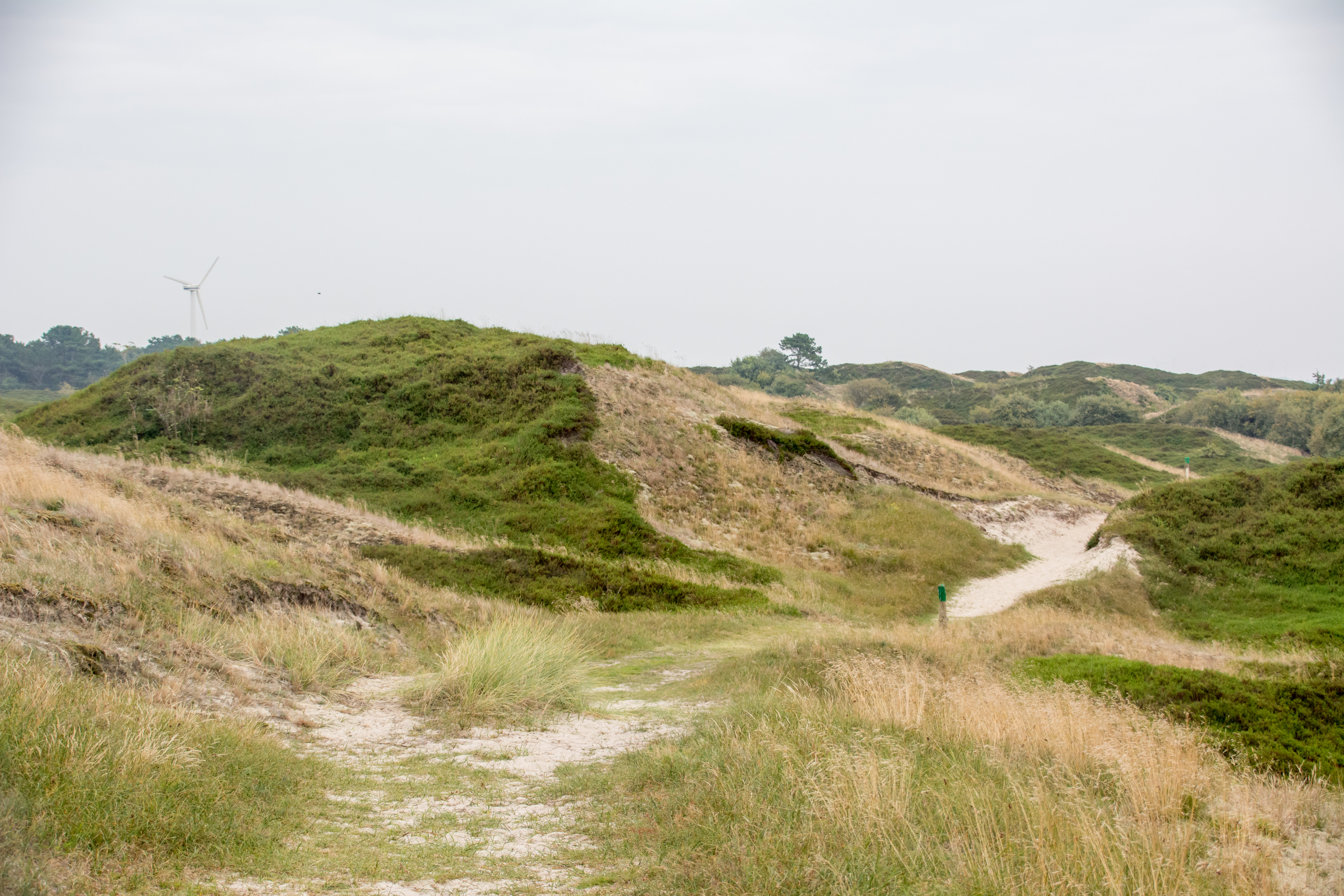
coastal dunes

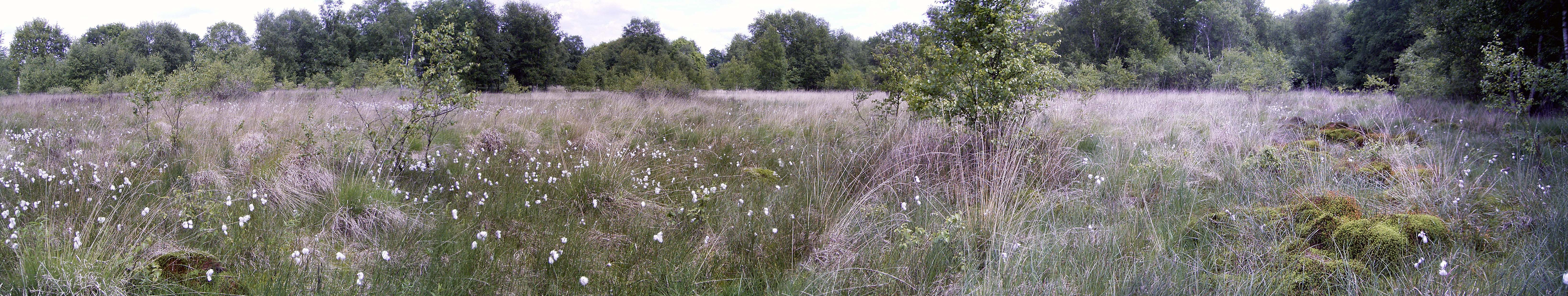
bog

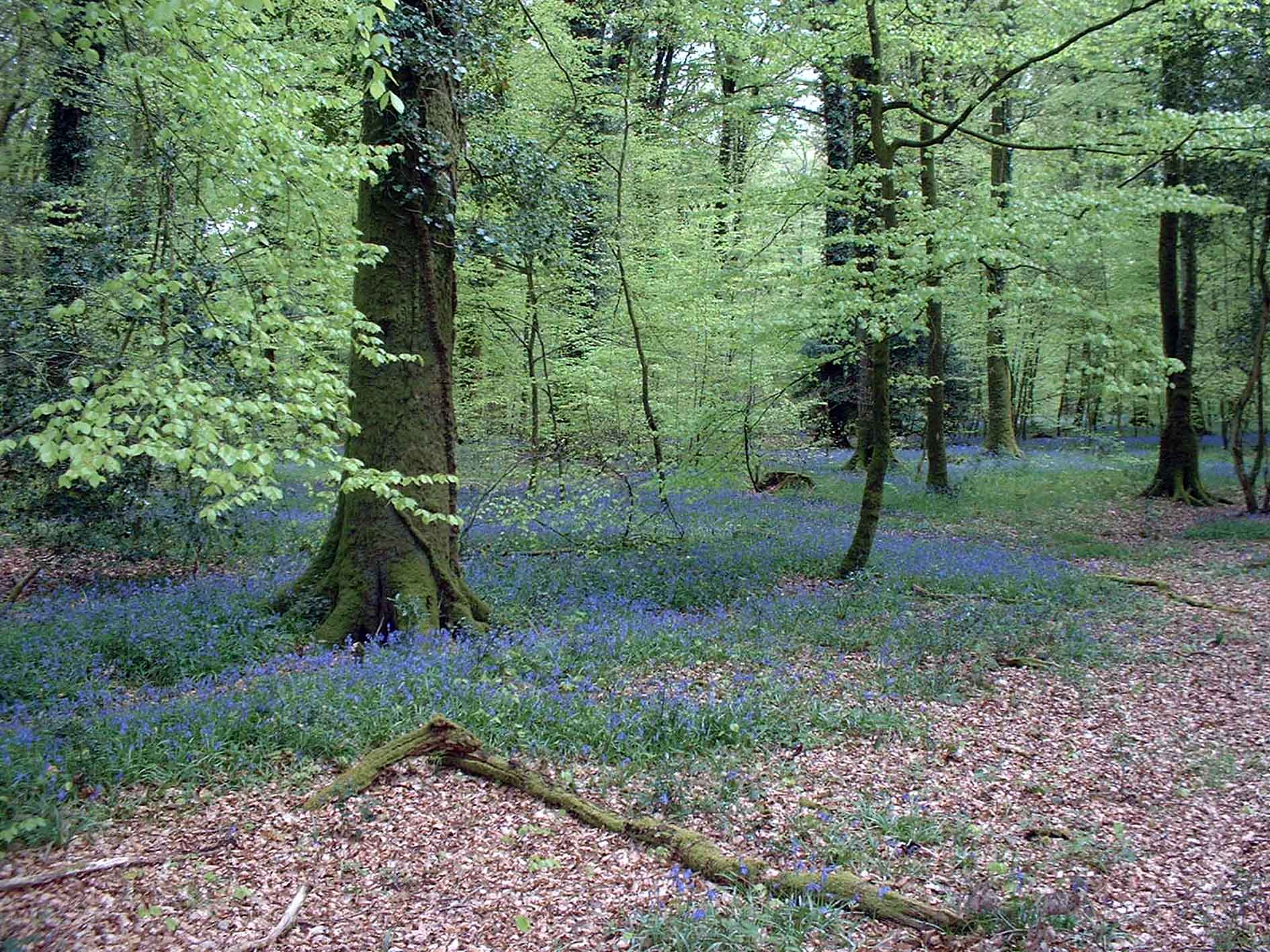
beech forest

== Fauna ==
The original forests hosted a large variety of animals. Large mammals native to the region include red deer, roe deer and wild boar. Wolves and lynx are returning in parts of this region. Wisents are reintroduced as well. Formerly it was also inhabited by brown bears, eurasian elk, and the now globally extinct aurochs. Seasonally, harbor porpoise from the North Sea follow the rivers deeply into the country's interior.

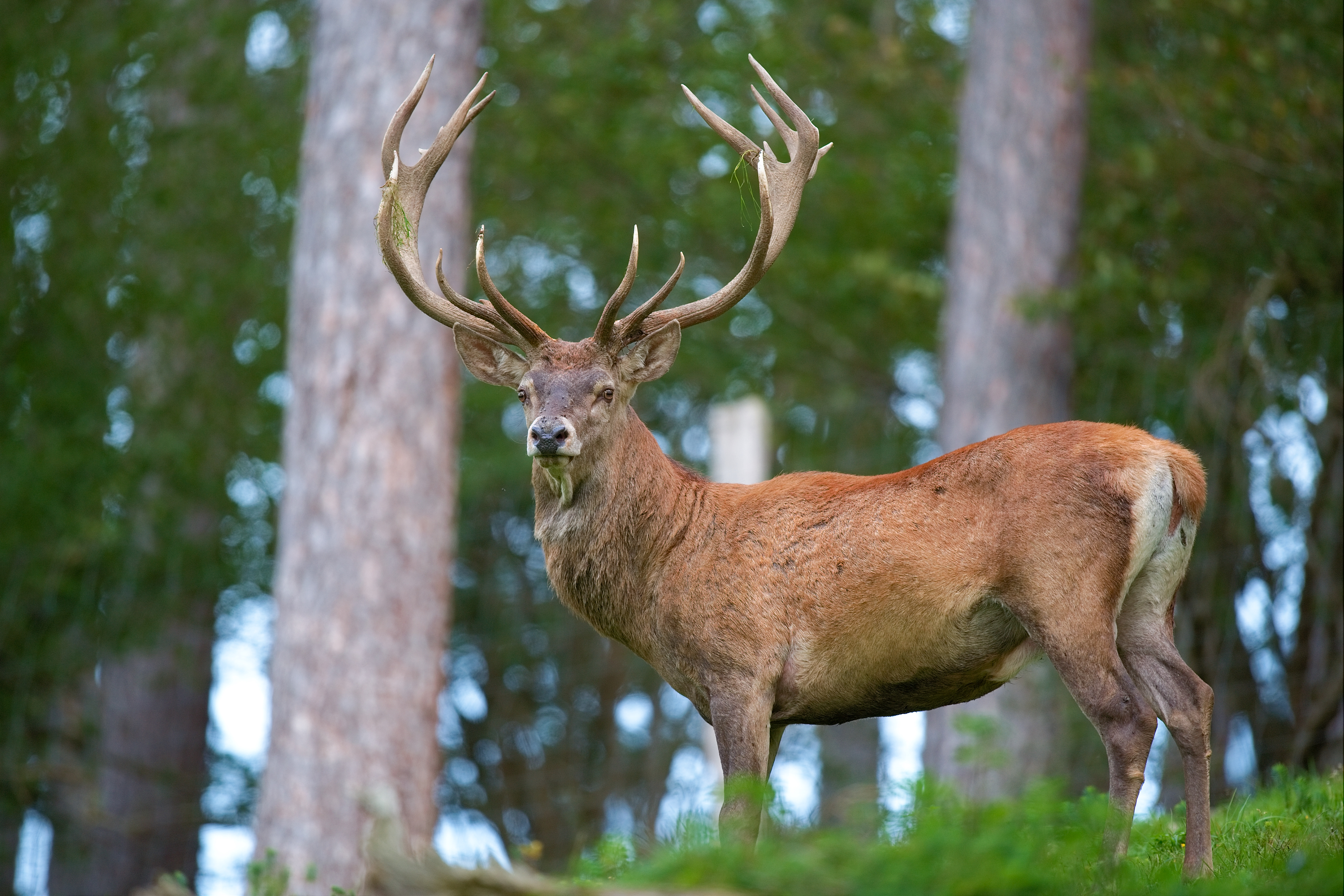
red deer

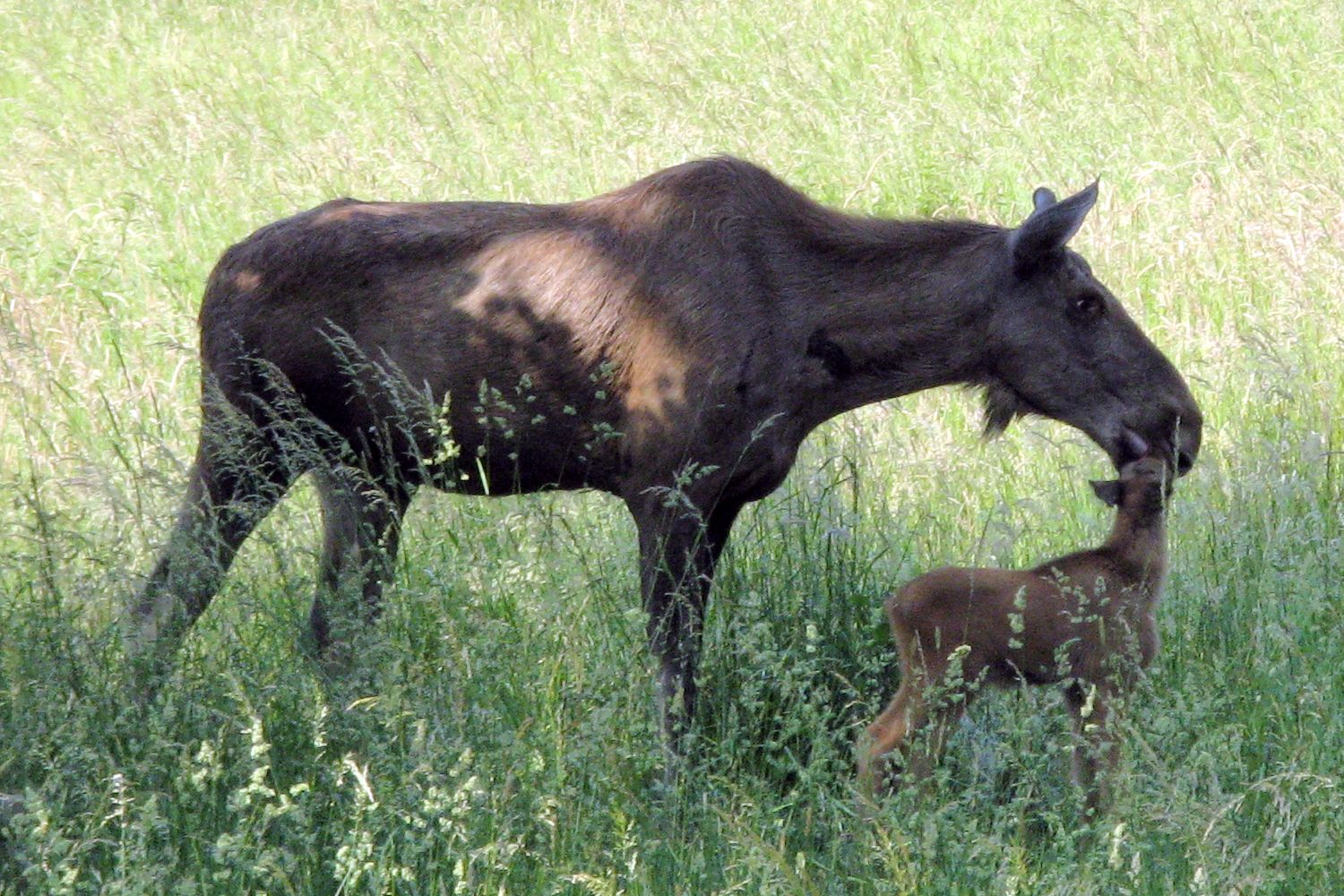
eurasian elk used to occur in the region, but are now extirpated

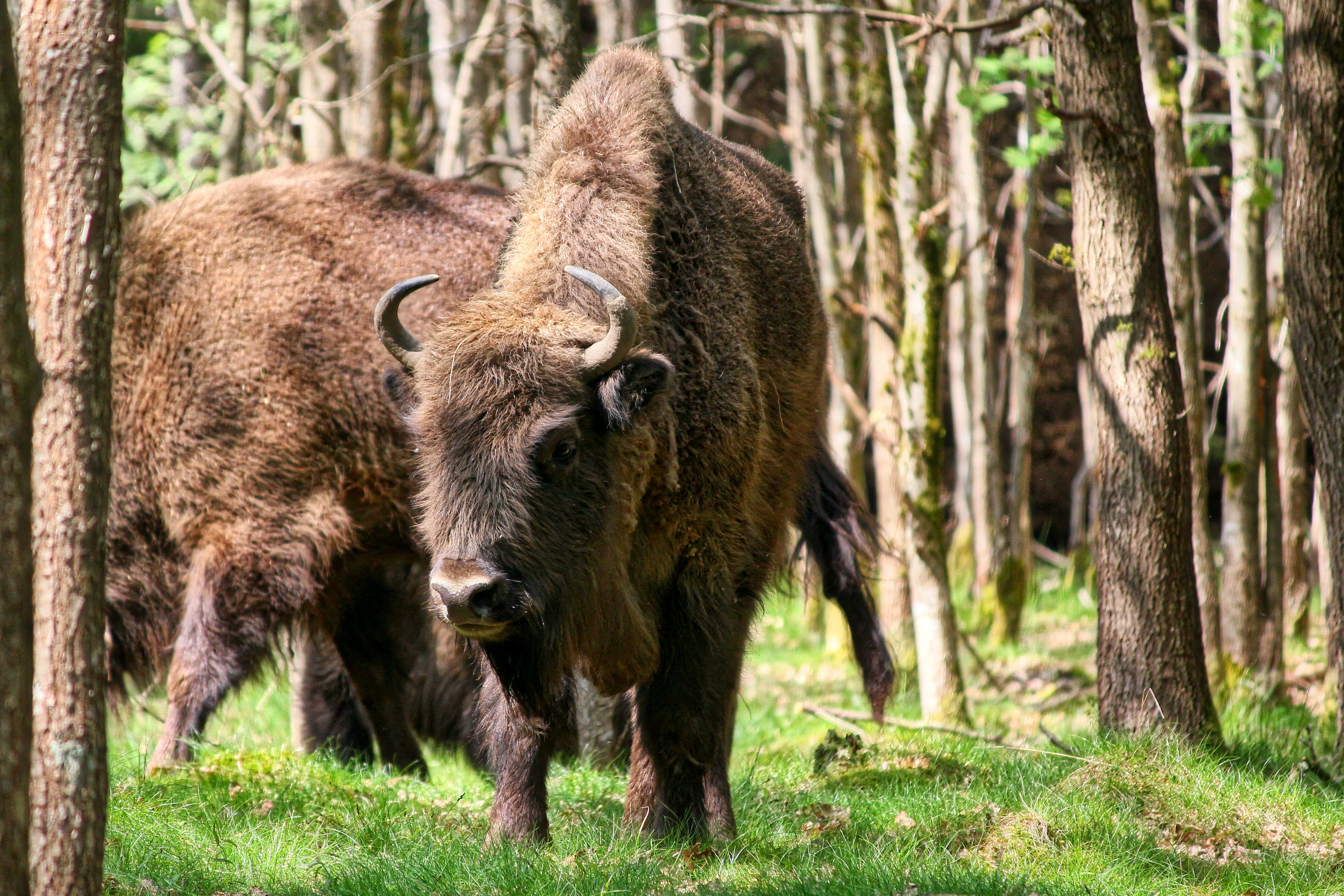
wisent

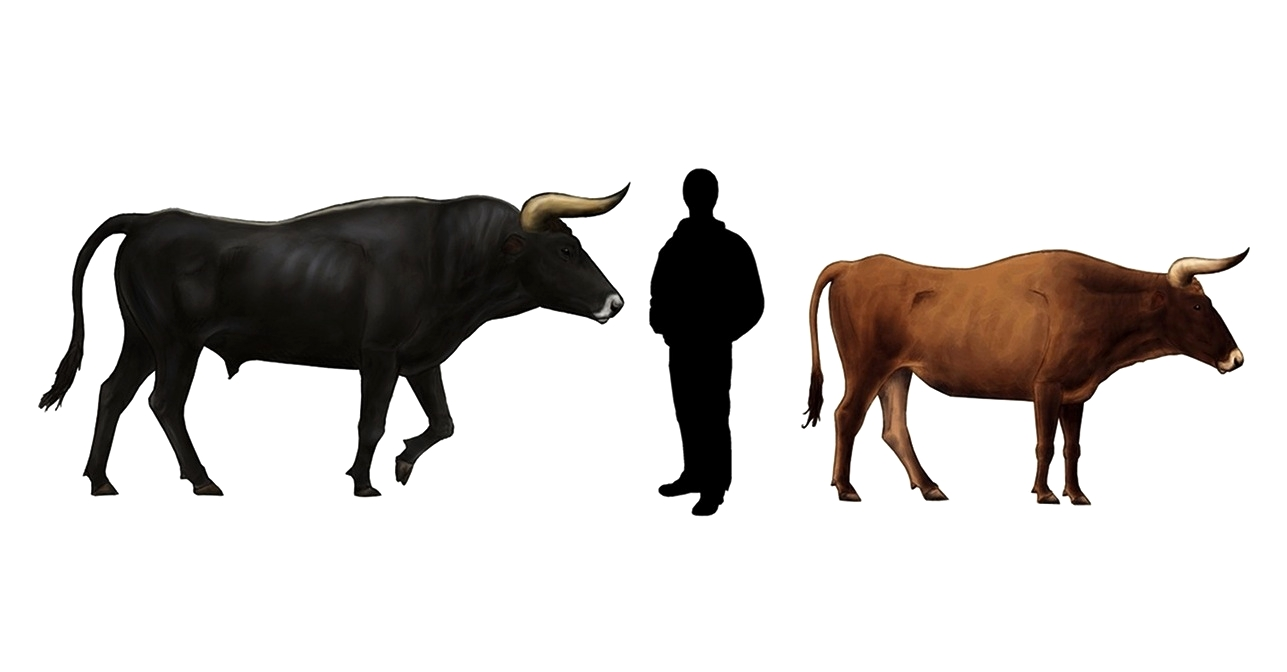
Aurochs are now extinct as a wild species

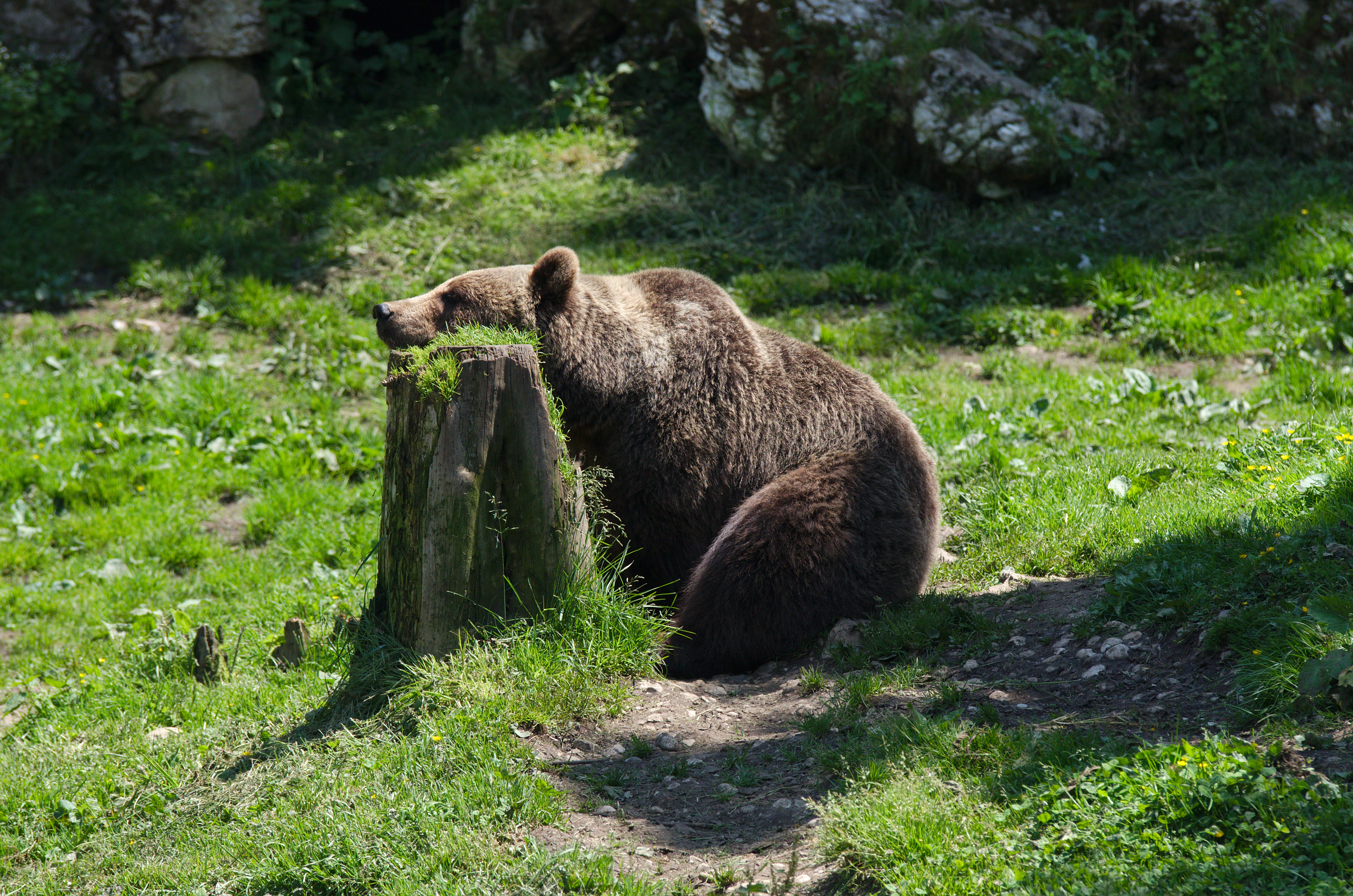
Brown bear

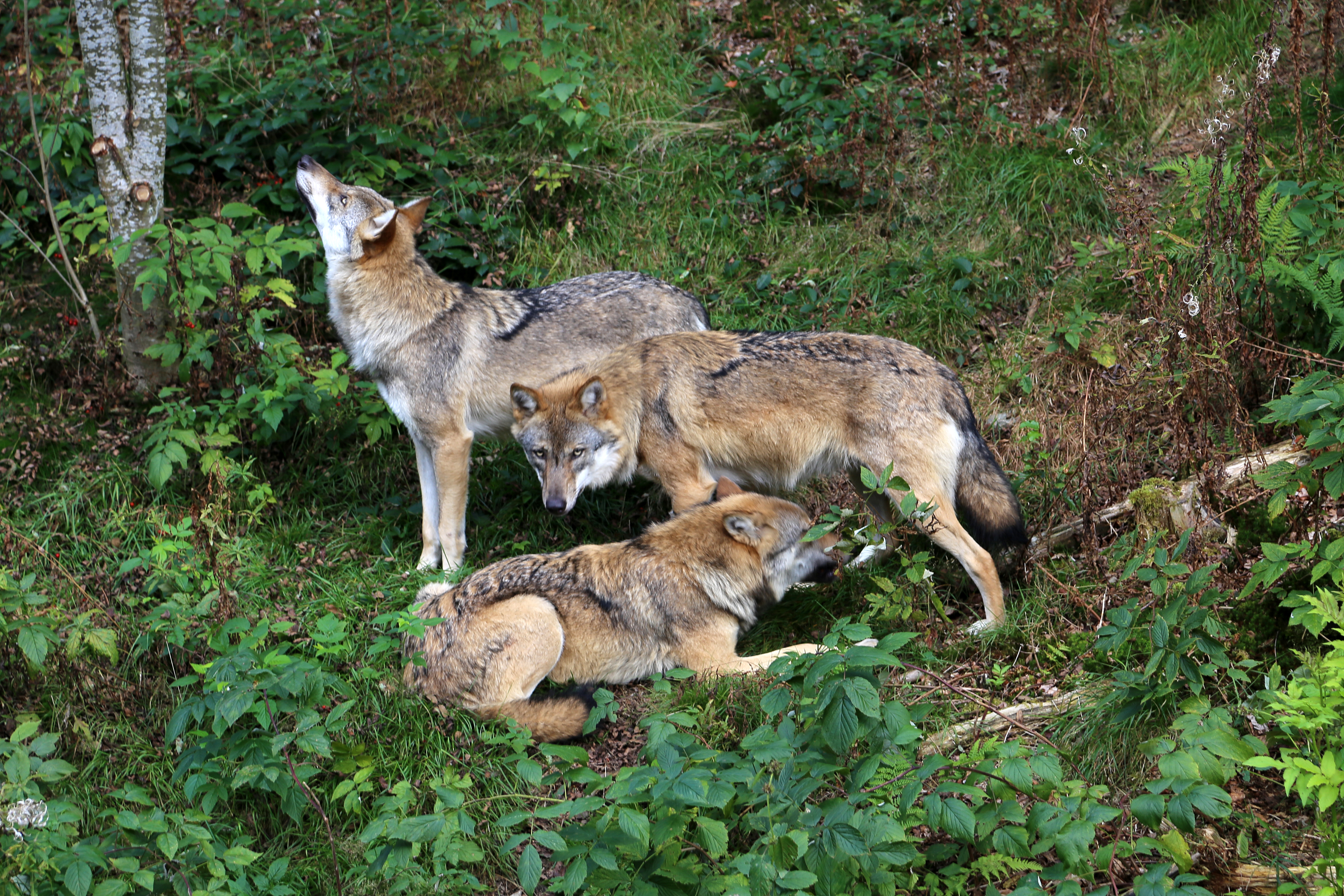
grey wolf

The forests are home to blackbird, blue tit, great tit, common chaffinch, firecrest, black woodpecker, black stork, goshawk, eurasian sparrowhawk, little owl, eagle-owl, among others. The golden eagle used to live here as well, but was exterminated. Mammals, such as pine marten, wood mouse, badger, and European wildcat, call the forests home, as do insects like cockchafer, stag beetle and dor beetle.

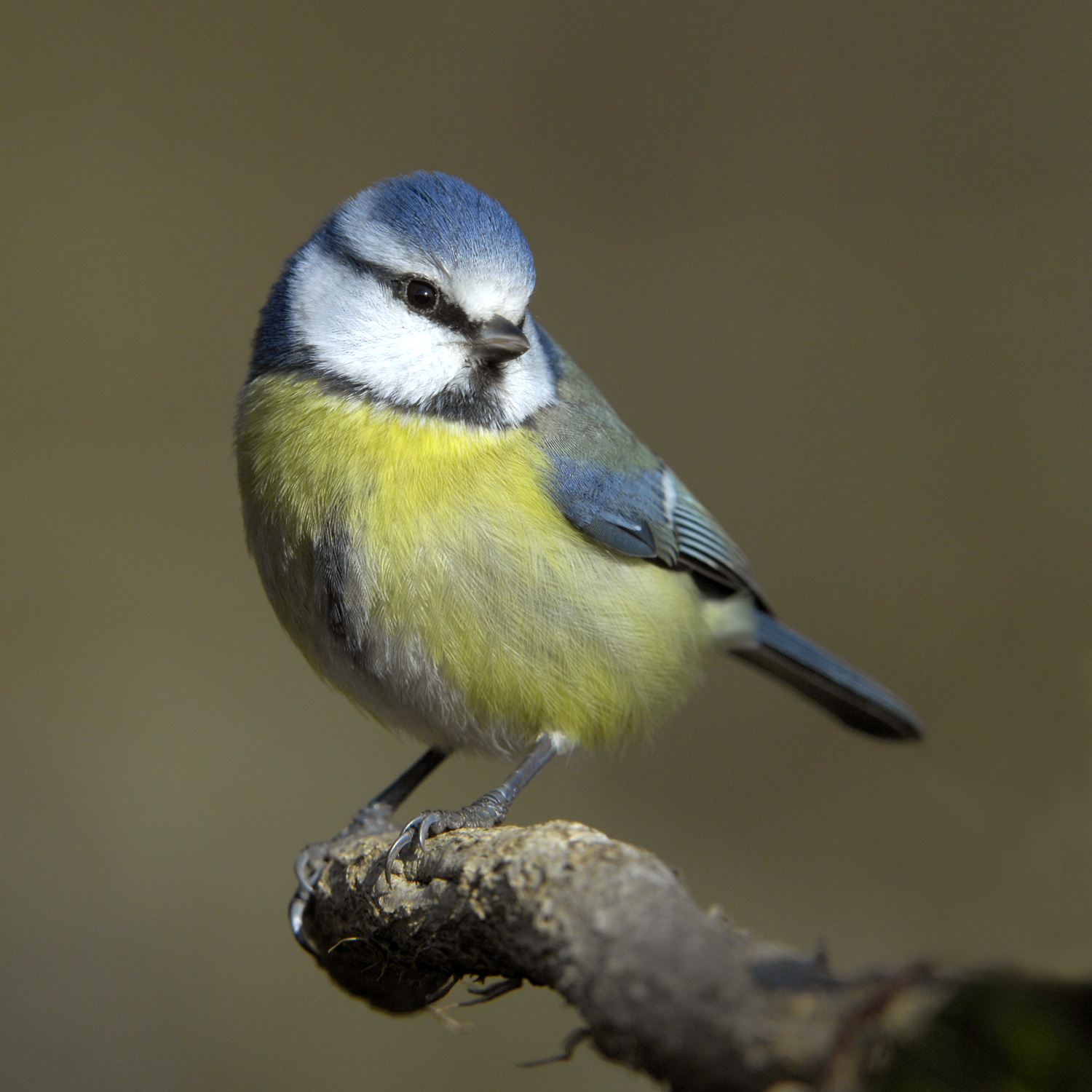
blue tit

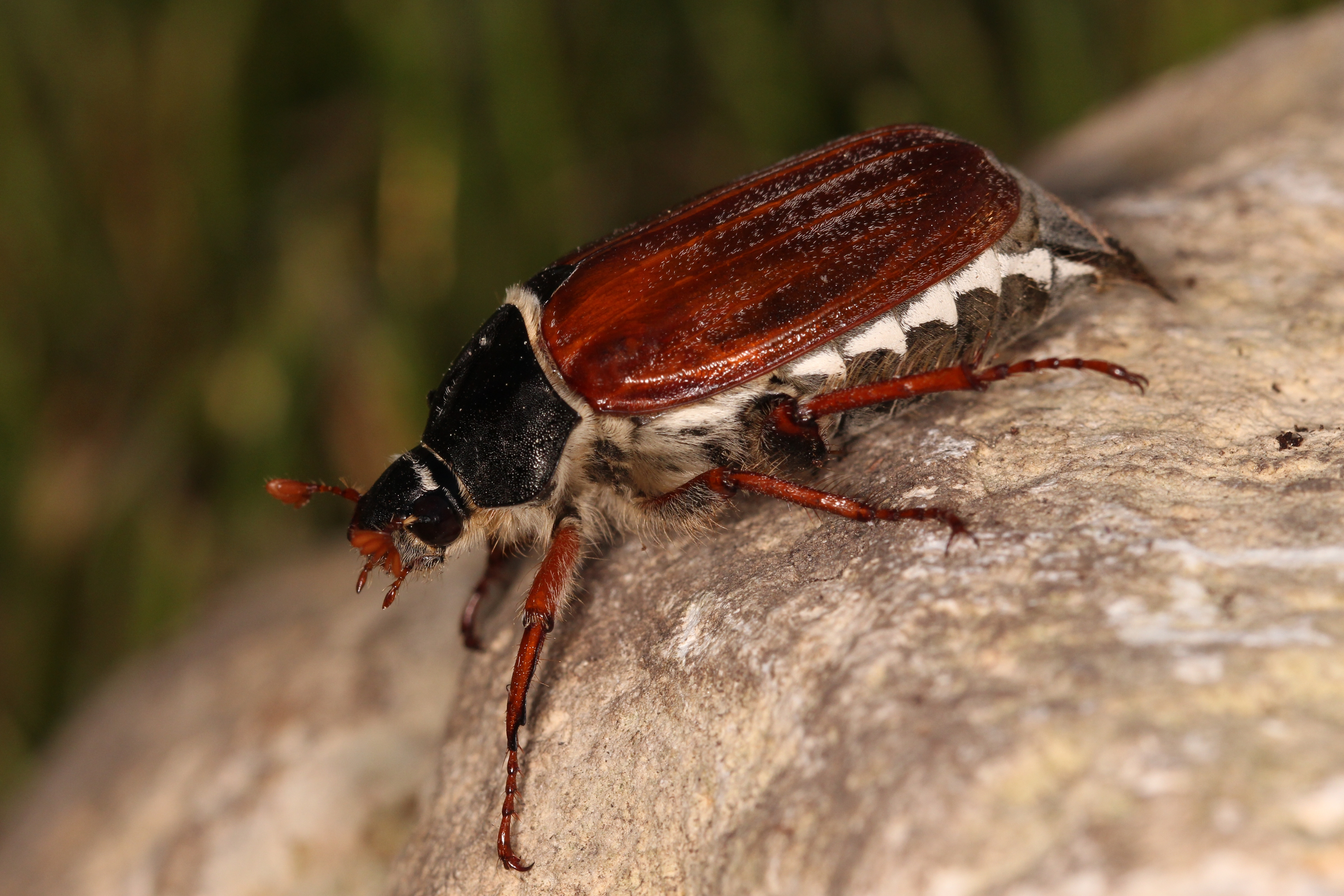

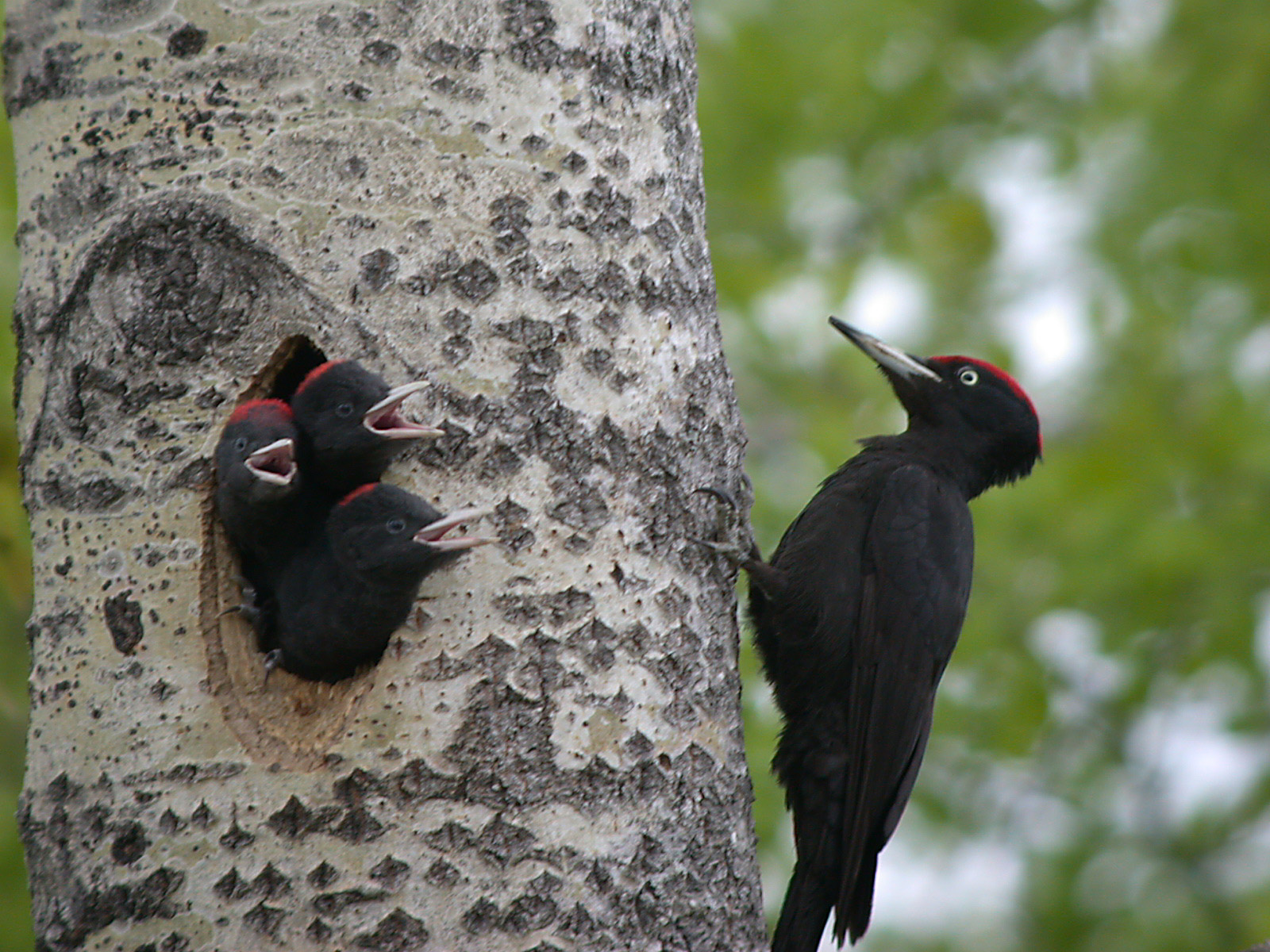
black woodpecker

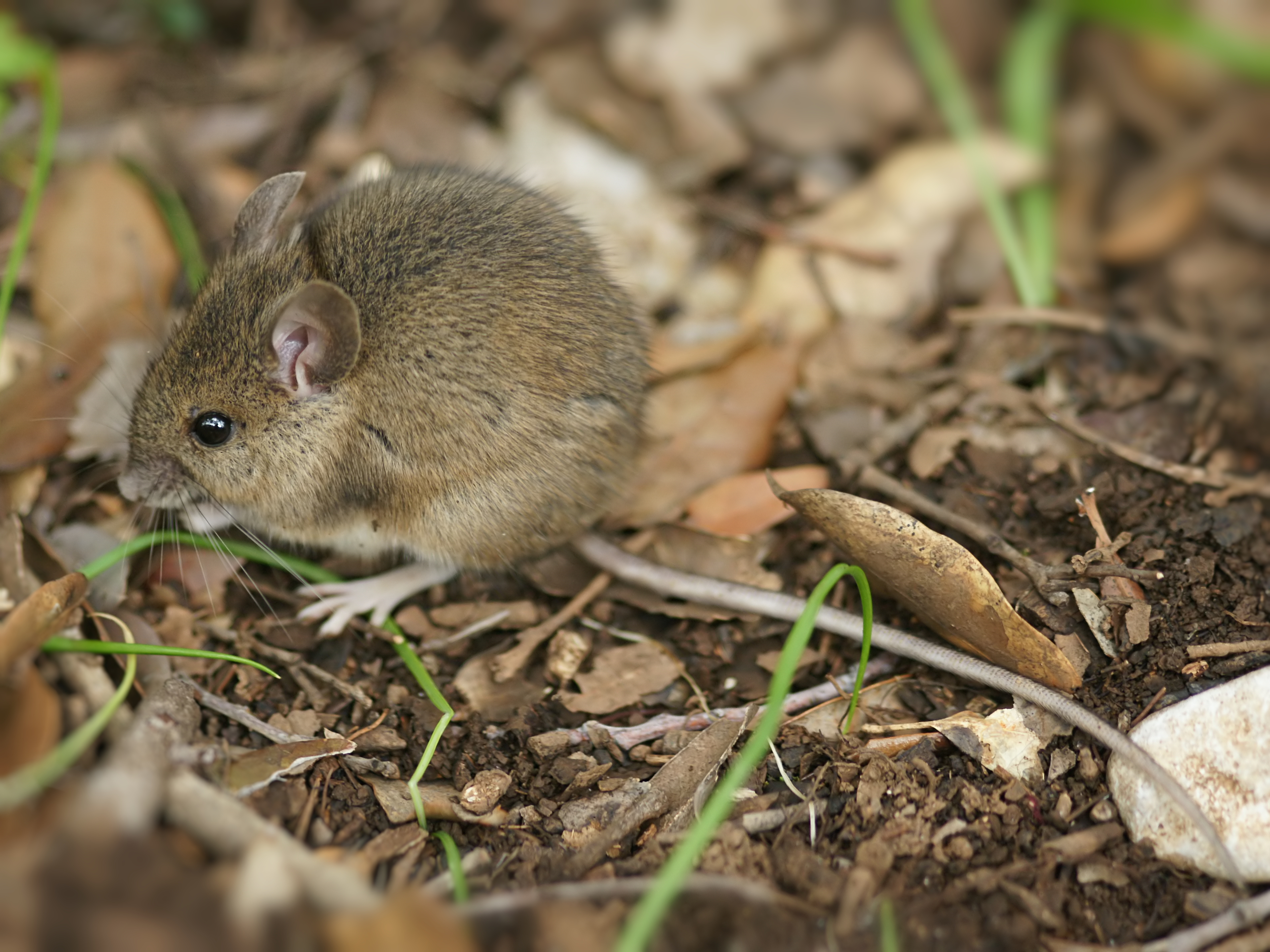
wood mouse

The region's numerous rivers and streams are inhabited by such fish species as northern pike, common roach or bream. Formerly widespread migratory fish, such as Atlantic salmon, sea trout, European sea sturgeon, allis shad and the European eel, are now all endangered due to factors including habitat destruction and fragmentation by hydropower, pollution and foreign disease. Otters and beavers were exterminated, but are now making a comeback. Aquatic invertebrates include the great ramshorn and the endangered freshwater pearl mussel. Examples for birds associated with wetlands, rivers and other bodies of water include white stork, white-tailed eagle, little ringed plover and numerous species of duck, e.g. the mallard.

The Wadden Sea area on the northern coast is important for migratory birds.

The peat bogs in the northern part of the ecoregion have a specialized fauna consisting of insects like Aeshna subarctica, Agonum ericeti, Agriades optilete, amphibians like the moor frog and birds such as common snipe, swamp harrier, golden plover.

Open landscapes such as fields, heaths and meadows, whose extent was probably expanded by anthropogenic deforestation following the introduction of farming to the region, are the preferred habitat of species such as grey partridge, red kite and European hare. Many of these species are now endangered due to modernized agricultural practices.

== Protected areas ==
59,657 km^{2}, or 16%, of the ecoregion is in protected areas. Another 19% of the ecoregion's area is forested but unprotected.

In France, the system of regional nature parks preserves biodiversity and sustainable agriculture. Regional nature parks include farms and villages as well as forests, heathlands and wetlands. Regional nature parks in the Atlantic mixed forests include Armorique, Brenne, Boucles de la Seine normande, Caps et Marais d'Opale, Causses du Quercy, Gâtinais français, Haute Vallée de Chevreuse, Landes de Gascogne, Loire-Anjou-Touraine, Marais Du Cotentin Et Du Bessin, Marais poitevin, Montagne de Reims, Oise-Pays de France, Perche, Vallée de la Scarpe et de l'Escaut avesnois, and Vexin français.

Protected areas in the Netherlands include De Alde Feanen, De Biesbosch, De Groote Peel, De Hoge Veluwe, De Loonse en Drunense Duinen, De Maasduinen, De Meinweg, Drents-Friese Wold, Duinen van Texel, Dwingelderveld, Drentsche Aa, Nieuw Land, Oosterschelde, Sallandse Heuvelrug, Schiermonnikoog, Utrechtse Heuvelrug, Veluwezoom, Weerribben-Wieden, and Zuid-Kennemerland national parks.

Lüneburg Heath (Lüneburger Heide) in northern Germany includes area of heathland, bog, and downy oak forest, as well as coppiced woodlands and pine plantations.

== Ecoregion delineation ==
The European Environment Agency's Digital Map of European Ecological Regions (DMEER) designates two Atlantic forest ecoregions – the Northern Temperate Atlantic and Southern Temperate Atlantic. The WWF's system combines them into one Atlantic mixed forests ecoregion, with the same external boundary.
