= List of national parks of the Netherlands =

List of national parks in the Netherlands

National Parks in the Netherlands

In the 1960s, national parks in the Netherlands were defined as areas of at least 10 square kilometres (3.9 sq mi) consisting of natural terrains, water and/or forests, with a special landscape and flora and fauna.

The first two national parks were founded in the 1930s by private organisations. The first official national park, Schiermonnikoog National Park, was not established until 1989. The most recent national park to have been established is the Van Gogh National Park, which was established in 2024.

In 2011, the government decided to make the provinces responsible for the national parks.

As of 2026, there are 22 national parks.

== National parks ==
Name	Province	Size	Established
Lauwersmeer National Park	Groningen, Friesland	6,000 ha	2003
Schiermonnikoog National Park	Friesland	5,400 ha	1989
De Alde Feanen National Park	Friesland	4,000 ha	2006
Drents-Friese Wold National Park	Drenthe, Friesland	6,100 ha	2000
Dwingelderveld National Park	Drenthe	3,700 ha	1991
Drentsche Aa National Park	Drenthe	10,600 ha	2002
Weerribben-Wieden National Park	Overijssel	10,500 ha	1992/2009
Sallandse Heuvelrug National Park	Overijssel	2,740 ha	2004
Veluwezoom National Park	Gelderland	5,000 ha	1930
De Hoge Veluwe National Park	Gelderland	5,400 ha	1935
Utrechtse Heuvelrug National Park	Utrecht	10,000 ha	2003/2013
Duinen van Texel National Park	North Holland	4,300 ha	2002
Zuid-Kennemerland National Park	North Holland	3,800 ha	1995
Oosterschelde National Park	Zeeland	37,000 ha	2002
De Biesbosch National Park	North Brabant, South Holland	7,100 ha	1994
De Zoom–Kalmthoutse Heide Cross-Border Park	North Brabant, Antwerp (Belgium)	3,750 ha	2001
De Loonse en Drunense Duinen National Park	North Brabant	3,400 ha	2002
De Groote Peel National Park	Limburg, North Brabant	1,340 ha	1993
De Maasduinen National Park	Limburg	4,200 ha	1996
De Meinweg National Park	Limburg	1,700 ha	1995
Nieuw Land National Park	Flevoland	28,900 ha	2018
Van Gogh National Park	North Brabant	120,000 ha	2024
