= Van Gogh National Park =

National park in the Netherlands

- Van Gogh Nationaal Park
- IUCN category II (national park)
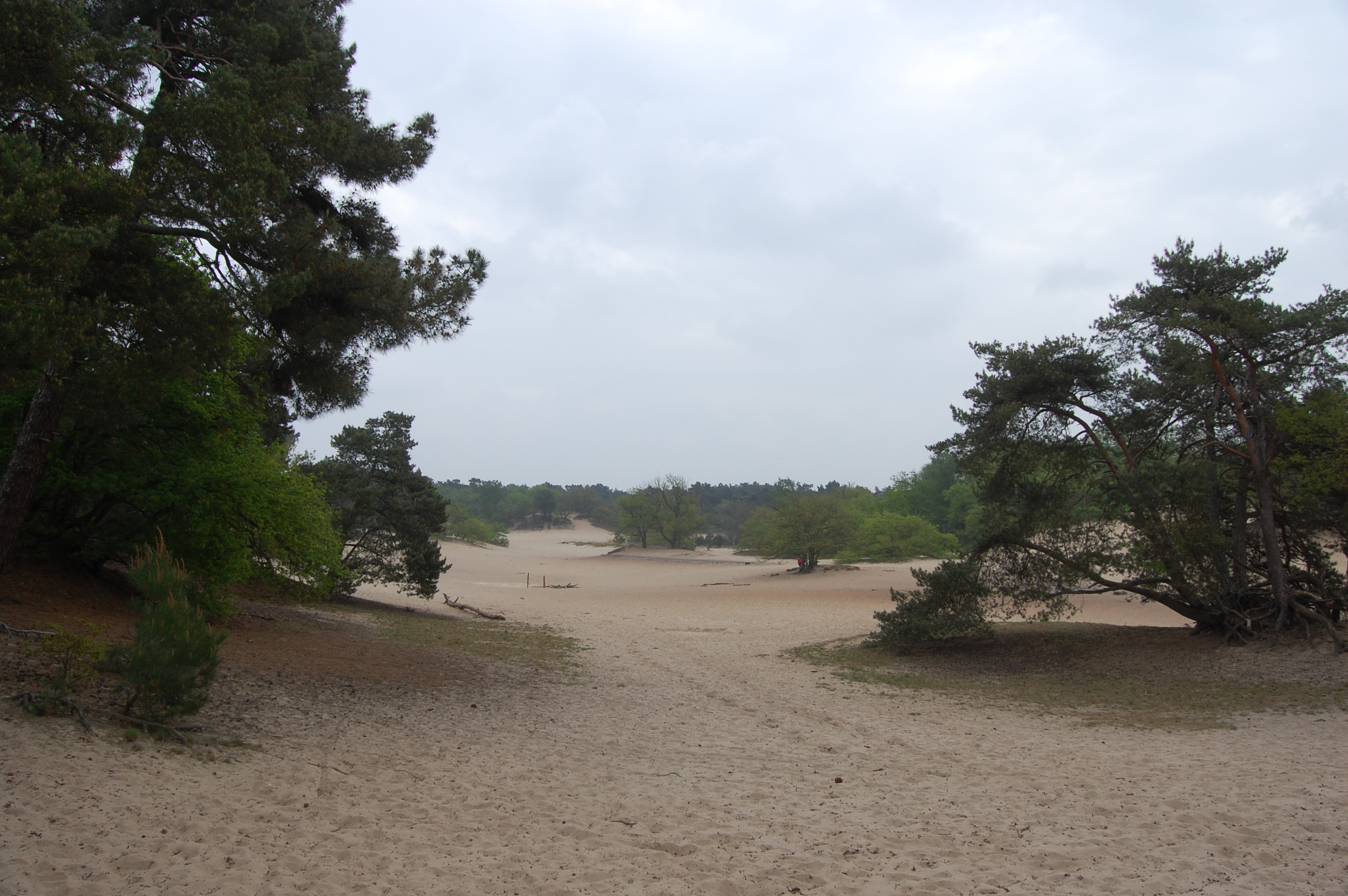
- Dunes in the Loonse en Drunense Duinen

- Location within Netherlands
- Location: North Brabant, Netherlands
- Nearest city: Eindhoven, Den Bosch, Breda, Tilburg
- Coordinates: 51.6456°N 5.1253°E
- Area: 1,200 km^{2} (460 sq mi)
- Established: 2024
- Governing body: Staatsbosbeheer
- Website: www.vangoghnationalpark.com

Van Gogh National Park (Dutch: Van Gogh Nationaal Park) is a Dutch national park in the province of Noord-Brabant. The plan for the park was presented on 30 March 2021. On 14 October 2024 it received the actual National Park status.

The park would consist of several natural areas in the province of North Brabant, including De Loonse en Drunense Duinen National Park and Het Groene Woud. The park is located between the cities of 's-Hertogenbosch, Helmond, Eindhoven, Tilburg and Breda. In addition to nature, the park is intended to promote cultural heritage, sustainability, as well as the local economy.

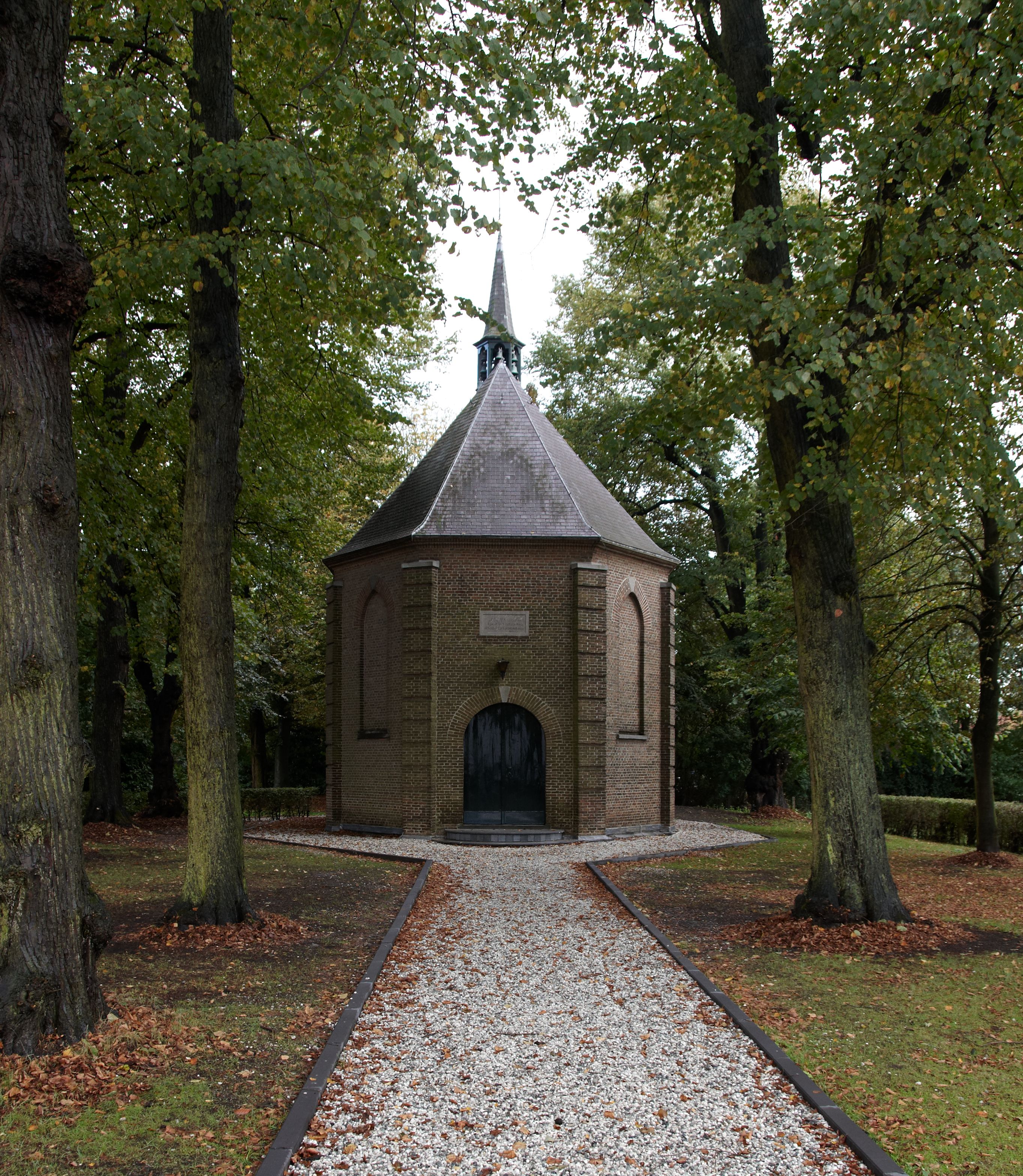
Van Gogh church in Nuenen

The project is named after painter Vincent van Gogh (1853–1890), a native of North Brabant who worked and lived in a number of locations within the area it would cover.
