= Kasteel Well =

Historic castle in Well, Netherlands

Well Castle
- Kasteel Well
- Well, Limburg, the Netherlands
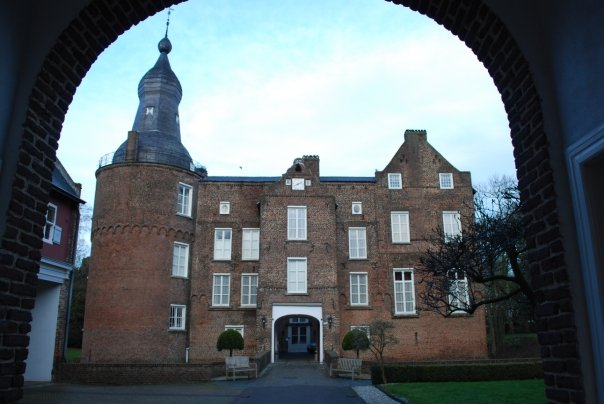
- Well Castle

Site information
- Type: Castle
- Owner: Emerson College
- Open to the public: Castle: No; Gardens: Yes
- Condition: Restored

Location
- The Netherlands
- Location within Netherlands
- Coordinates: 51.552406°N 6.088936°E

Site history
- Built: 14th century
- Materials: Brick

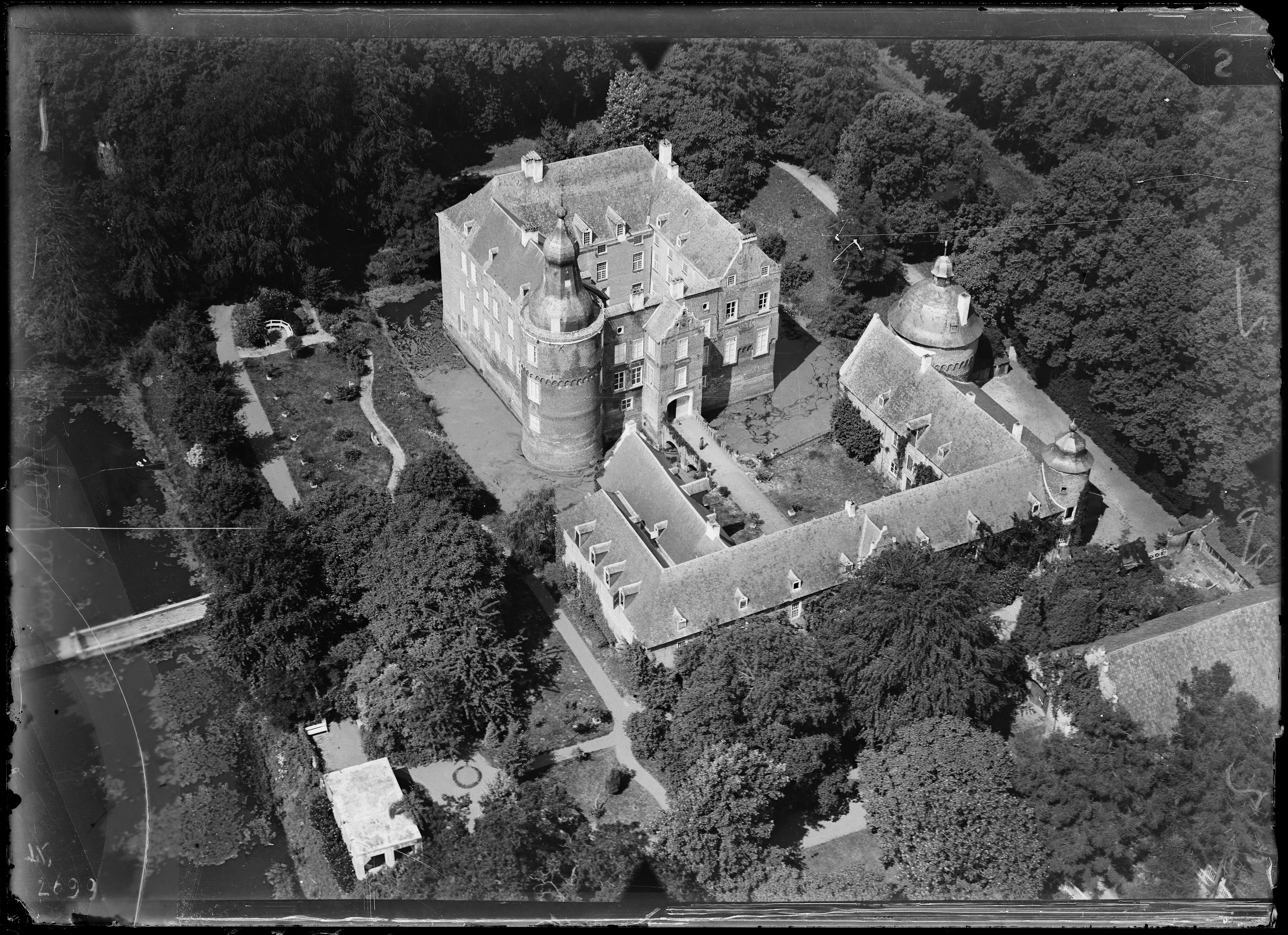
Aerial view of Castle Well, 1920-1940.

Well Castle (Dutch: Kasteel Well) is a fully restored 14th century medieval castle located in the small village of Well, in the Dutch province of Limburg. It is located near the border with Germany, and it is approximately 2 hours southeast of Amsterdam. Kasteel Well itself is made up of two buildings: the Main Castle and the voorburcht, or outer castle. There are two courtyards within Kasteel Well. There are also two moats: an inner and outer moat. These moats once provided protection to the castle and today provide a place to swim for many birds including multiple varieties of ducks, black swans, and geese. Kasteel Well's gardens are available for the public to walk around and admire the grounds. Here there are several well-maintained flower beds, shrubbery, fountains, tower ruins, and trees. Kasteel Well also has several accessory buildings, including a barn than is sometimes used for community events like weddings, among other events, and a tea house that has been converted into a student kitchen.

Emerson College obtained Kasteel Well in 1988 and since then has been using it to house students participating in a study abroad program. Over the years since it was obtained by Emerson, they have made several renovations, the latest of which added new rooms bringing the student capacity per semester to around 90 students.

Every fall and spring semester, approximately eighty students from Emerson's Boston, Massachusetts, campus live in and take classes at Kasteel Well. The classes at the castle have a European focus. The program is headed by program directors Daan Lodder and Rob Dückers. Students studying at the castle have class a maximum of four days per week (Monday-Thursday) and therefore have three-day weekends for travel. Therefore, as a part of their education, students are given the chance to travel throughout the European continent on those long-weekends and also participate in two mandatory educational excursions with the faculty and staff of Kasteel Well. Of late, the first of these mandatory educational excursions has been to Amsterdam, the capital city of the Netherlands. For several years, due to European Union regulations regarding the duration of stay in the Schengen Region, a third excursion was required. Starting in the Spring semester of 2009 however, Emerson shortened their study abroad program at Kasteel Well to fit 90 days exactly, therefore negating the need for and avoiding the cost of an additional excursion.

== List of Mandatory Excursions by Year ==
Semester	Excursion 1	Excursion 2	Excursion 3
Fall 1999	Amsterdam	Paris	Florence
Fall 2001	Amsterdam	Paris	Florence
Fall 2004	Amsterdam	Paris	Florence
Fall 2005	Amsterdam	Paris	Florence
Spring 2006	Amsterdam	Paris	Munich
Fall 2006	London	Prague	London
Spring 2007	London	Prague	London
Fall 2007	London	Prague	London
Spring 2008	London	Dubrovnik	London
Fall 2008	London	Dubrovnik	London
Semester	Excursion 1	Excursion 2	
Spring 2009	Amsterdam	Prague	
Fall 2009	Amsterdam	Berlin	
Spring 2010	Amsterdam	Prague	
Fall 2010	Amsterdam	Berlin	
Spring 2011	Amsterdam	Prague	
Fall 2011	Amsterdam	Berlin	
Spring 2012	Amsterdam	Madrid	
Fall 2012	Amsterdam	Berlin	
Spring 2013	Amsterdam	Madrid	
Fall 2013	Amsterdam	Berlin	
Spring 2014	Amsterdam	Madrid	
Fall 2014	Amsterdam	Vienna	Bratislava
Spring 2015	Amsterdam	Madrid	
Spring 2017	Amsterdam	Barcelona	
Summer 2022	Vienna, Budapest	London, Amsterdam	Dublin
Spring 2023	Amsterdam		
Fall 2023	Amsterdam	Prague	
Spring 2024	Amsterdam	Venice	
Fall 2025	Amsterdam	Vienna	
