= Well, Limburg =

Well
- Village
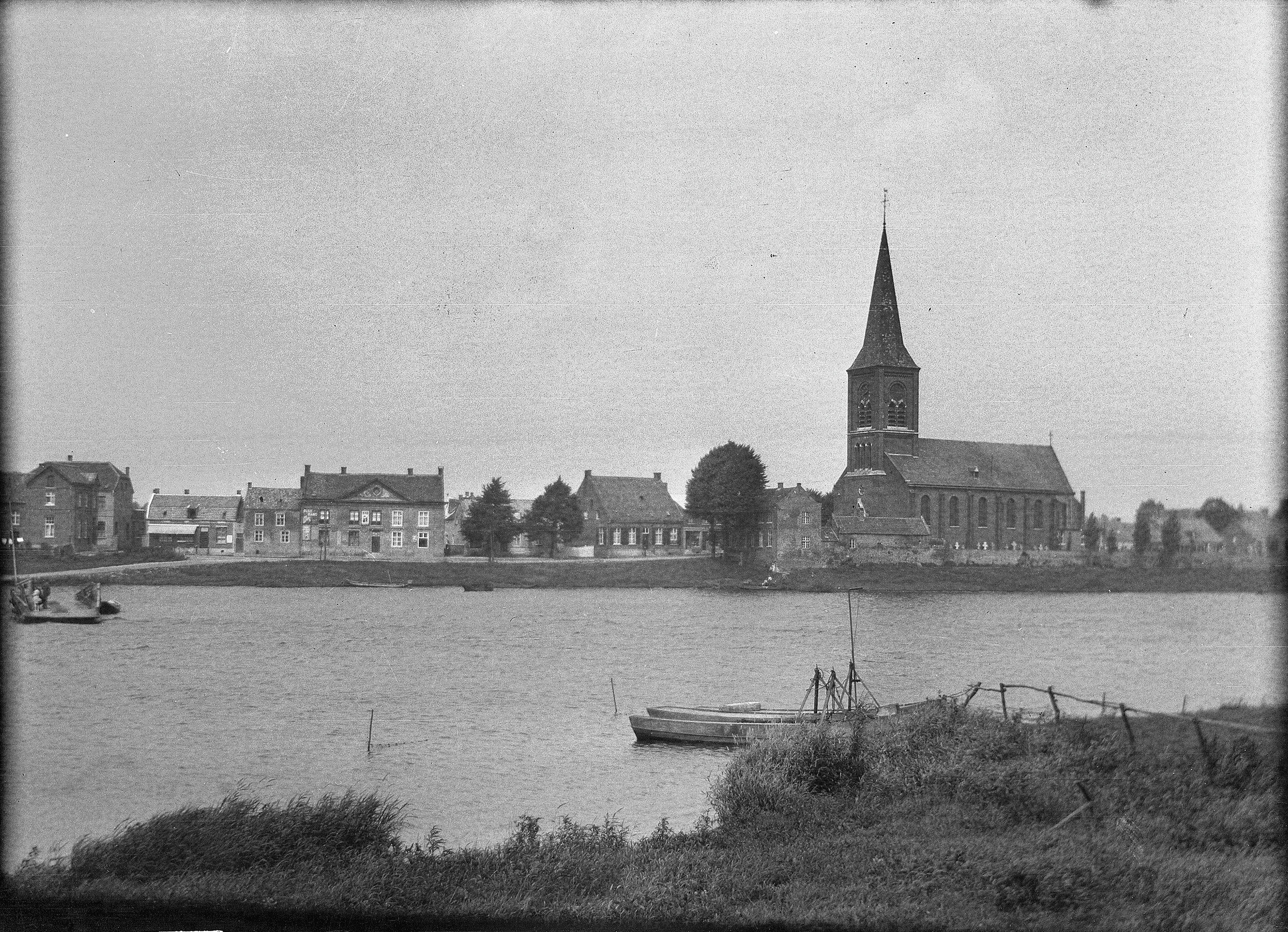
- The old Well on the Maas. The church with early 17th-century parts was destroyed in WWII.

- Coat of arms

- Location in the Netherlands Location in the province of Limburg in the Netherlands
- Coordinates: 51°33′29″N 6°05′19″E
- Country: Netherlands
- Province: Limburg
- Municipality: Bergen, Limburg

Area
  - Total: 28.50 km^{2} (11.00 sq mi)
- Elevation: 17 m (56 ft)

Population (2021)
  - Total: 2,480
  - Density: 87.0/km^{2} (225/sq mi)
- Time zone: UTC+1 (CET)
  - Summer (DST): UTC+2 (CEST)
- Postal code: 5855
- Dialing code: 0478

Well (Dutch pronunciation: [ˈʋɛl]; Limburgish: Wel [ˈwæl]) is a village of about 2,500 residents in the municipality of Bergen in the province of Limburg in the southeastern part of the Netherlands. The town is located between Nijmegen and Venlo, it's east to the town of Venray. The village of Well can be reached via public transport by using bus line 83 or 81.

== Localities ==
Nearby attractions include Thermaalbad Arcen, and The Maasduinen, situated close to the German border (Weeze municipality in North Rhine-Westphalia) and a medieval castle in Well itself, this castle is closed to the public.

=== Kasteel Well ===
Kasteel Well is where Emerson College's European Center is located, which attracts approximately eighty-five (predominantly American) students twice a year.

== Gallery ==
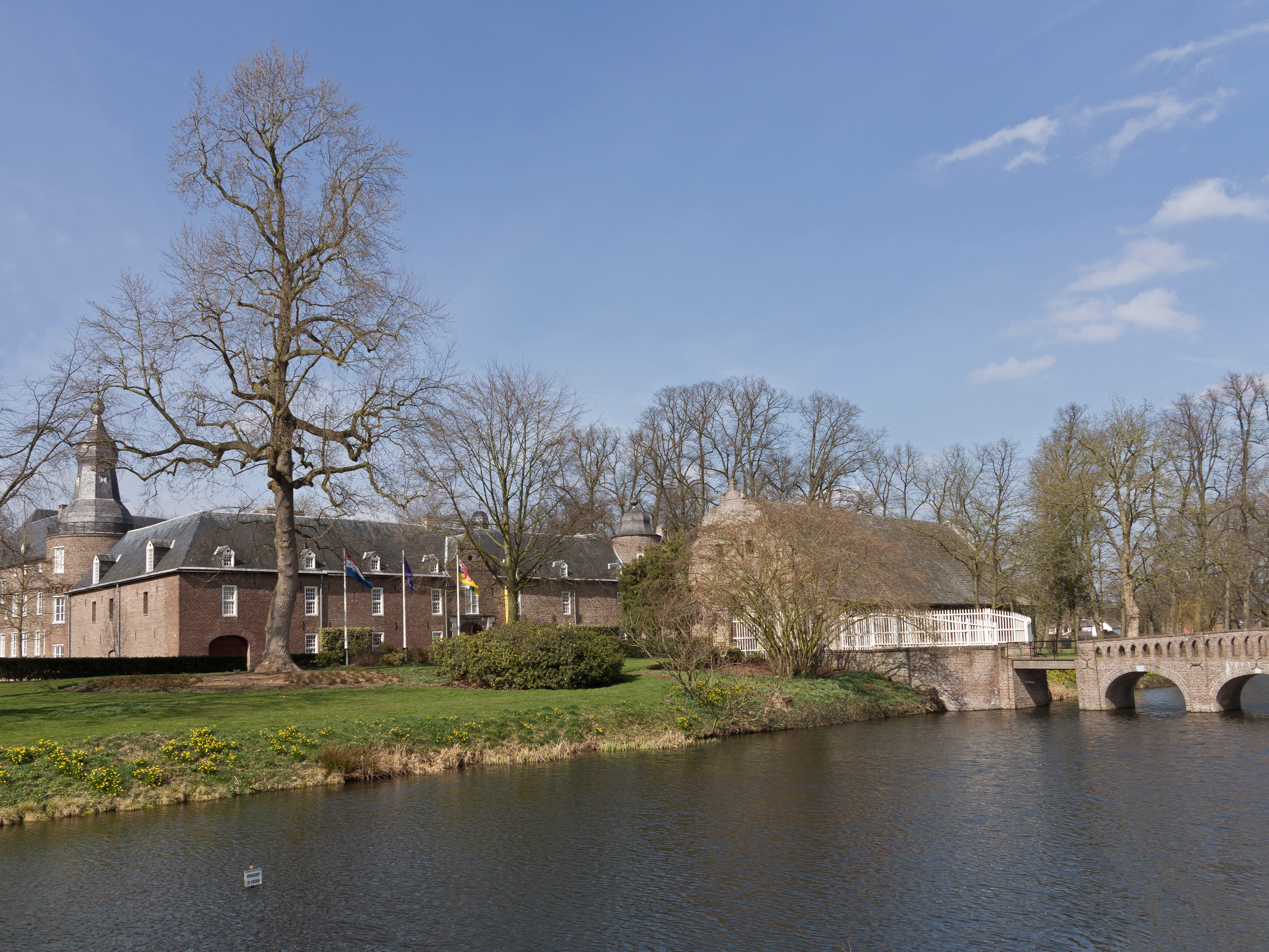
Castle: kasteel Well

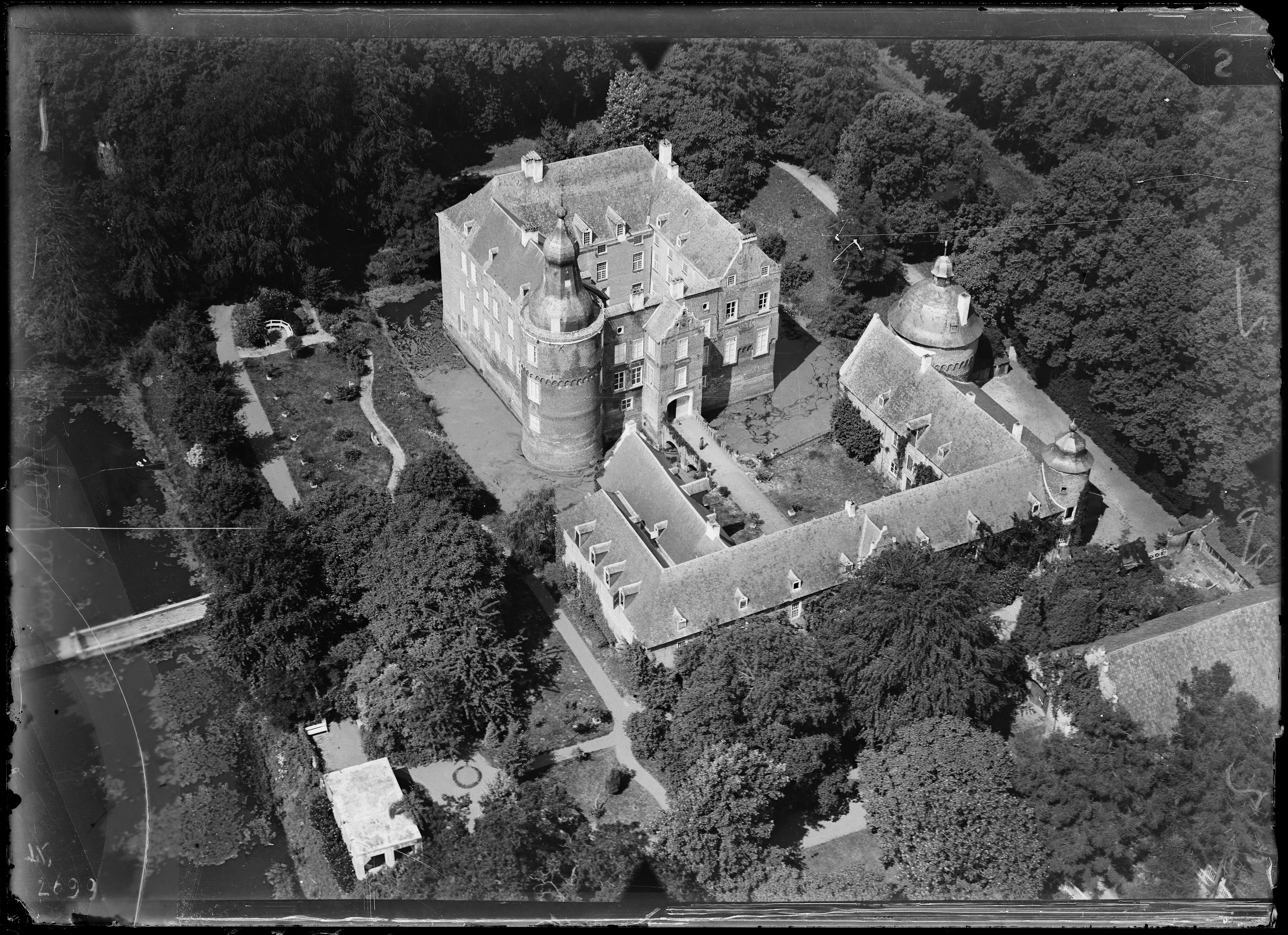
Aerial view of Kasteel Well

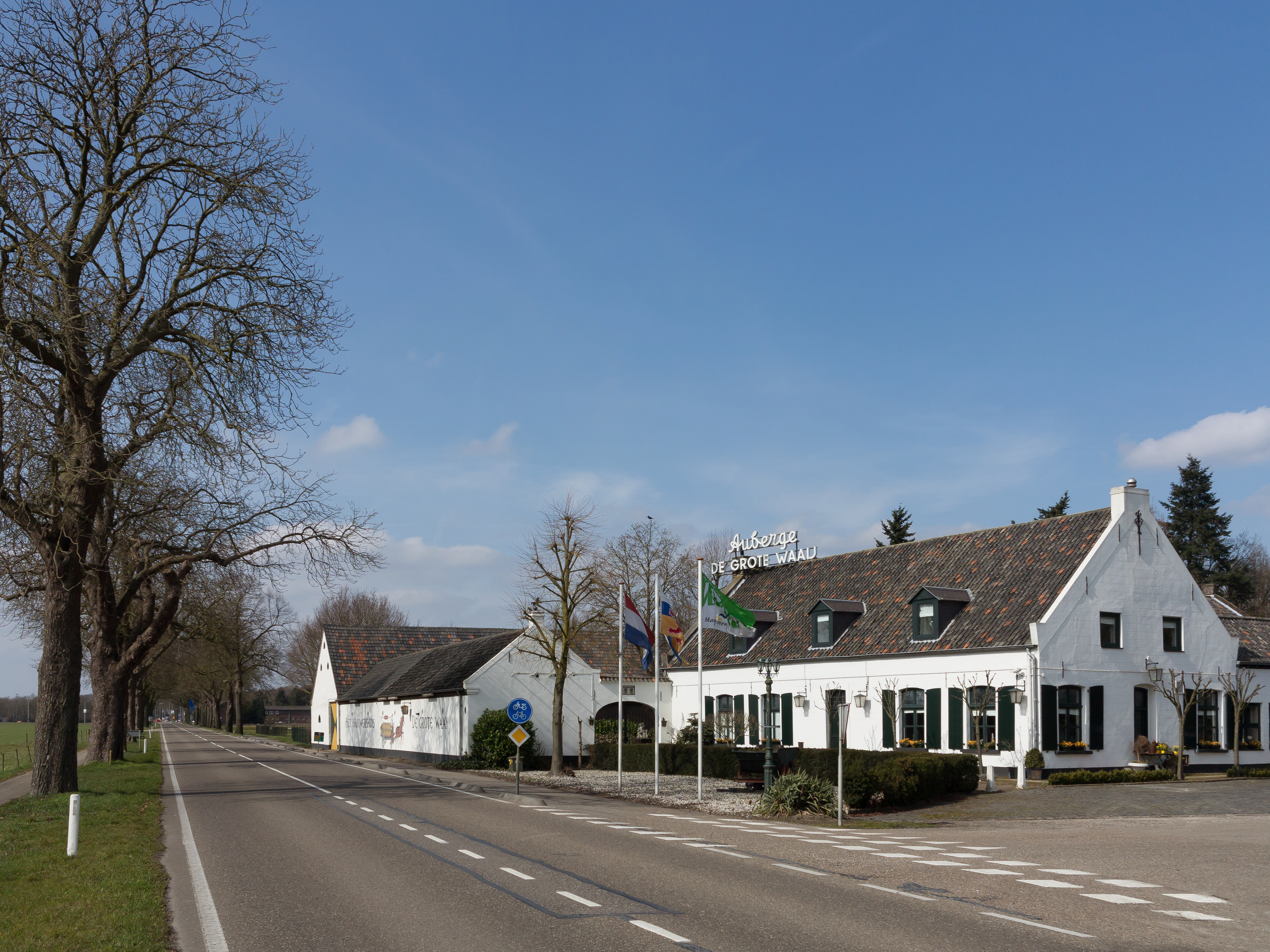
Inn: auberge de Grote Waai

== See also ==
- Population centres in the municipality of Bergen
- Weeze#Culture and tourism
