= Veluwezoom National Park =

National park in Gelderland, the Netherlands

- Nationaal Park Veluwezoom
- IUCN category II (national park)
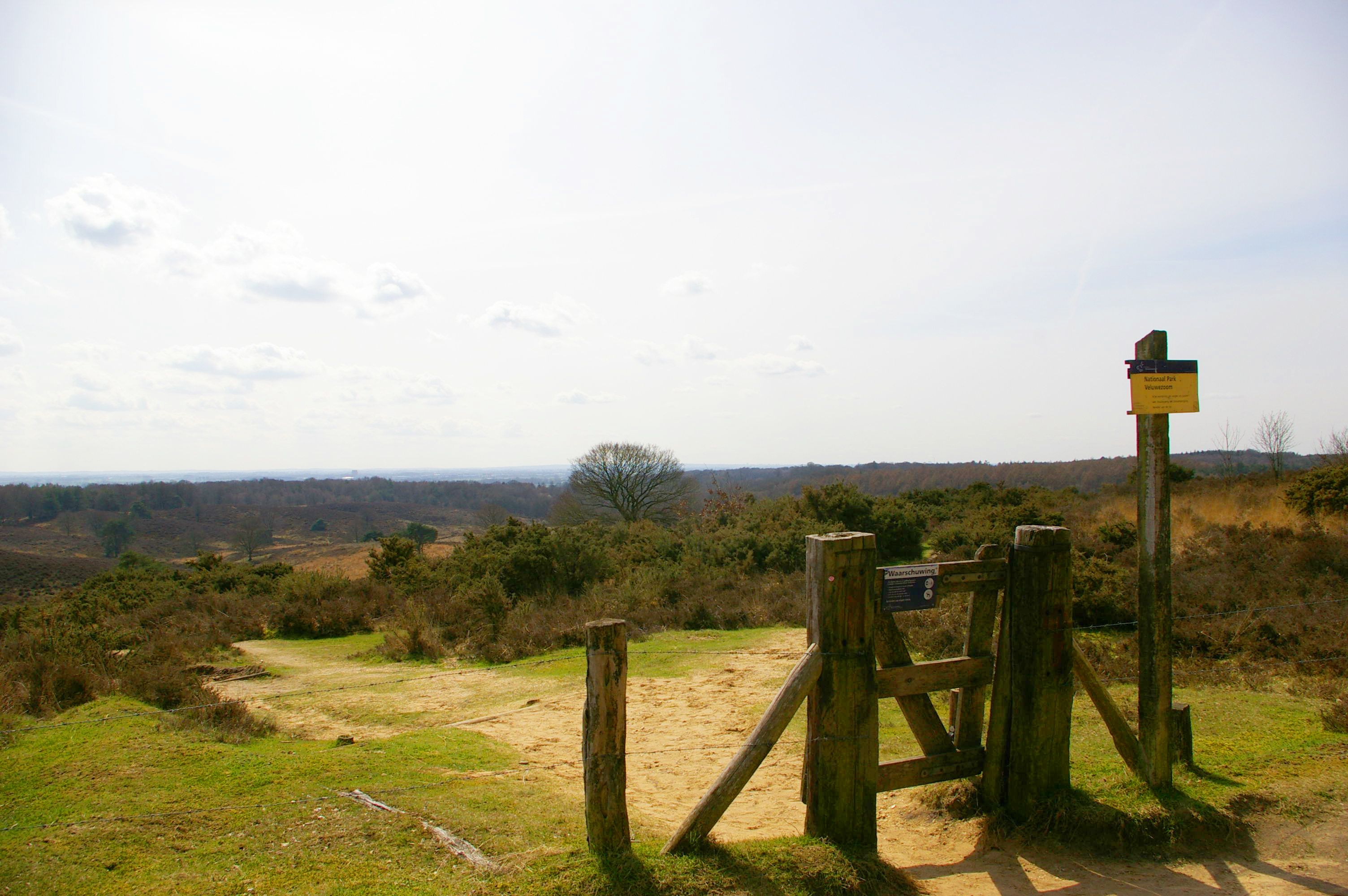
- Posbank (part of the national park)

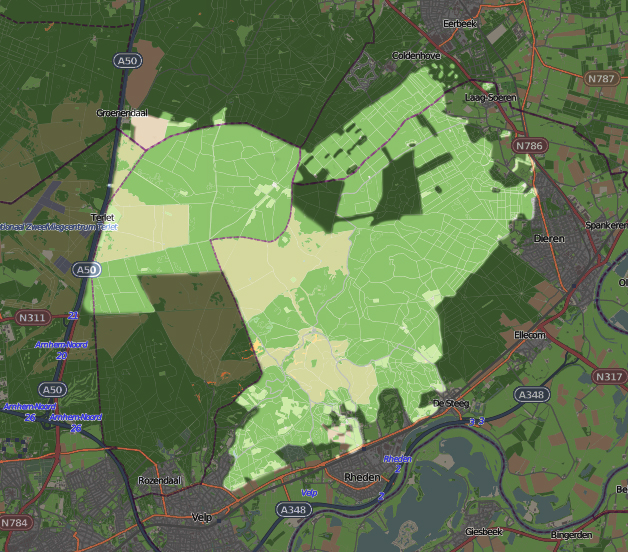
- Map of the national park
- Location: Gelderland, Netherlands
- Coordinates: 52°2′N 5°57′E
- Area: 50 km^{2} (19 sq mi)
- Established: 1930
- Governing body: Natuurmonumenten
- Website: www.natuurmonumenten.nl/natmm-internet/natmm/natuurgebieden.jsp?n=35808

Veluwezoom National Park is a national park in the Netherlands located in the province of Gelderland. It is the oldest national park in the Netherlands. It has a surface area of about 50 square kilometers (some 20 square miles) at the southeastern edge of the Veluwe, a complex of terminal push moraines from the Saalian glaciation. The park has a pronounced relief by Dutch standards, with its highest point at 110 metres (360 ft) above sea level. It is a private national park, owned by Vereniging Natuurmonumenten, the largest nature conservation organisation in the Netherlands.

The landscape of the park consists of forest and heath kept open by grazing Highland cattle, and a small sand drift kept open by human maintenance. The native fauna is red deer, wild boar, badger, and the regionally rare pine marten.
