= Nieuw Land National Park =

National park in Flevoland, the Netherlands

- Nationaal Park Nieuw Land
- IUCN category II (national park)
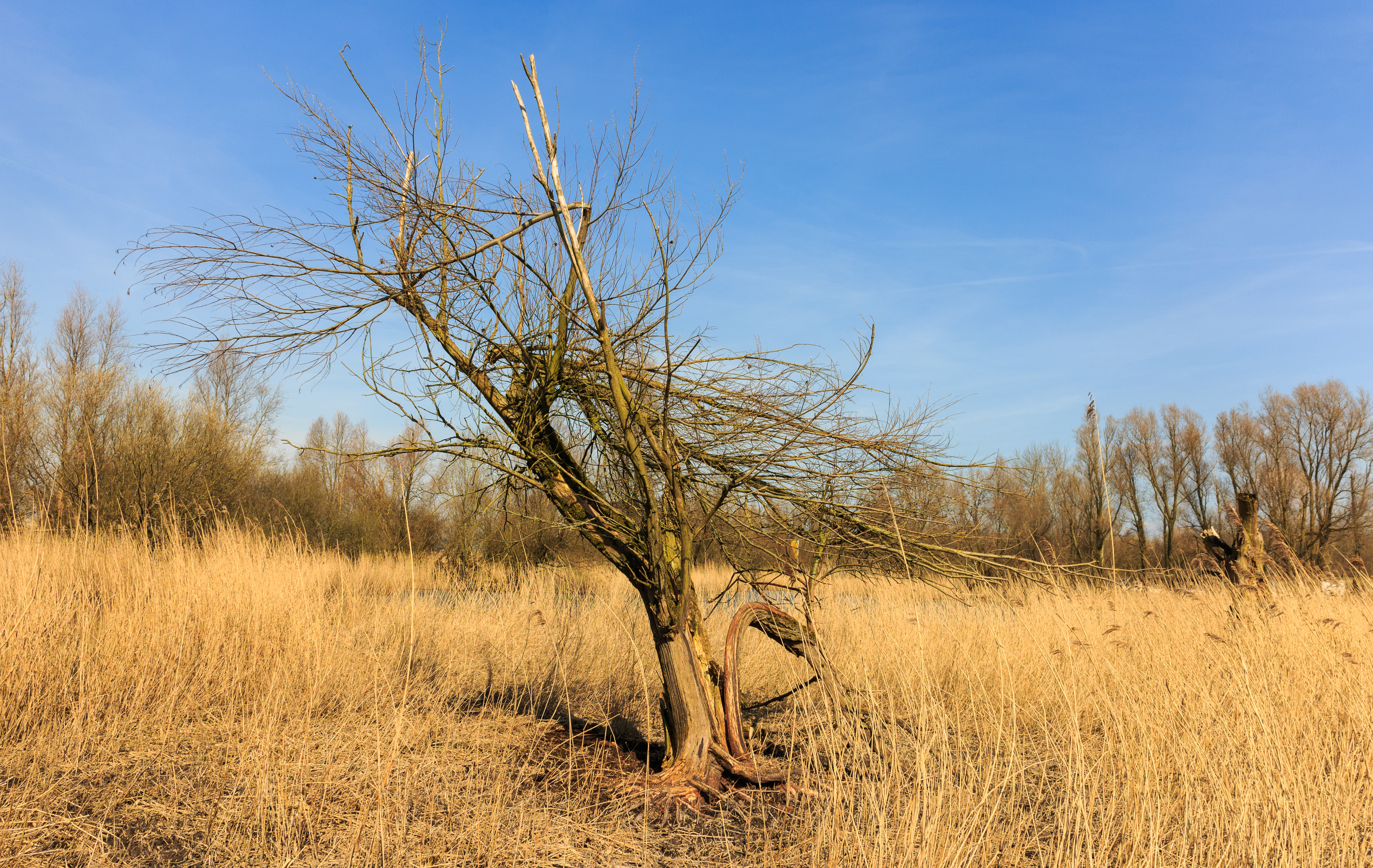
- A dead tree at the Oostvaardersplassen

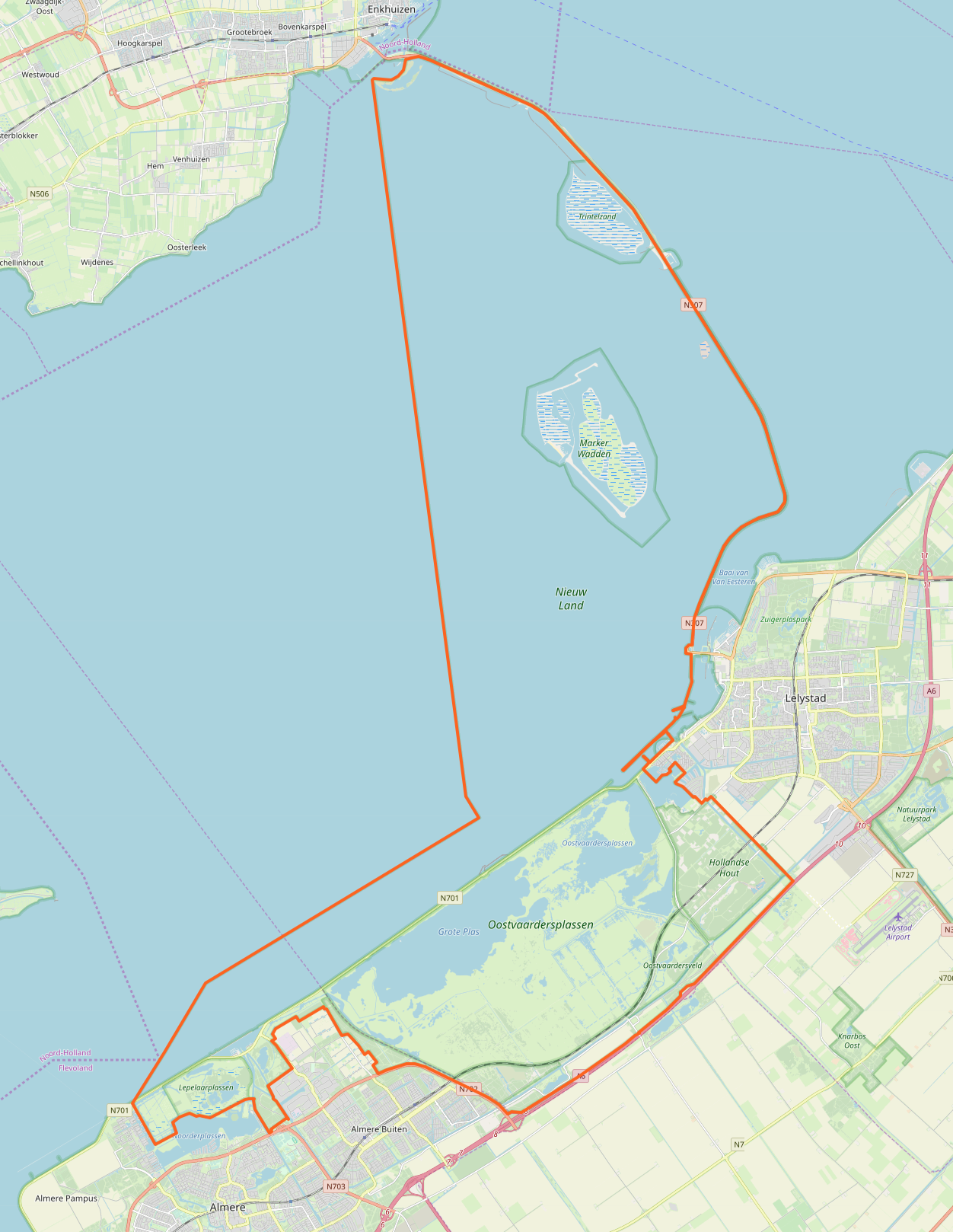
- Map of the national park (area within orange outline)
- Location: Flevoland, Netherlands
- Nearest city: Almere and Lelystad
- Coordinates: 52°33′N 5°22′E
- Area: 289 km^{2} (112 sq mi)
- Established: October 1, 2018
- Administrator: Flevo-landschap, Staatsbosbeheer, Natuurmonumenten
- Website: www.nationaalparknieuwland.nl
- Nieuw Land National Park (Netherlands)

Nieuw Land National Park (New Land National Park; Dutch: Nationaal Park Nieuw Land) is a national park in the Dutch province of Flevoland.

It was established on October 1, 2018, when Minister Carola Schouten visited the province to make the announcement. The national park is managed by the organizations Flevo-landschap, Staatsbosbeheer, and Natuurmonumenten. The total surface area amounts to 289 km^{2} (112 sq mi), of which over 75% is water. The land, mostly wetlands, is part of the artificial island Flevopolder. Nature reserves that are part of the national park include the Oostvaardersplassen, the Lepelaarplassen, the lake Markermeer, and the artificial archipelago Marker Wadden. Some of those areas were already protected Natura 2000 sites before the park's creation. Nieuw Land National Park is visited by numerous species of migratory birds.

In 2019, governments and nature organizations committed to spending €470 million in the next twenty years to develop the park and to connect its separate parts.
