= Dwingelderveld National Park =

National park in Drenthe, Netherlands

- Nationaal Park Dwingelderveld
- IUCN category II (national park)
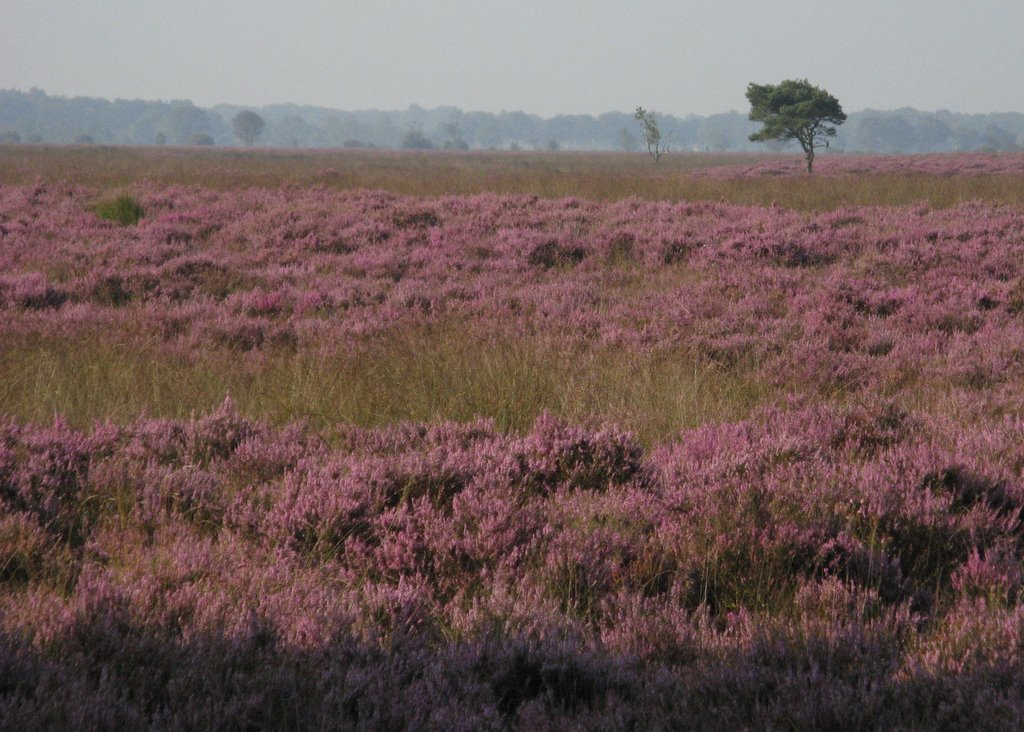
- Dwingelderveld National Park

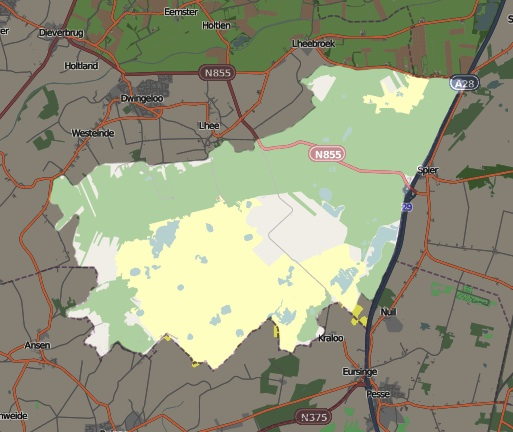
- Map of Dwingelderveld National Park
- Location: Drenthe, Netherlands
- Coordinates: 52.803°N 6.399°E
- Area: 37 km^{2} (14 sq mi)
- Established: 1991

Dwingelderveld National Park is a national park of the Netherlands in the province of Drenthe, founded in 1991. The park covers about 37 km^{2} (14 sq mi) and is mainly managed by the State Forest Service (Staatsbosbeheer) and the most important Dutch private nature management organisation Natuurmonumenten. It is the largest wet heathland of Western-Europe. Dwingelderveld is also designated as a Natura 2000-area.

== Archeology and history ==
Dwingelderveld was used by early inhabitants for religious purposes and agriculture. Celtic fields and burial mounds are still clearly recognisable in the field. Later the area was used as a transport route from Germany to the Netherlands, some of the old trails can still be found in the National Park. Nevertheless, the area has never been used intensively by humans. In the 1930s, there were reclamation plans, but nature conservation organisations purchased a part of the area to save it. Other parts have been in use for forestry.

== Landscape ==
The most characteristic features of the park are the large moor and heath lands. The structure of the terrain is quite varied with relatively high (compared to the rest of the lowland country) sandy hills and wet lower parts, including many fens. Some of these fens are pingo-ruins from the last glacial.

In former days, the heath was in use as a part of the agricultural system. At present, it is not the case anymore so new ways have to be found to keep the heath in its present condition and to prevent the growth of trees. Sheep are still in use - there is a sheepfold in the park, but also cows are used to graze, and special machines are developed to manage the heath. In the park, one of largest Dutch juniper thickets can be found.

== Flora and fauna ==
In the park four 'heath species' are rather common: Calluna vulgaris, Erica tetralix Empetrum nigrum and Andromeda polifolia. There are also Rosera intermedia, Eriophorum vaginatum, Gentiana pneumonanthe and several orchid species.

In the Dwingelderveld area, three snake species occur and several rare butterflies.

== Recreation ==
In the national park is a visitor centre. In addition, there are many camp sites, hotels and restaurants. There is also an astronomy centre, the Planetron, accessible to tourists.
