= Oosterschelde National Park =

- Nationaal Park Oosterschelde
- IUCN category II (national park)
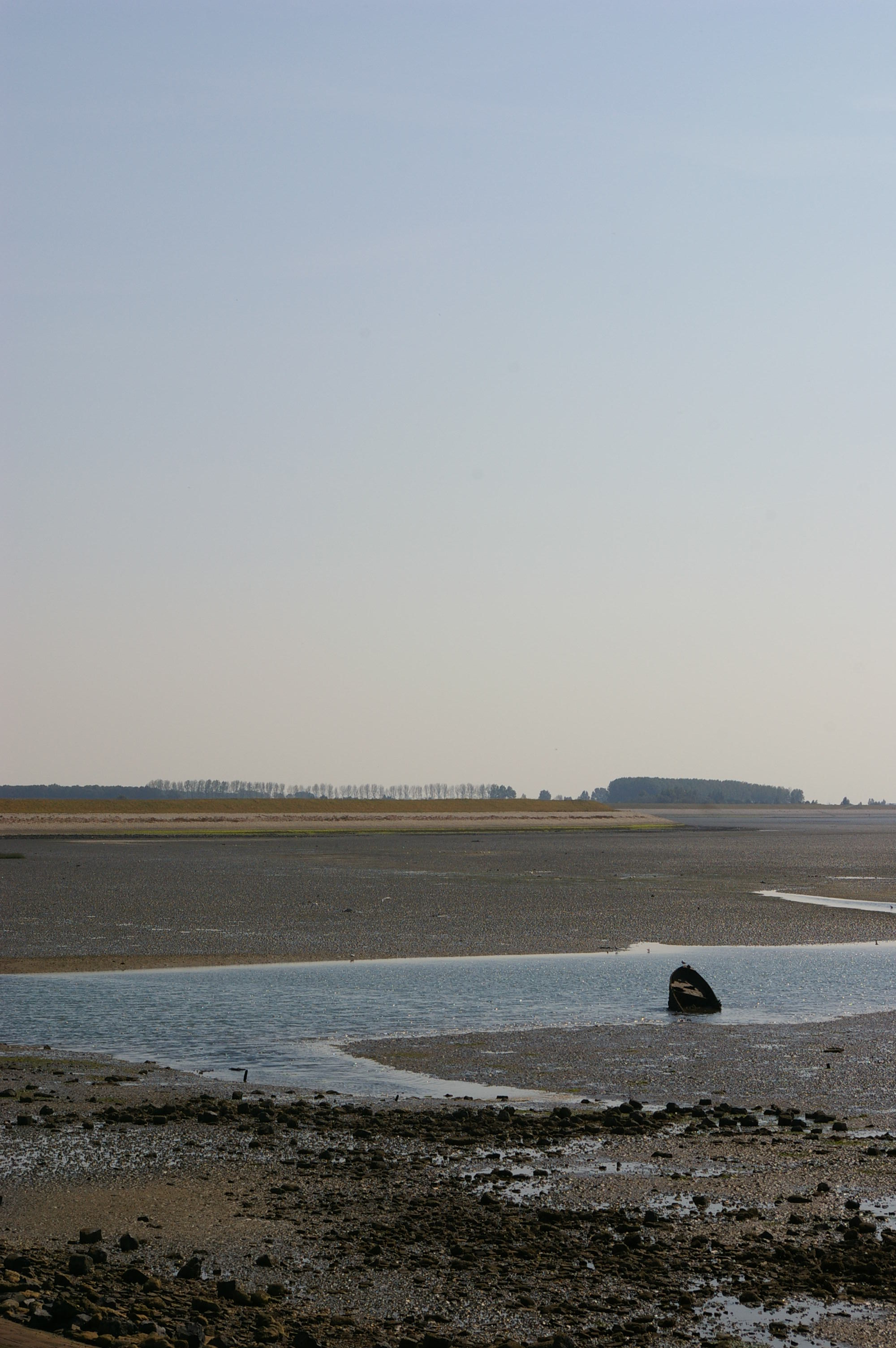
- Eastern Scheldt near Tholen

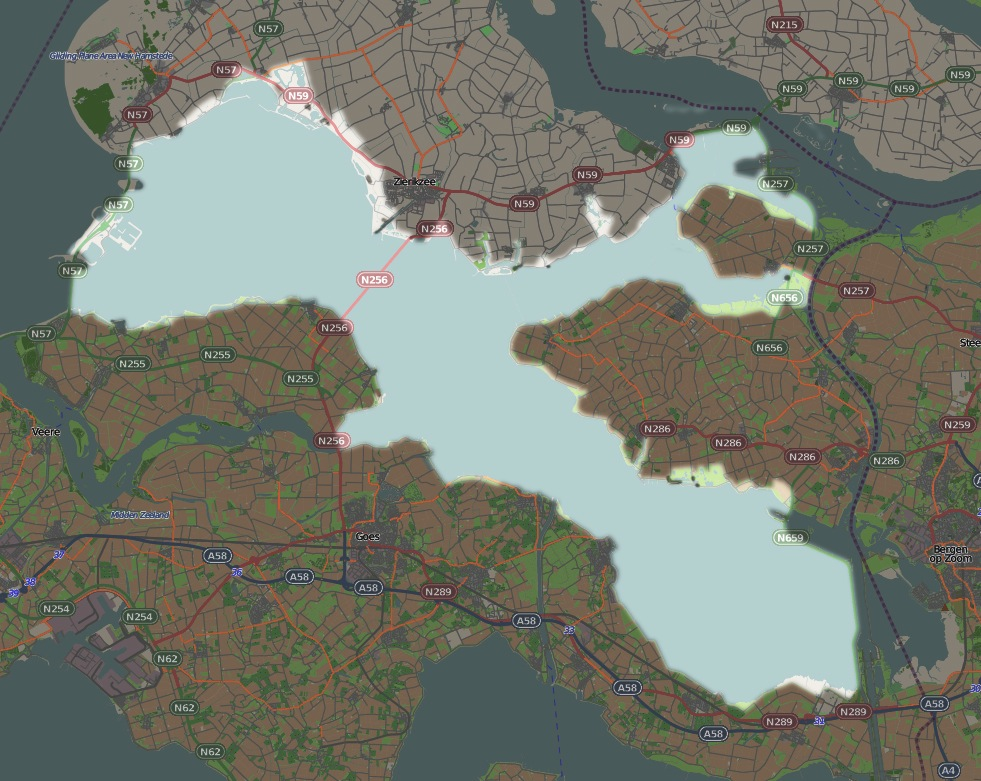
- Map of the national park
- Location: Zeeland, Netherlands
- Nearest city: Zierikzee
- Coordinates: 51°35′N 3°55′E
- Area: 37,000 ha (91,000 acres)
- Established: 2002
- Website: www.np-oosterschelde.nl

Oosterschelde National Park is a national park in the Dutch province of Zeeland.

This national park was established on 8 May 2002. It comprises the Eastern Scheldt (Dutch: Oosterschelde), Keeten-Mastgat, Krabbenkreek, Zijpe, Slaak, and Krammer. The Eastern Scheldt part behind the Oesterdam doesn't belong to the national park.

Oosterschelde National Park is surrounded by the following regions: Schouwen-Duiveland, Tholen, Zuid-Beveland, and Noord-Beveland.

The Zeeland Bridge crosses the national park.

== See also ==
- Eastern Scheldt
