= Schiermonnikoog National Park =

Protected area in the Netherlands

- Nationaal Park Schiermonnikoog
- IUCN category II (national park)
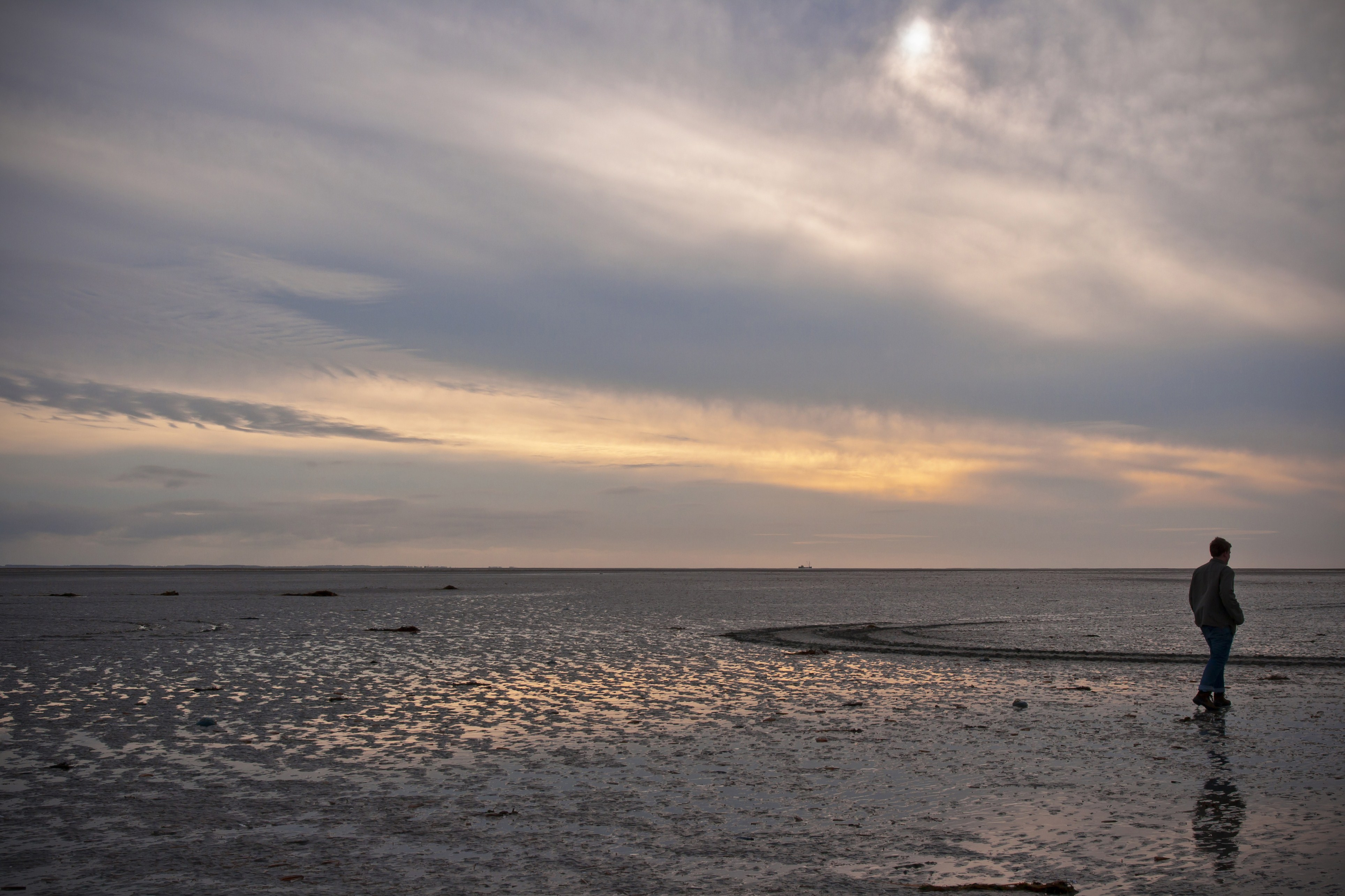
- Landscape in Schiermonnikoog National Park

- Location within Netherlands
- Location: Schiermonnikoog, Friesland, Netherlands
- Coordinates: 53°29′21″N 6°13′55″E
- Area: 72 km^{2} (28 sq mi)
- Established: 1989
- Website: www.nationaalpark.nl/schiermonnikoog/default.xml

Ramsar Wetland
- Official name: Duinen Schiermonnikoog
- Designated: 29 August 2000
- Reference no.: 2214

Schiermonnikoog National Park is a national park in the Dutch province of Friesland. It was founded in 1989. It covers about 72 km^{2} (28 sq mi), the majority of the island Schiermonnikoog.

== Landscape and history ==
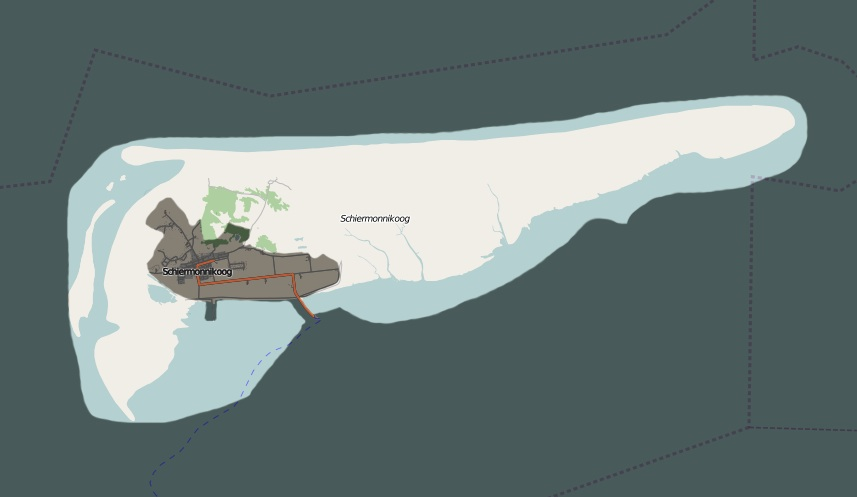
Map of Schiermonnikoog NP

The island arose during the last glacial period and its shape has been very variable since then. Dominant processes are sand drifting, erosion and sedimentation along the coasts, characteristic for a tidal landscape. In former times, only few people lived on the island, most fishermen. Around 1900, the state started forestry programs to prevent sand drifting. In addition, dikes were built to protect the island and its population. Some of the marshes were embanked in the course of time and transformed to polders for agriculture. During the 20th century tourism and recreation became more important and part of the island was designated as nature reserve. At present, we find dunes, forests, polders, tidal flats, marshes and beaches on the island, as well as a small lake and a village.

== Flora, fauna, and funga ==
The island has a very rich fauna, and flora, and funga. In the dunes we find common hawthorn, the common sea-buckthorn, honeysuckle; on the marshes sea lavender, sea wormwood, sea aster and glasswort. Lichens and mushrooms can be found throughout the island, as well as many species of insects. On the marshes and tidal flats thousands of birds occur, such as common redshank, barnacle goose, spoonbill, hen harrier, oystercatcher, red knot, bar-tailed godwit, curlew and European herring gull. In the past the rabbit was very common, but because of the rabbit haemorrhagic disease (RHD), the species is rare now. In the sea there are gray seal, common seal, eelgrass and many species of seaweeds.

== Management ==
Natuurmonumenten is responsible for the management of the national park and Rijkswaterstaat for coastal protection. One of the aims of the management is to make the dunes more dynamic. The bird colonies are protected through regulation of the numbers of visitors in spring and summer.

== Recreation ==
The island is a popular place to visit, especially the beaches. Because the island is isolated, because the use of cars by visitors is forbidden and because there are very few inhabitants and farmers on the island, it is one of the best protected Dutch national parks. There is a visitors centre in the village of Schiermonnikoog. There is one campground and there are several hotels and restaurants.
