= De Maasduinen National Park =

Protected area in the Netherlands

- Nationaal Park De Maasduinen
- IUCN category II (national park)
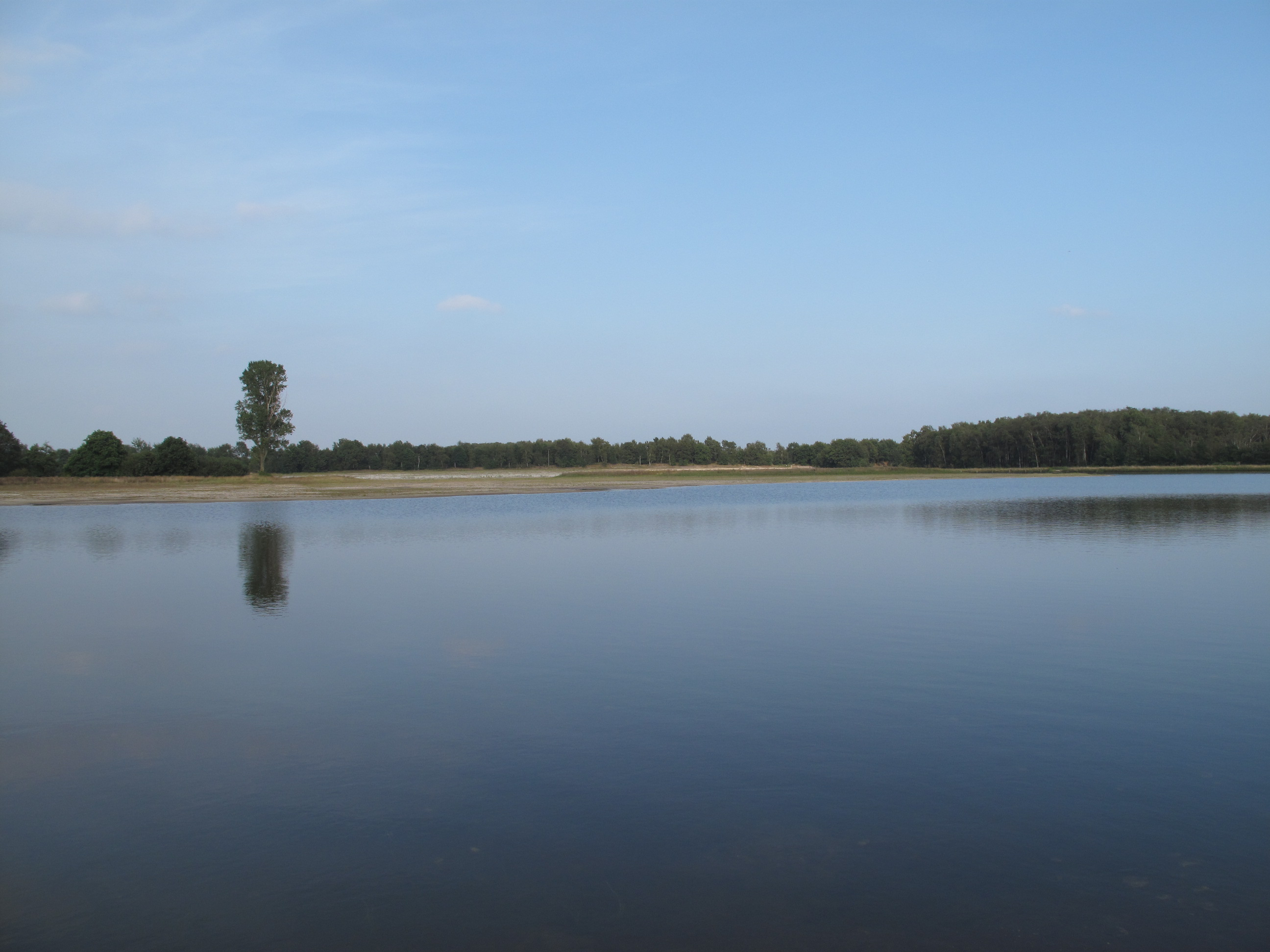
- A lake in the park

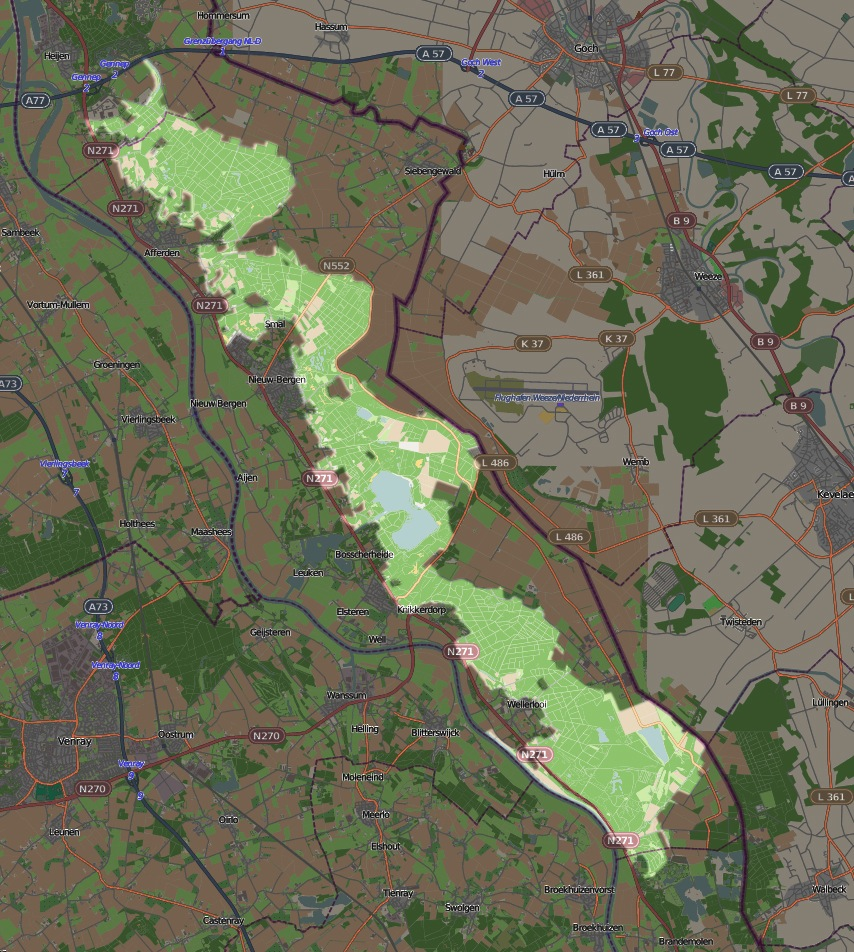
- Map of the National Park
- Location: Limburg, Netherlands
- Coordinates: 51°35′N 6°05′E
- Area: 45 km^{2} (17 sq mi)
- Established: 1996
- Governing body: Staatsbosbeheer
- Website: www.np-demaasduinen.nl

De Maasduinen National Park (duinen = dunes) is a national park in the Dutch province of Limburg, founded in 1996 and covering approximately 4500 ha. The landscape consists of forests and heathlands on a sandy plateau along the river Meuse close to the German border. The estate 'de Hamert' is the heart of the park. Until 1998 the national park was called 'De Hamert' after this estate. The present name is derived from the parabolic dunes which date from the last glaciation.

== Landscape and history ==
The present characteristics of the park are strongly influenced by an intense interplay of wind, water and humans through the course of time, resulting in a unique pattern of drifting sand ridges or parabolic dunes. At present drifting sand is rare due to the forestry programs of the state at the beginning of the 20th century. Besides heathlands and forests, there are several fens in the park. A part of the area was used for sand and gravel extraction in the 1980s.

== Flora and fauna ==
In the park quite a lot of reptiles and amphibians species occur such as Smooth snake, Natterjack toad, Pelobates fuscus, Sand lizard, Slow worm, and Viviparous lizard. Some typical birds for the park are Common crane, European nightjar, Eurasian hobby, Western marsh harrier, Black woodpecker and Common kingfisher. Several marten species can be found in the park, such as the beaver (Eurasian beaver), as well as several bat species such as Common pipistrelle and Brown long-eared bat. There are at least 26 species of dragonflies and 33 species of butterflies.

Among the flora we find several oak species, birch, pine, alder and beech and the very rare marsh gentian (Gentiana pneumonanthe) and bog myrtle (Myrica gale).

== Management ==
Responsible for the management of the park are the municipality of Bergen, the provincial private nature conservation organisation Stichting het Limburgs Landschap, Staatsbosbeheer and some private land owners.

One of the aims of the management is to connect the national park with other nature reserves. Other aims are to prevent forest growth in the heathlands (for this, sheep are used) and to stimulate natural rejuvenation of the forests (for this, Galloways and goat are used).

== See also ==
- Well, Limburg#Localities
