= De Loonse en Drunense Duinen National Park =

National park in the Netherlands

- Nationaal Park De Loonse en Drunense Duinen
- IUCN category II (national park)
- Aerial video of the Loonse en Drunese Duinen area.
- Interactive map of De Loonse en Drunense Duinen National Park
- Location: North Brabant, Netherlands
- Coordinates: 51°38′52″N 5°06′53″E
- Area: 35 km^{2} (14 sq mi)
- Established: 2002

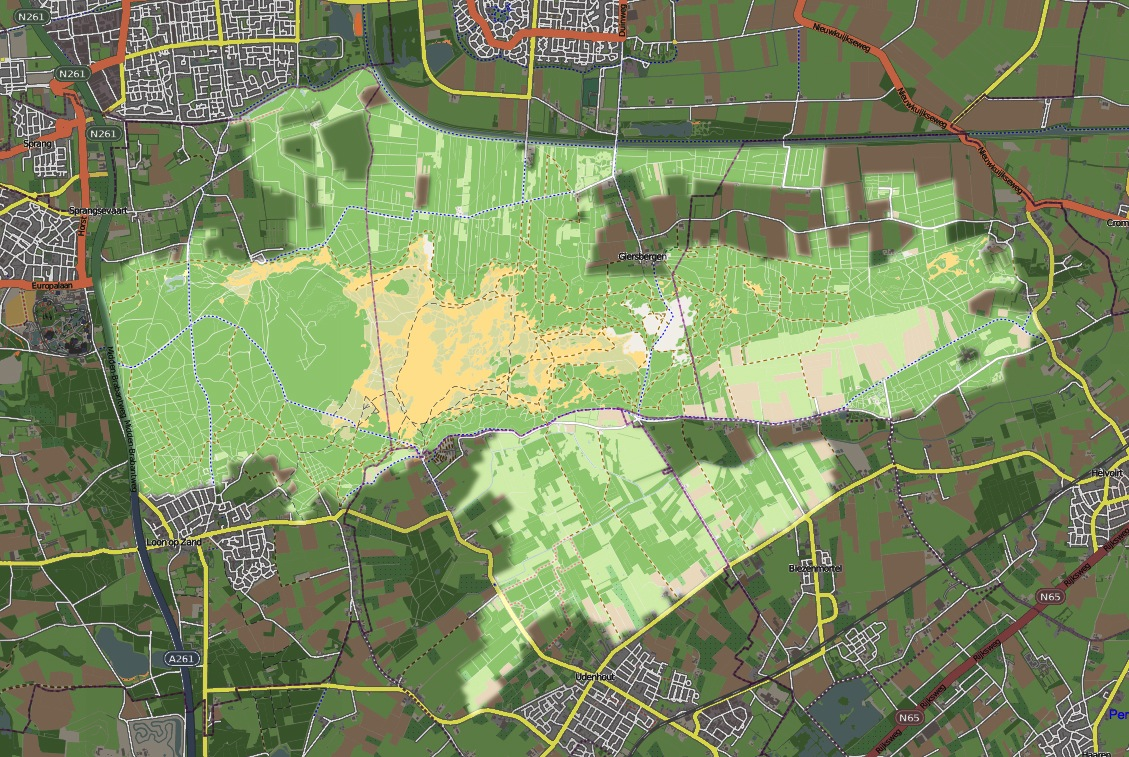
Detail map

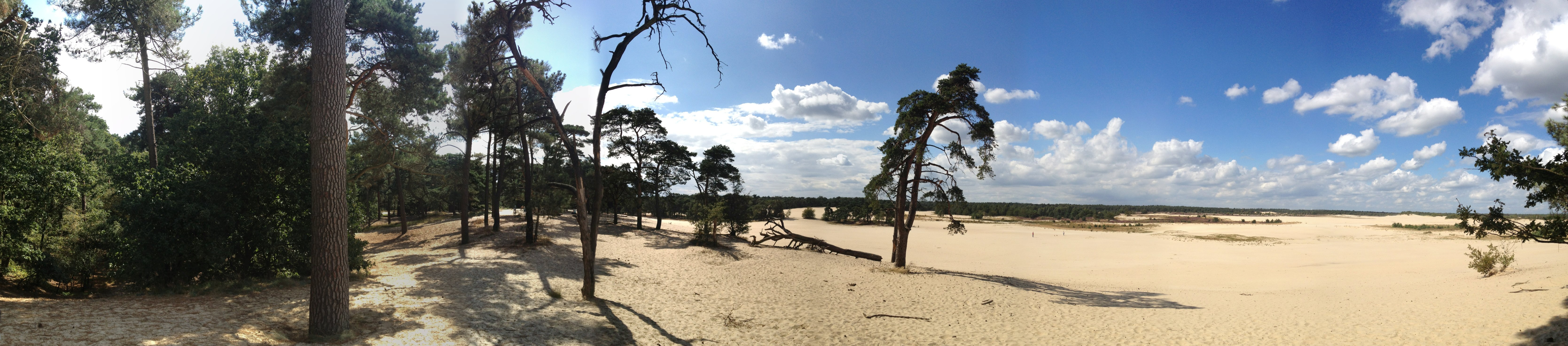
Loonse en Drunense Duinen

De Loonse en Drunense Duinen National Park (duinen = dunes) is a national park situated in the south of the Netherlands, between the cities of Tilburg, Waalwijk and 's-Hertogenbosch. It has been designated as a national park since 2002. It is 35 km^{2} (14 mile²) in area, and located in the municipalities of Loon op Zand, Heusden, and Vught.

The Loonse en Drunense Duinen consists of forests and very large dunes, creating an extraordinary microclimate.
