= Haren, Groningen =

Haren Hoaren (Gronings)
- Town, former municipality
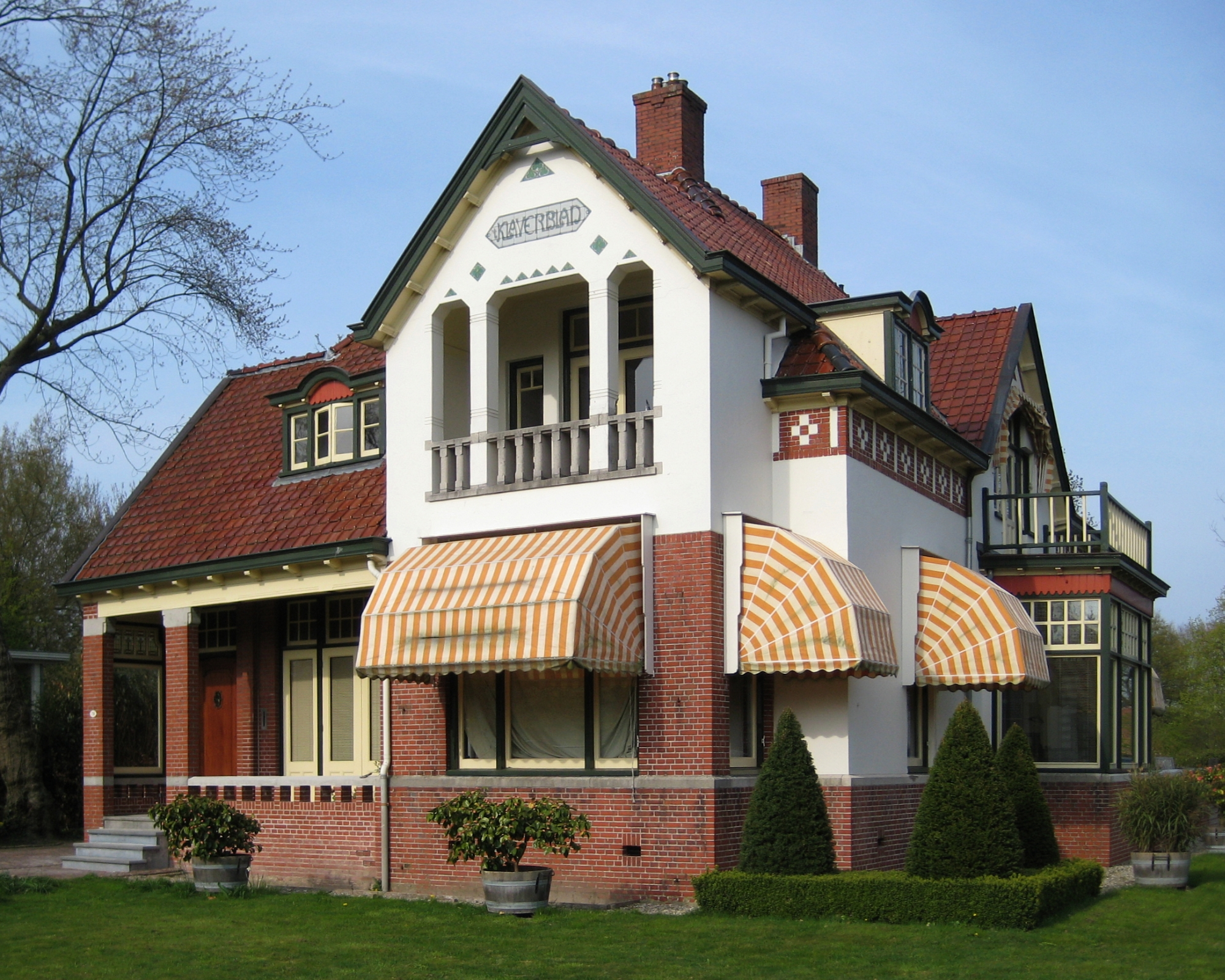
- Monumental villa in Haren

- Flag Coat of arms

- Location in Groningen

- Location in the province of Groningen in the Netherlands Haren (Netherlands)
- Coordinates: 53°10′N 6°36′E
- Country: Netherlands
- Province: Groningen
- Municipality: Groningen
- Merged: 2019

Area
  - Total: 17.44 km^{2} (6.73 sq mi)
- Elevation: 7 m (23 ft)

Population (2021)
  - Total: 12,835
  - Density: 736.0/km^{2} (1,906/sq mi)
- Demonym: Harenaar
- Time zone: UTC+1 (CET)
  - Summer (DST): UTC+2 (CEST)
- Postcode: 9751-9751
- Area code: 050

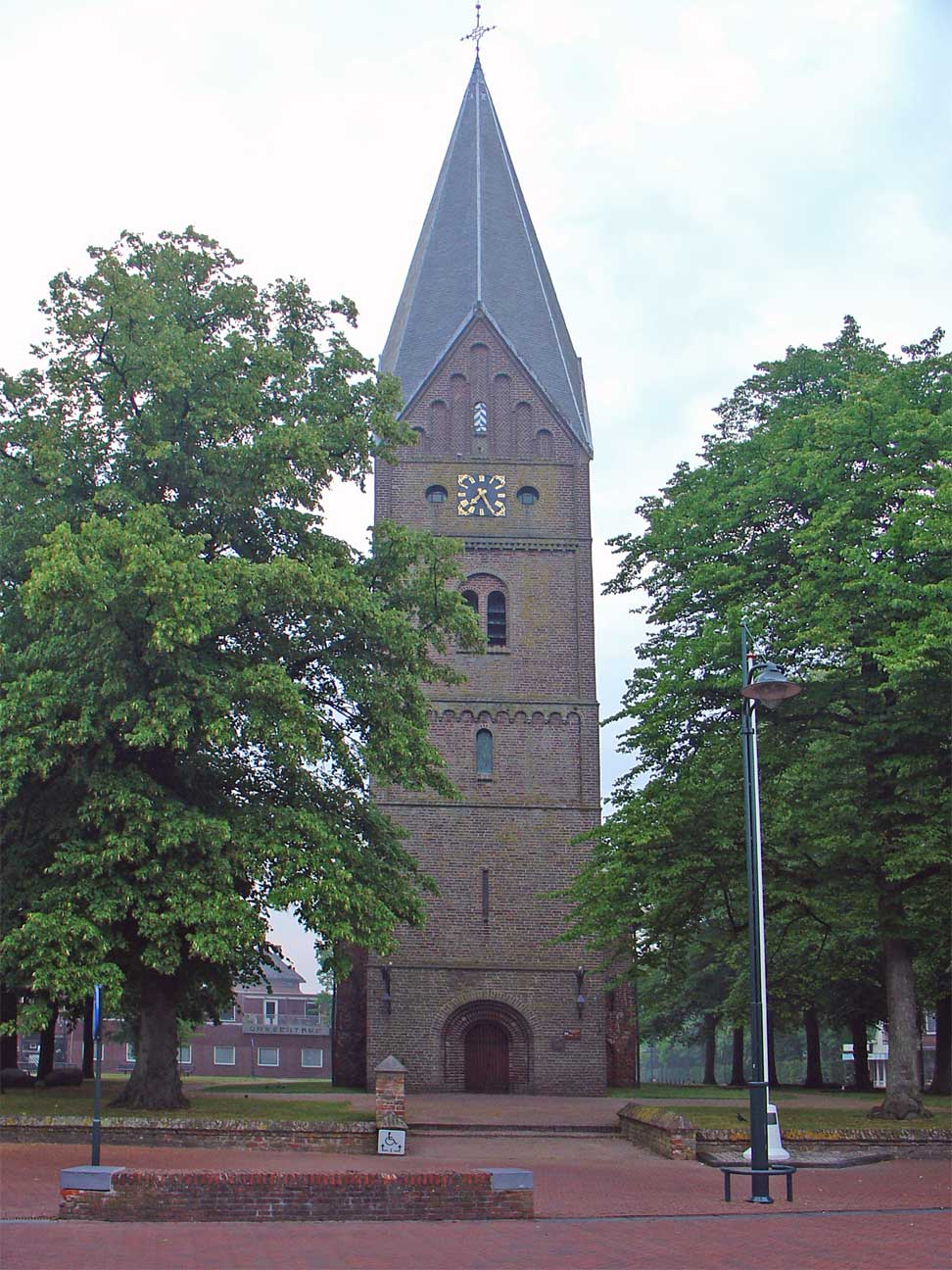
Reformed Church of Nicolaas

Haren (Dutch: [ˈɦaːrə(n)]; Gronings: Hoaren) is a town and a former municipality in the northeastern Netherlands. It is located in the direct urban area of the City of Groningen and, in January 2019, was merged into the municipality of Groningen.

Haren is a commuting town with many wealthy inhabitants. It lies on the northern part of a ridge of sand called the Hondsrug. It contains one of two dolmens in the province of Groningen (in the village of Noordlaren) and the largest botanical garden of the Netherlands called Hortus Haren. The municipality comprises a woodland area called Appèlbergen (east of the village of Glimmen) and a lake called Paterswoldsemeer.

The first mention of Haren was in 1249.

On 21 September 2012, riots broke out in Haren when over 3,000 people turned up to a birthday party that was accidentally made public on Facebook. There were over 30 arrests after vandalism and looting caused over a million euros in damage.

== Population centres ==
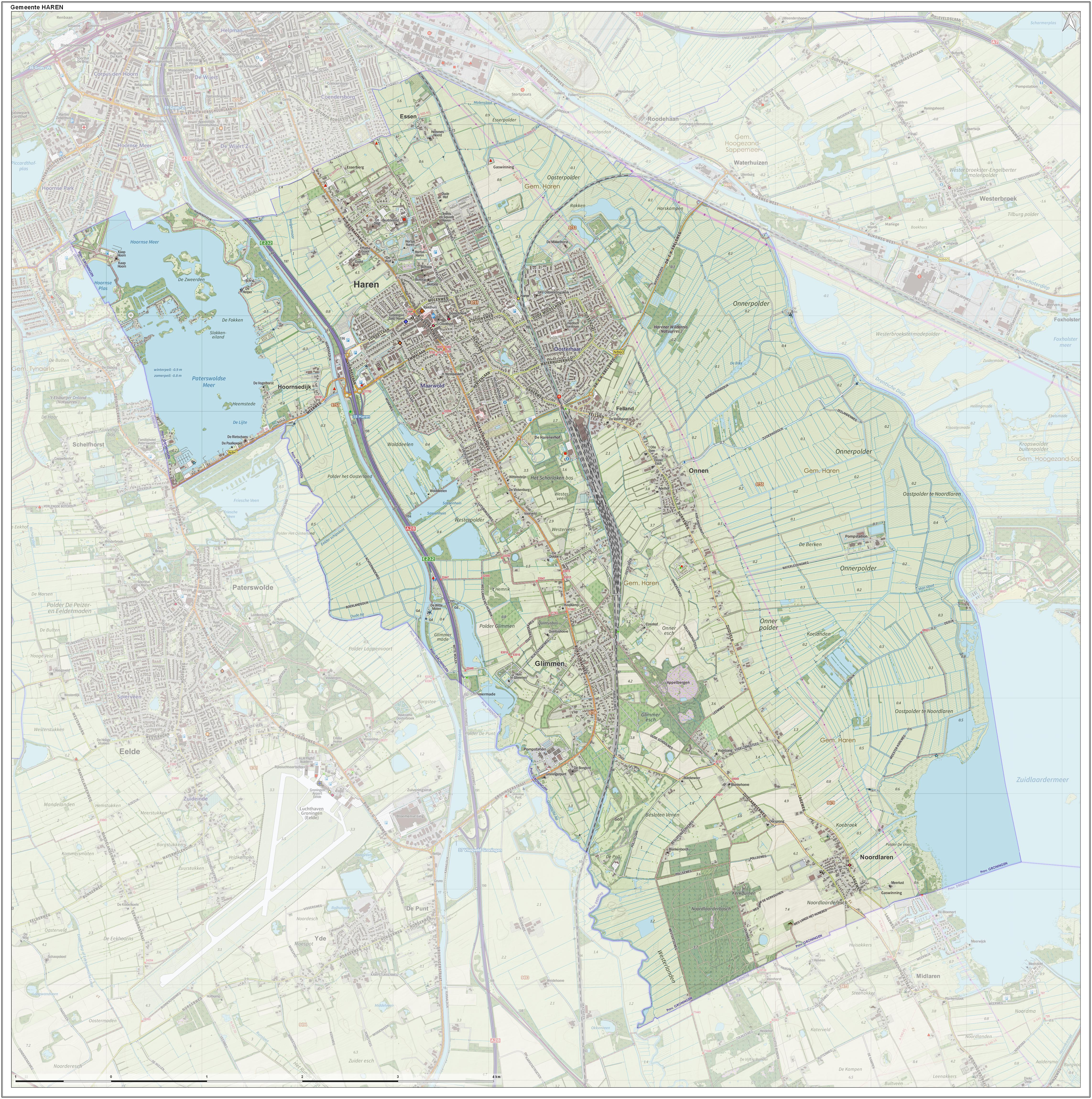
Map of Haren, June 2015

- Essen
- Felland
- Glimmen
- Haren
- Harendermolen
- Hoornsedijk
- Noordlaren
- Onnen
- Paterswolde (partly)

The town of Haren contains among others the following residential areas:

- Hemmen
- Maarwold
- Molenbuurt
- Oosterhaar
- Stationsbuurt
- Voorveld

== Transport ==
In addition to Haren railway station, there are regular bus services to and from Groningen, Assen and Emmen.

Groningen Airport Eelde is nearby, albeit with a limited number of regular international flight destinations. Leisure flights to different international destinations are scheduled throughout the year.

== Politics ==
The municipal council of Haren had 17 seats. The table below gives political party and seat counts since 1998.

Municipal council seats
Party	1998	2002	2006	2010	2014
D66	2	1	1	3	5
Common Sense Haren	-	-	-	2	3
VVD	5	5	4	4	2
CDA	3	4	3	2	2
PvdA	4	3	4	3	2
GreenLeft	2	3	4	2	2
ChristianUnion	1	1	1	1	1
Total	17	17	17	17	17

The last executive board consisted of VVD, PvdA and D66.

There was an election in November 2018 for the council of the newly expanded Groningen municipality that commenced work on 1 January 2019, replacing Haren council.

== Notable people ==
- Lammert Huitema (born 1961), speed skater and cyclist
