= De Poll =

Estate in Groningen, Netherlands

Coordinates: 53.12064°N 6.63162°E

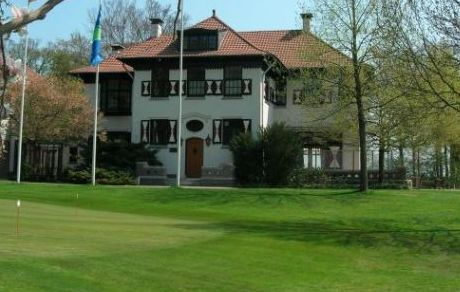
Villa De Poll, since 1953 the main building of the Noord-Nederlandse Golf & Country Club

De Poll, formerly De Pol, is an estate at Pollselaan 5 south of Glimmen in the municipality of Groningen, Netherlands. The estate is located in the valley of the Drentsche Aa. The golf course of the Noord-Nederlandse Golf & Country Club has been located on the estate since 1953. The estate is covered by the Dutch 'Natural Beauty Act' (Natuurschoonwet) of 1928 that provides tax benefits to owners, usufructuaries and leaseholders of country estates.

== History ==
There used to be an open heath named 'De Pol' on the site of the current estate. This field was deliberately kept open in order to be used as a natural barrier against enemy raids.

=== Estate ===
In the early 19th century this field was owned by deputy (for Groningen) Ludolph Theodorus van Hasselt. His son, tax collector Johan Conrad van Hasselt, sold this field in 1814 for merchant Abraham Hesselink, who apparently had become owner in the meantime, to pharmacist Herman Christiaan Reinders. Johan Coenraad van Hasselt had a house built there in 1816 and also had a park-like piece of pine forest planted there. He had the rest of the heath turned into arable land.

In 1824 Van Hasselt bought back the site, by then comprising 61 hectares. In the 1850s or 1860s, a large part was sold to the state railways for the construction of the Meppel–Groningen railway, opened in 1870.

In 1871, the Van Hasselt heirs, Maria van Bergen and his five children, sold the estate, described as "The De Poll Estate, consisting of spacious barns and cow sheds, a coach house and horse stables and a separate shed, avenues, canals, an orchard, lawn, cherry orchard, gardens, apple orchard, farmland, meadow, and hayfield, and pine woods altogether sized twenty-four bundles forty-two square rod and twenty-six square cubits." The buyers were Count Jean Baptiste Remy François Dumonceau de Bergendal (1827–1891) and his wife Countess Margarethe Catharina Ardesch. Dumonceau was director of a flax factory in Groningen (Schuitendiep, now the Vlasstraat) and was a son of Jean-Baptiste Dumonceau. Dumonceau had the house demolished and a new farmhouse built in the 1880s. This farm was used by the Hendriks family until 1920.

After Dumonceau's death, his widow sold the estate in 1893 to politician Willem Jacob Geertsema, whose brother Carel Coenraad already owned the nearby northern part of the Noordlaarderbos. The estate then had a size of more than 40 hectares. After Geertsema's death in 1902, his widow Antoinette Adelaïde Du Rij van Beest Holle inherited the estate.

In 1920 the farmhouse became the residence of the Honebeeke family. In 1971 Johan Willem Honebeeke moved there with his wife and younger brother Albert. Later, the farm was transformed into a workshop and storage space for the greenkeepers.

==== Plans for a mental asylum ====
In 1888 the Municipality of Groningen considered using part of the estate for a 'cottage asylum' that would serve as the central shelter for the 'insane' in the provinces of Groningen and Drenthe. In 1890 the architect Egbertus Gerhardus Wentink (1843–1911) made a design for 250 residents with a main building, 'economy building', six pavilions, hospital barracks, two work sheds and a morgue. The following year, negotiations were held with Dumanceau to purchase the site and surrounding parcels from other owners. The negotiations broke down and the plan was eventually realized in Loosduinen.

In 1901, the construction was discussed again, and went finally off the table. As a result, the estate retained its function.

=== Construction of the villa ===
Between 1913 and 1914, the son of Du Rij van Beest Holle, banker Johan Herman Geertsema Willemszoon, had a villa built with a beautiful view over the Drentsche Aa and the adjacent stream valley, the Westerlanden. This plastered villa with chalet elements was built designed by the architect Gerrit Nijhuis. Nijhuis also designed the accompanying gardener's house (Pollseweg 3). The house was given the name De Pol.

In 1915, when Geertsema moved in from his previous home, villa Blankeweer, this became De Poll. A private driveway was also laid out in front of the house during construction, which was later moved to the south. Geertsema only lived there for two years; In 1917 he sold the house to the Groningen coffee trader Willem Onnes, who later changed his name to Willem Rost Onnes.

=== Golf course ===
==== 1950s–1960s ====
After the death of Rost Onnes's wife, Meta Dorothea Ludmilla Koenig, he sold the 40-hectare estate in 1952 to the Noord-Nederlandse Golf & Country Club. This golf club was founded in 1950 and initially played at a field near Eelde Airport. These 60 hectares are bordered on the east by two nature reserves: 'Westerlanden' and 'Besloten Venen', and on the west by the Drentsche Aa and an old railway from 1871. The course, initially 9 holes, on the De Poll estate was designed by Sir Guy Campbell and opened in 1954. This took up 42 ha.

The golf club subsequently converted the site into a golf course designed by Scottish architect Sir Guy Campbell. It had a 9 hole golf course built on the site. The construction was carried out by 60 unemployed workers of the Works Implementation Service. Because the intention was to help as many people as possible to find work, the work was mainly carried out by manual labour. Many pine trees had to be cut down for the construction, but a large number of spruce trees were also planted in return. The golf course was opened in 1954 by the Queen's Commissioner Edzo Hommo Ebels. The house of Rost Onnes was transformed into the new clubhouse of the golf club.

==== 1970s–1980s ====
During the 1977 Dutch train hijacking at De Punt, a command post was set up in the clubhouse, where 40 soldiers and marines camped.

In 1984 the estate was expanded by 13 hectares, on which the golf course was expanded to 18 holes, designed by architect Frank Pennink.

During construction, a piece of forest with remainders of a pingo was purchased in 1986. During the expansion of the new holes, 3 hectares of coniferous forest were converted into deciduous forest and another 5 hectares of deciduous forest were planted. The new golf course was opened in 1987 by the Queen's Commissioner Henk Vonhoff. The opening was supposed to be by the Queen's husband, Prince Bernhard, who canceled last minute.

==== 1990s–present ====
In 1991 the clubhouse was expanded. In 1992 another 3.3 ha was purchased from a neighbor, after which the golf course was optimized until 1998 according to a design by architect Donald Steel.

In 1998, an additional 3.3 hectares were purchased. With Donald Steel, changes were then made to optimize the layout of the track. The holes are located in woods and on some meadows and part of the course is located in a park landscape with many rhododendrons.
