= Noord-Nederlandse Golf & Country Club =

Golf club in Groningen, Netherlands

Coordinates: 53.12064°N 6.63162°E

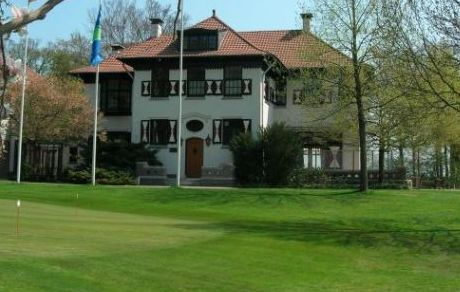
- Interactive map of Noord-Nederlandse Golf & Country Club

Club information
- Location: Glimmen, Groningen, Netherlands
- Tota holes: 18
- Website: nngcc.nl
- Designed by: Sir Guy Campbell
- Designed by: Frank Pennink
- Designed by: Donald Steel
- Par: 72
- Length: 5709 meters
- Course rating: 127

The Noord-Nederlandse Golf & Country Club (abbreviated NNG&CC, Dutch for Golf & Country Club of the Northern Netherlands) is located on the historical De Poll estate in Groningen, Netherlands. The site is known for its beauty and is covered by the Dutch national 'Natural Beauty Act' (Natuurschoonwet).

== History ==
=== 1950s–1960s ===
The Noord-Nederlandse Golf & Country Club was founded in 1950. It was the first Dutch golf club to be established after World War II. From, members and guest played in a field next to Eelde Airport, zoned and soon needed for the airport's development. Founding chairman was Syb Nijhoff. Kees Poll led the physical construction of the temporary golf course in Eelde.

In 1952 Willem Rost Onnes sold his country estate De Poll near Glimmen to the golf club. These 60 hectares are bordered on the east by two nature reserves: 'Westerlanden' and 'Besloten Venen', and on the west by the Drentsche Aa and the Meppel–Groningen railway.

The course, initially 9 holes, on the De Poll estate was designed by Sir Guy Colin Campbell and opened in 1954. This took up 42 ha. The golf course was opened in 1954 by the Queen's Commissioner Edzo Hommo Ebels. The house of Rost Onnes was transformed into the new clubhouse of the golf club. In 1957, Nijhoff was replaced as chairman.

Since 1960, NNG&CC organizes the annual Tromp Cup. The Tromp Cup later also became the Dutch Junior Championship Stroke Play.

==== 1970s–1980s ====
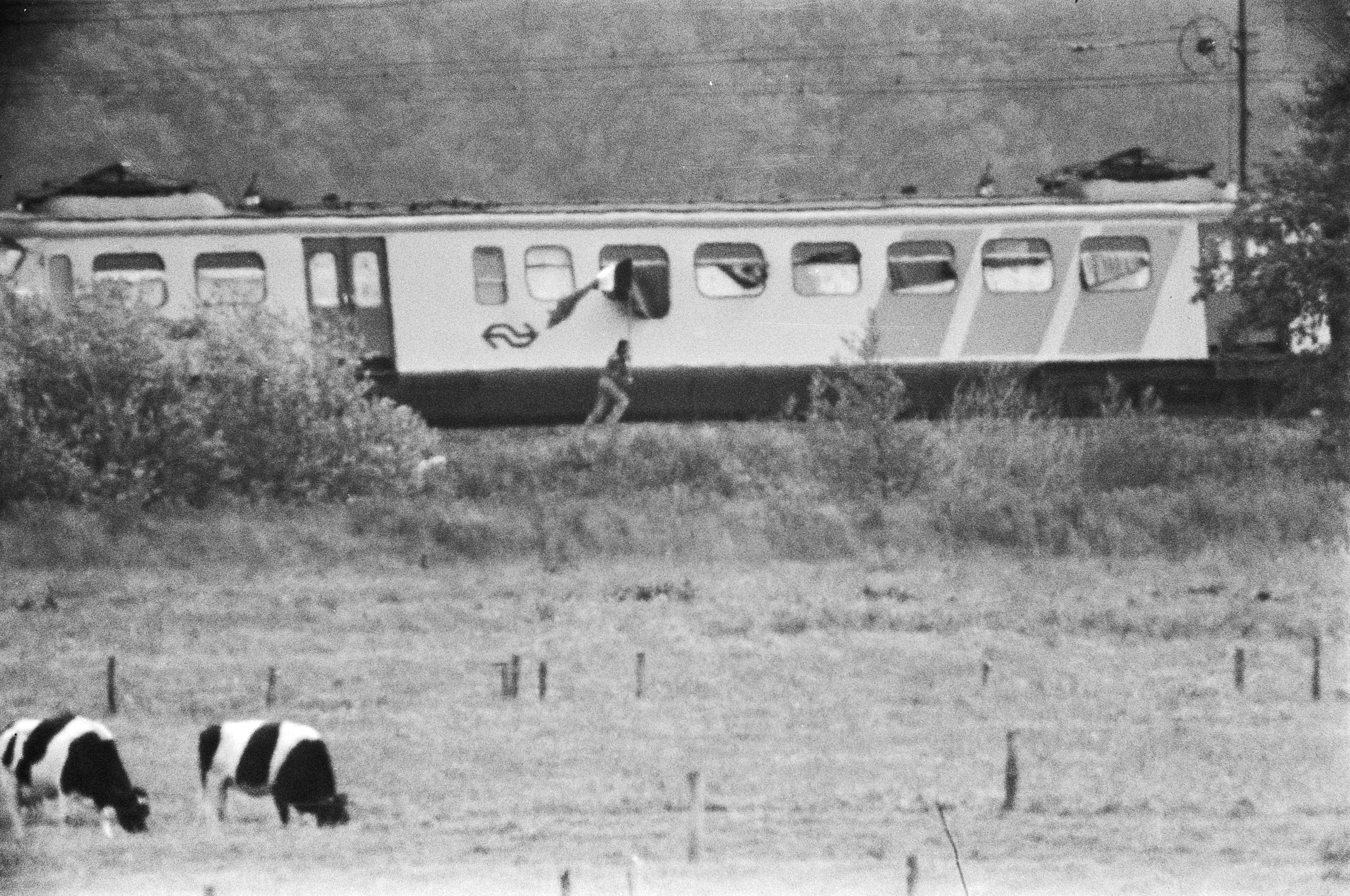
The 1977 Dutch train hijacking at De Punt, seen from the direction of the NNG&CC

During the 1977 Dutch train hijacking at De Punt, a command post was set up in the clubhouse, where 40 soldiers and marines camped.

In 1984 the estate was expanded by 13 hectares, on which the golf course was expanded to 18 holes, designed by architect Frank Pennink. During construction, a piece of forest with remainders of a pingo was purchased in 1986. During the expansion of the new holes, 3 hectares of coniferous forest were converted into deciduous forest and another 5 hectares of deciduous forest were planted. The new golf course was opened in 1987 by the Queen's Commissioner Henk Vonhoff. The opening was supposed to be by the Queen's husband, Prince Bernhard, who canceled last moment.

==== 1990s–present ====
In 1991 the clubhouse was expanded. In 1992 another 3.3 ha was purchased from a neighbor, after which the golf course was optimized until 1998 according to a design by architect Donald Steel. The holes are located in woods and on some meadows and part of the course is located in a park landscape with many rhododendrons.

Due to the popularity of the course, in 2006 there was a minimum handicap requirement of 30 in the weekends.

In the 2009 Tromp Cup, Reinier Saxton's track record of 67 was lowered to 66 by the winner, Willem Vork.
