= Midlaren =

- Village
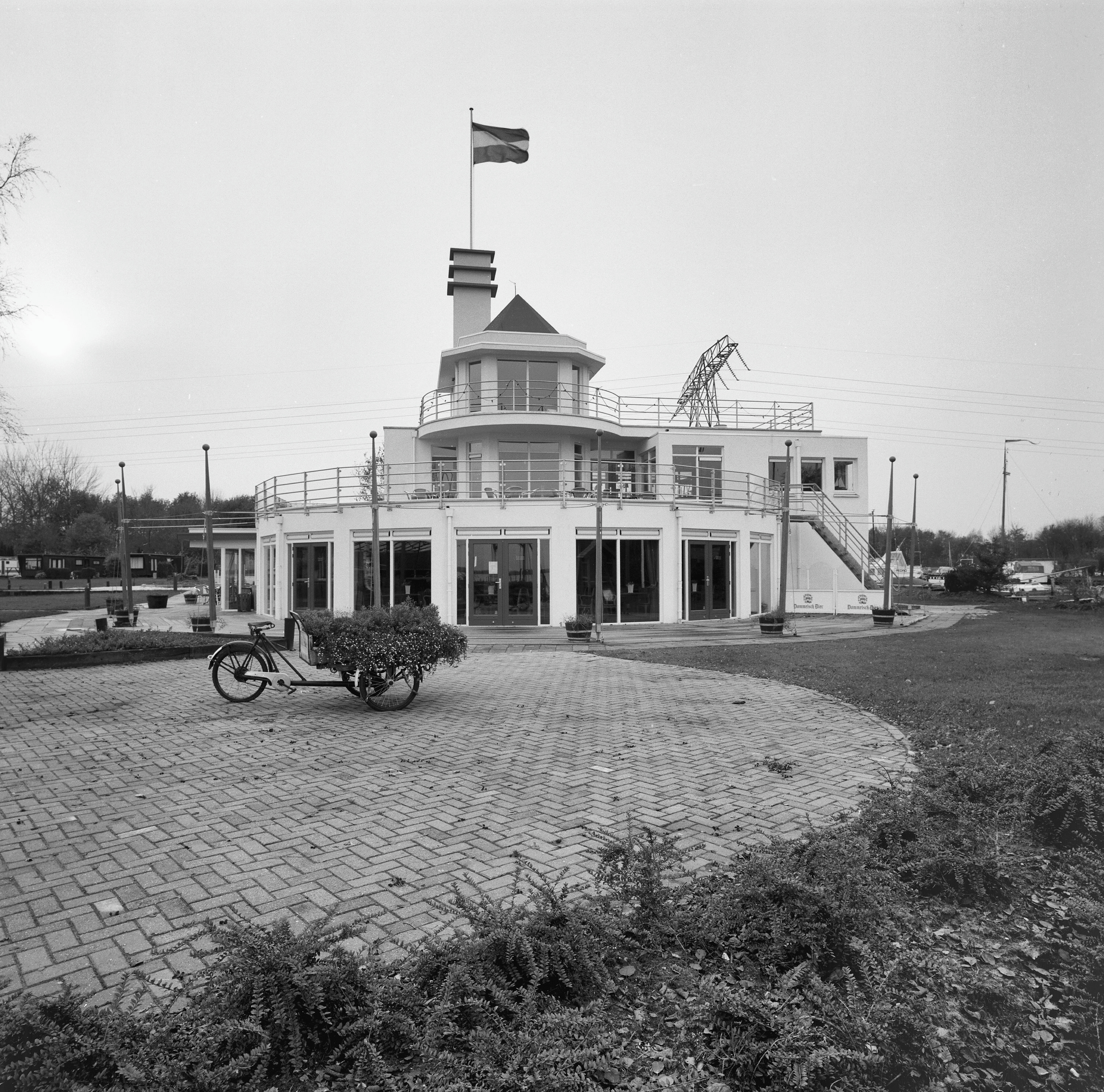
- Pavilion De Bloemert

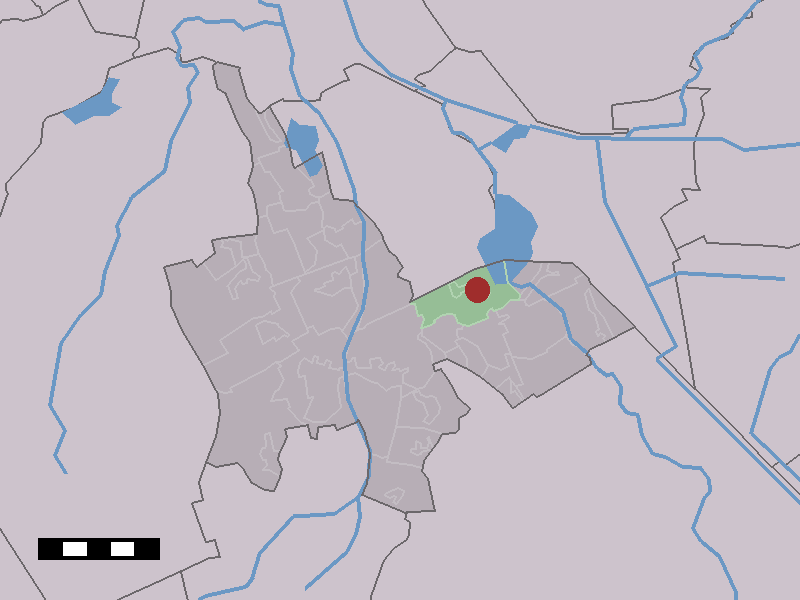
- The village (dark red) and the statistical district (light green) of Midlaren in the municipality of Tynaarlo.

- Location in the province of Drenthe Midlaren (Netherlands)
- Coordinates: 53.10994°N 6.67750°E
- Country: Netherlands
- Province: Drenthe
- Municipality: Tynaarlo

Area
  - Total: 6.95 km^{2} (2.68 sq mi)
- Elevation: 3.7 m (12 ft)

Population (2021)
  - Total: 345
  - Density: 49.6/km^{2} (129/sq mi)
- Time zone: UTC+1 (CET)
  - Summer (DST): UTC+2 (CEST)
- Postal code: 9475
- Dialing code: 050

Midlaren is a village in the Dutch province of Drenthe. It is a part of the municipality of Tynaarlo, and lies about 14 km southeast of Groningen.

== History ==
The village was first mentioned between 1298 and 1304 as "in Middelare". Mid (middle) has been added to distinguish between Noordlaren and Zuidlaren. In the 12th century, "tribus Laribus" was recorded which means "the three Larens". "Laar" means "open forest". Midlaren is an esdorp without a church which developed in the Early Middle Ages. There are remains of two brinks (village squares).

Midlaren was home to 73 people in 1840. Pavilion De Bloemert was built in 1935 in functionalist style in reinforced concrete. The summer residence Villa Meerwijk was destroyed by fire in 1945 and only the park remains.

== Dolmen ==
There are two hunebedden (dolmen) in Midlaren. D3 and D4 are a pair located next to farms on a public road. They are near complete: all the capstones are present and only two side stones are missing. They have never been restored, however some cracks have been filled in with concrete. They are photogenic dolmen due to the nearby farms and the oak trees which overshadow the stones. One farm was purchased by Het Drentse Landschap in 2001, and in 2003, pottery and artefacts were discovered under the floor of the barn.

== Gallery ==
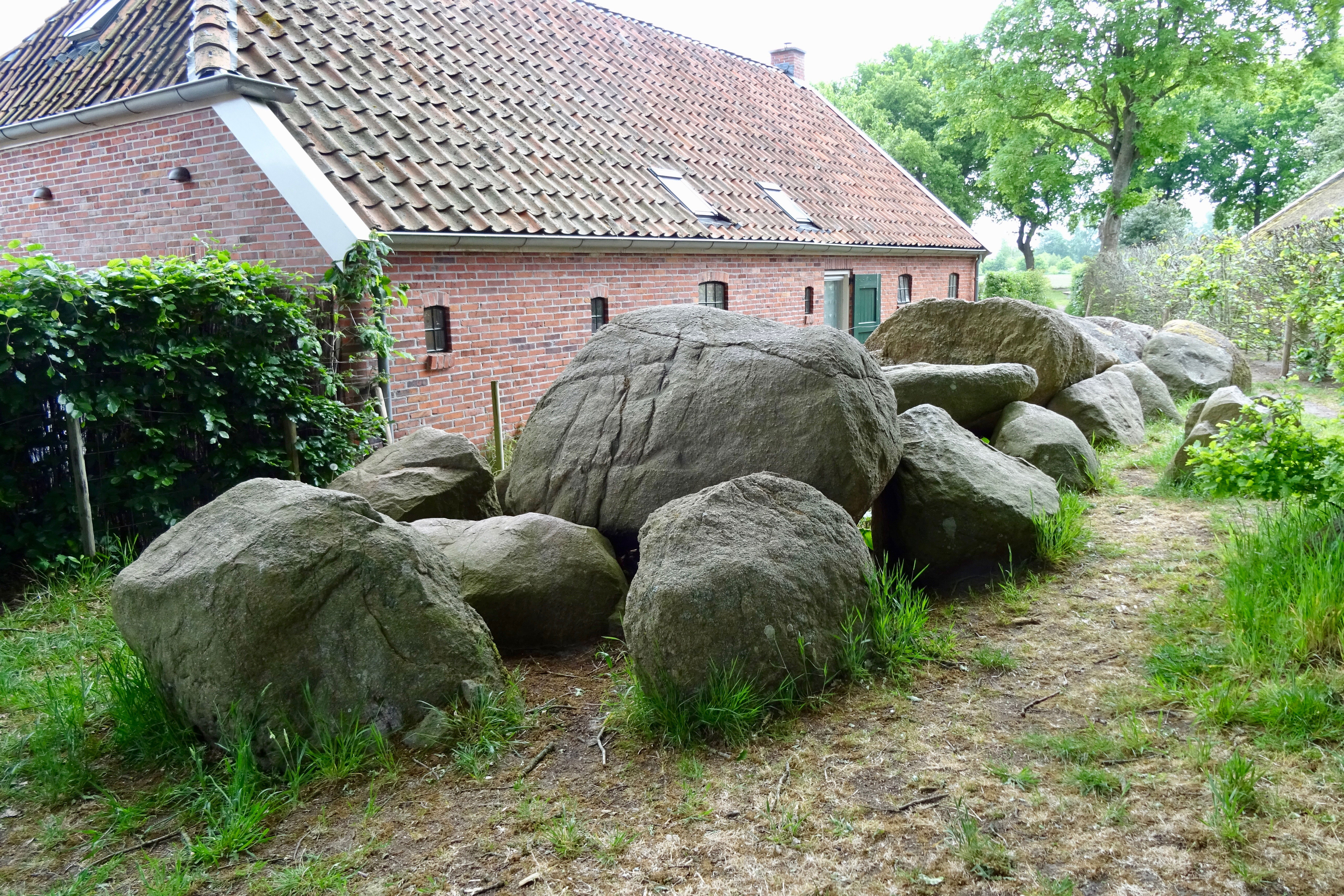
Hunebed in Midlaren

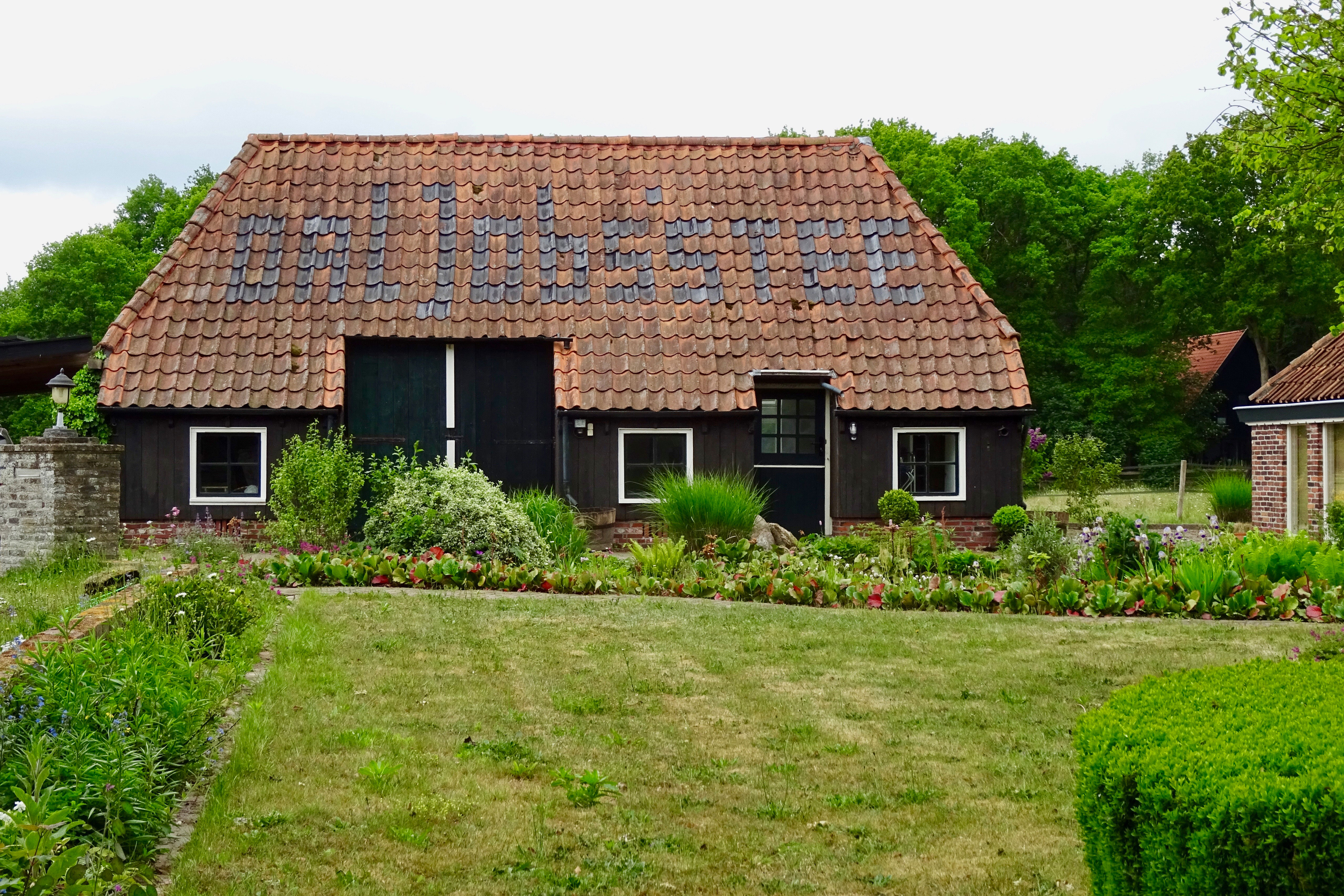
Farm in Midlaren

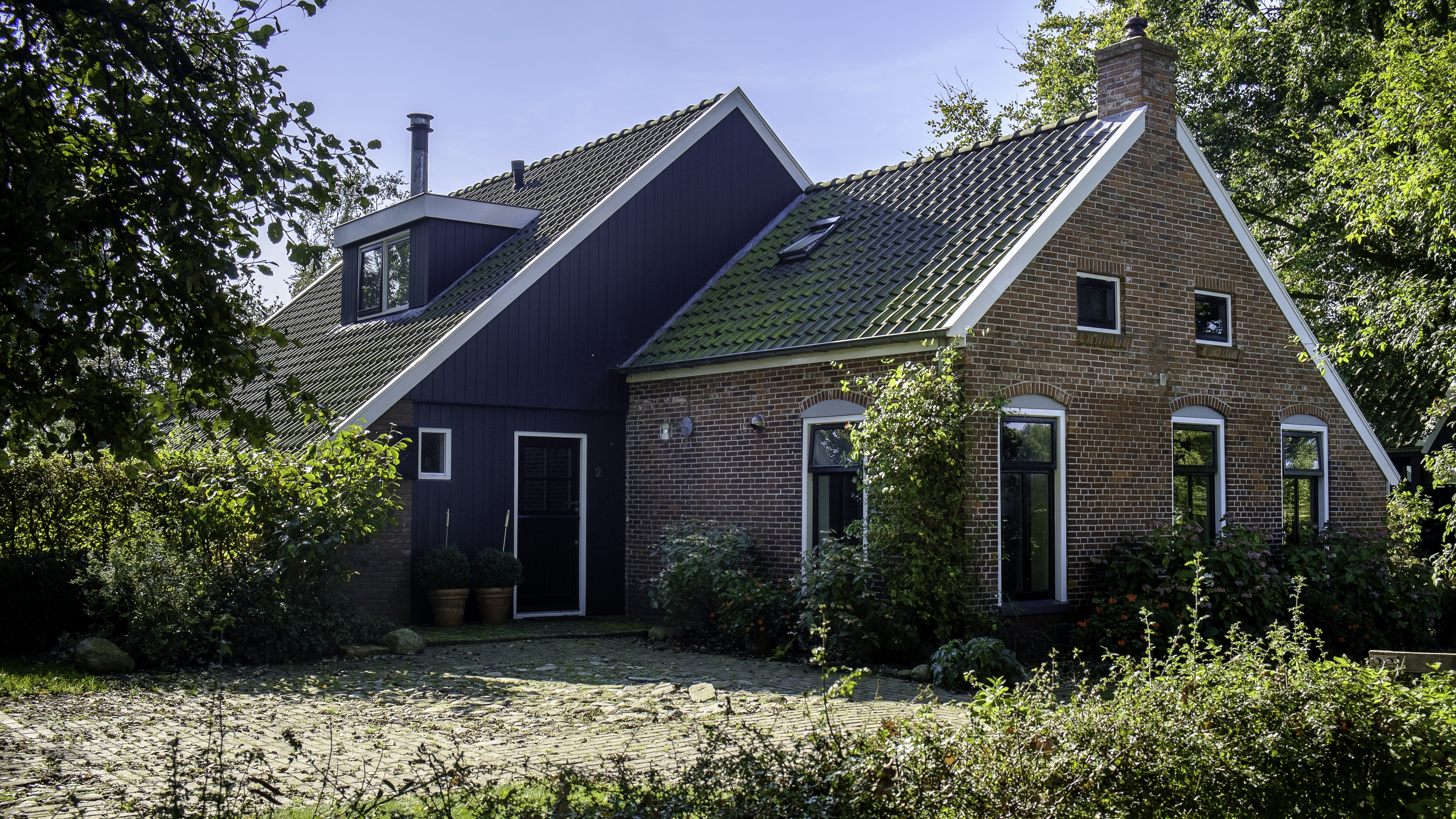
Farm in Midlaren

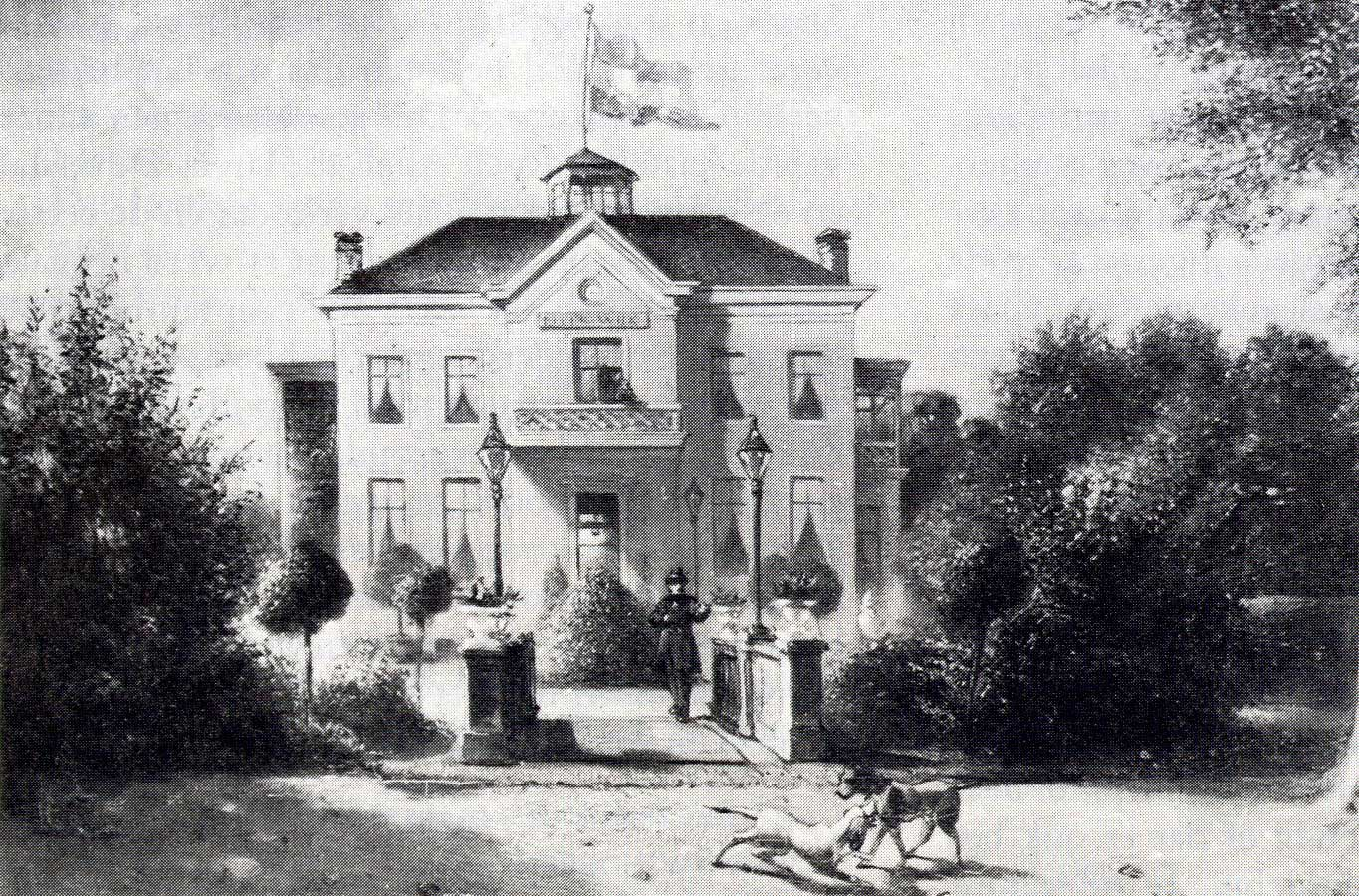
Villa Meerwijk (1861)
