= Noordlaren =

- Village
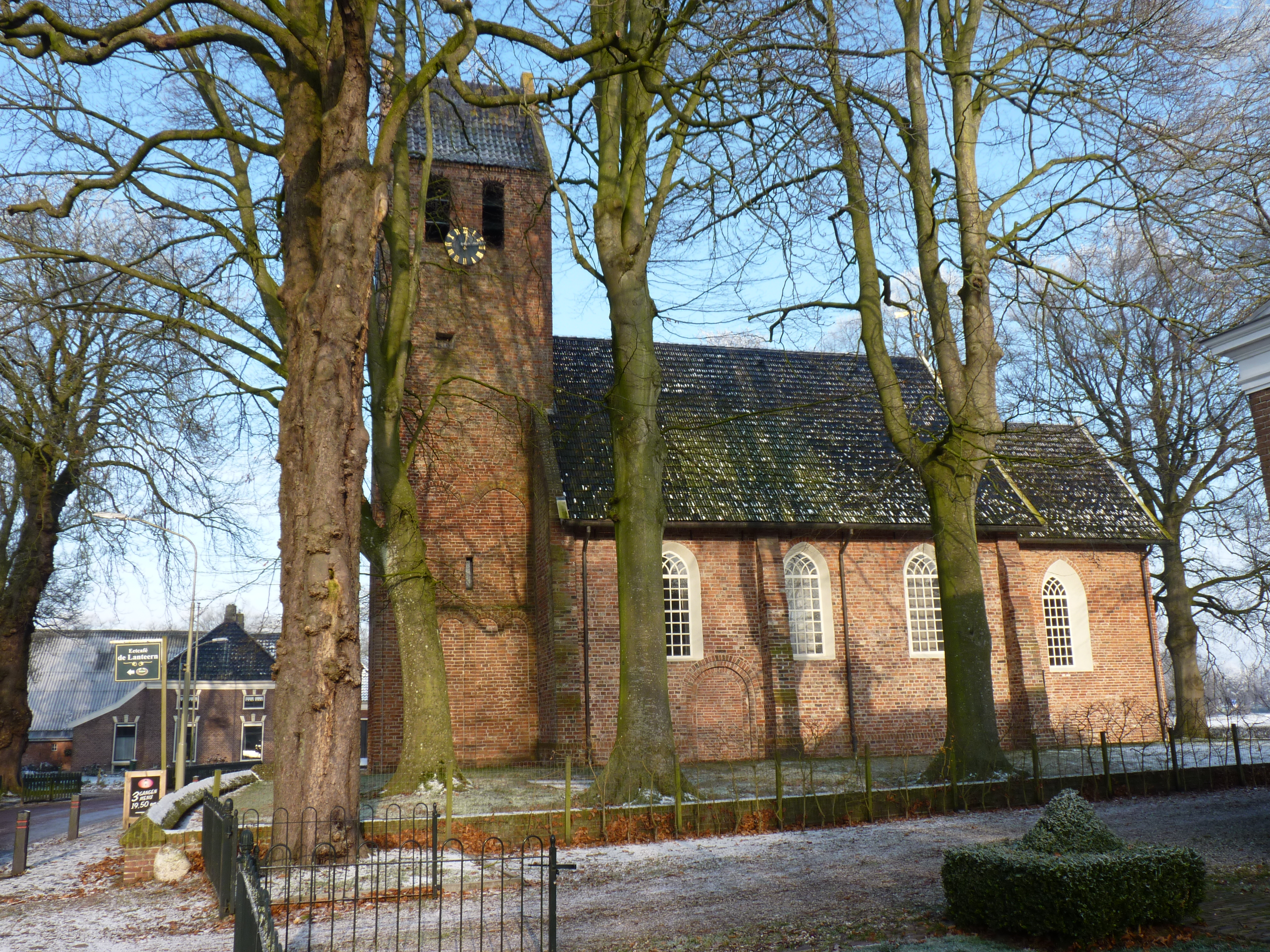
- St Bartholomew Church

- Flag

- Location of the village in the province of Groningen Noordlaren (Netherlands)
- Coordinates: 53°7′15″N 6°40′1″E
- Country: Netherlands
- Province: Groningen
- Municipality: Groningen

Area
  - Total: 6.92 km^{2} (2.67 sq mi)
- Elevation: 2.9 m (9.5 ft)

Population (2021)
  - Total: 545
  - Density: 78.8/km^{2} (204/sq mi)
- Time zone: UTC+1 (CET)
  - Summer (DST): UTC+2 (CEST)
- Postal code: 9479
- Dialing code: 050
- Website: www.noordlaren.eu

Noordlaren is a village in the municipality of Groningen in the Dutch province of Groningen. It had a population of around 545 in 2021.

In 2010 it was said to be 850 years old. In the past Noordlaren was a farming village. Nowadays there are still a few farmers in Noordlaren, but there are also many people from outside the village, that came to live in Noordlaren, because of the beautiful nature and rest.

Notable locations in the village include the wind mill which still operates to produce flour and the eight centuries old church.

== History ==
The village was first mentioned in 1254 as Northlare, (Note: In 1160, it was mentioned as tribus laribus (three Larens) by Werden Abbey, however the villages were not mentioned individually.) and means "northern pasture". North has been added to distinguish between Midlaren and Zuidlaren. Noordlaren is an esdorp which developed on the eastern flank of the Hondsrug and has been known to exist since at least 1160.

There is a hunebed (dolmen) near the village dating from around 2,500 BC. Two capstones remain, however most of the stones have been removed before 1769. The choir of the Dutch Reformed church probably dates from the end of the 12th century. The church was enlarged in the 15th century and the tower was heightened. It was restored in 1976. The grist mill Korenschoof was built in 1849. In 1940, it was bought by the municipality of Haren and restored between 1972 and 1973. It is still occasionally in service, and is used as an exam for millers.

Noordlaren was home to 378 people in 1840. In 2018, remnants of the medieval castle were discovered near Noordlaren which were built around 1400 by the Bishop of Utrecht. In 2019, it became part of the municipality of Groningen.

== Speedskating village ==
Noordlaren is known in the Netherlands because of the ice rink behind the primary school. Every year, the little village tries to organise the annual national skating marathon with the goal of being the first place in the country to hold a skating marathon on natural ice that year.

== Gallery ==
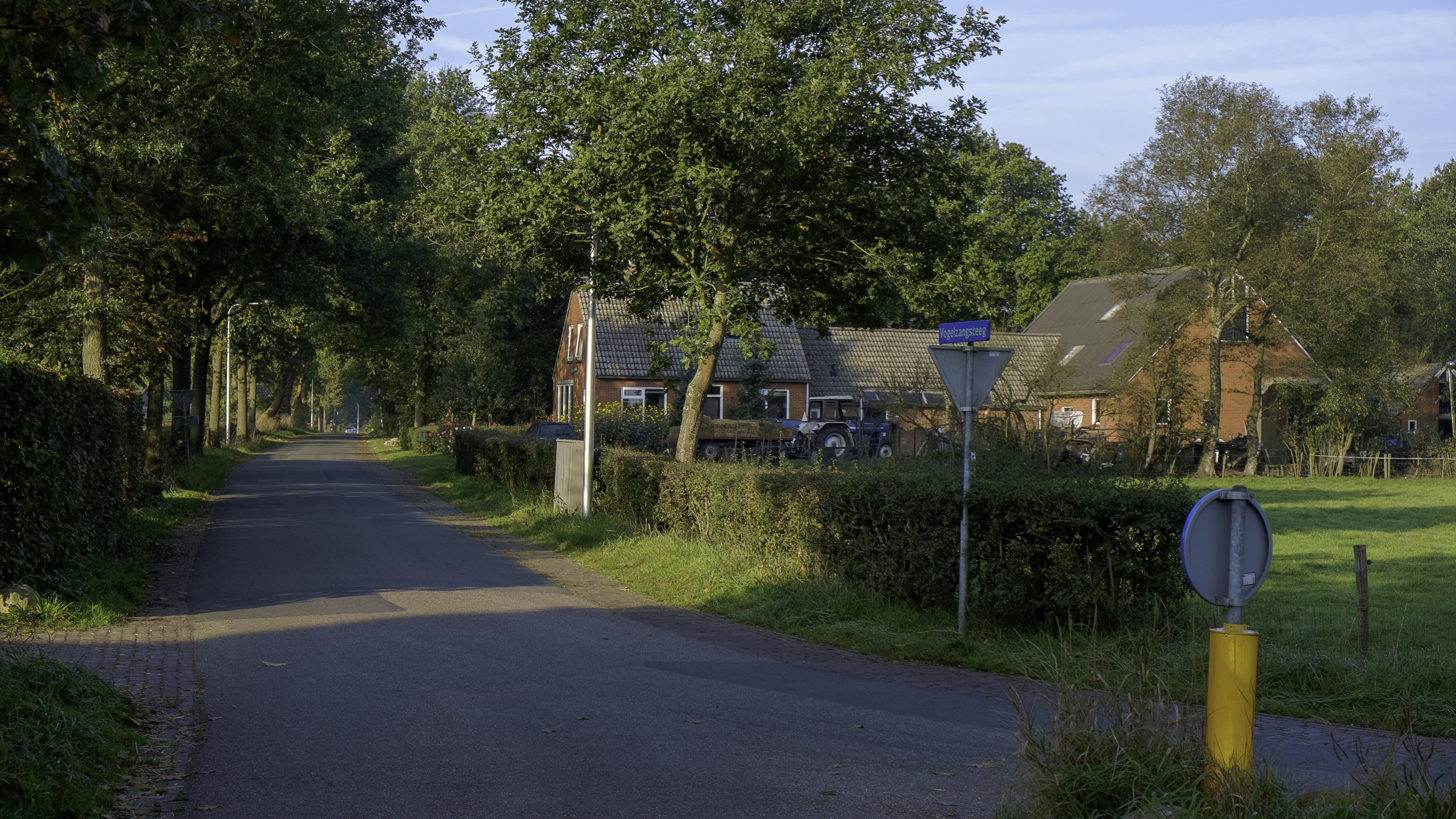
Street in Noordlaren

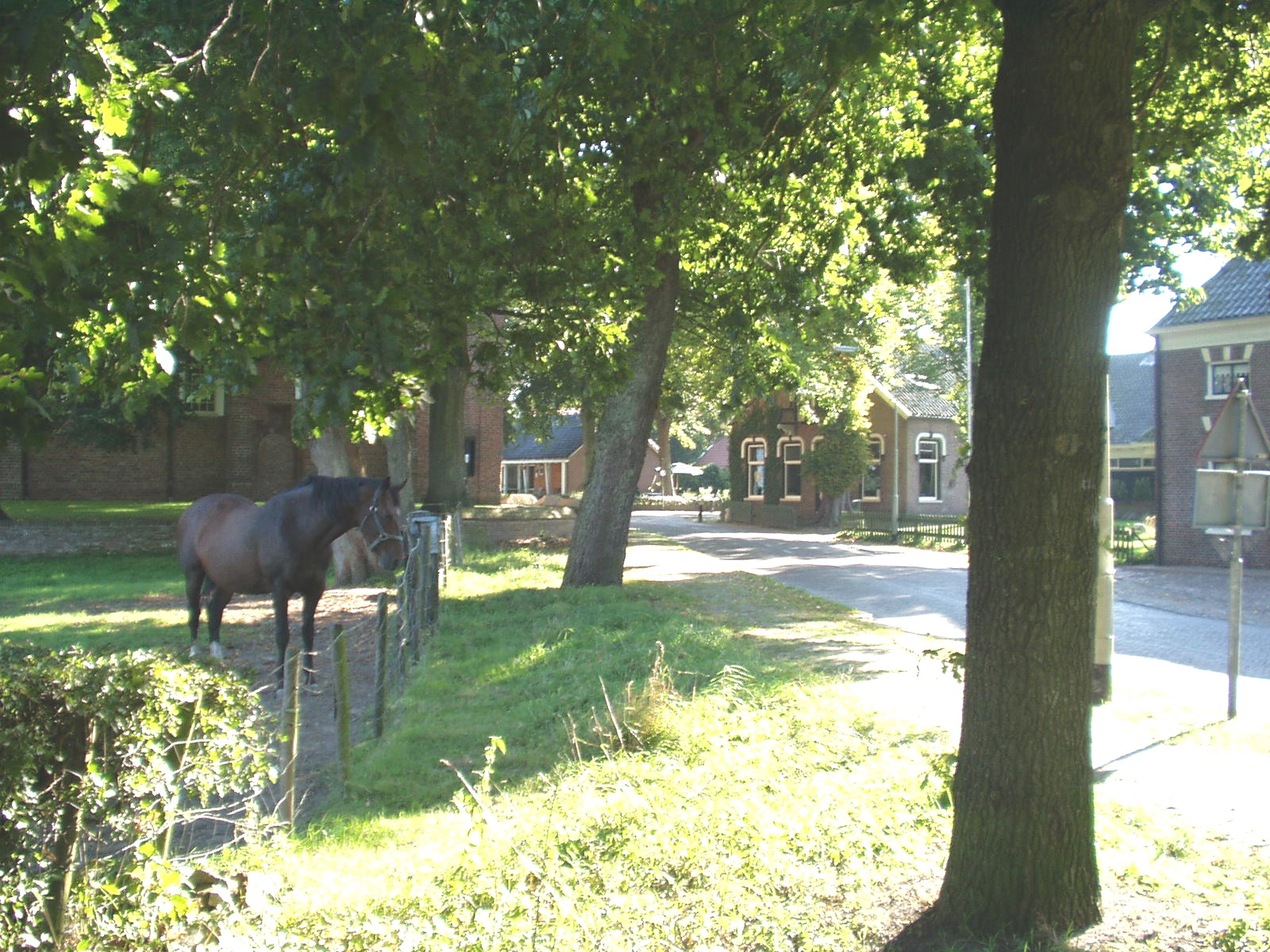
Horse in the brink (communal pasture)

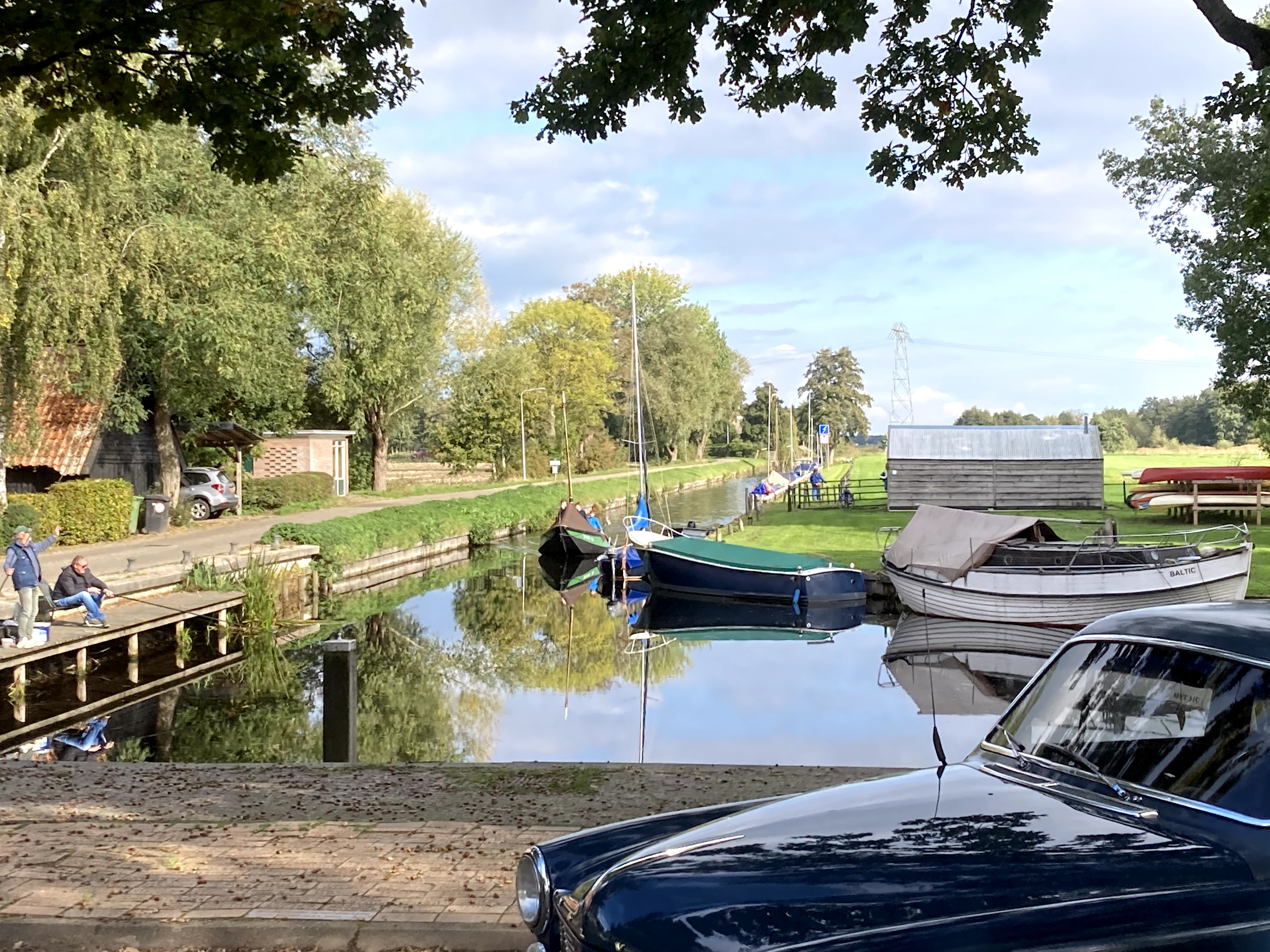
Harbour of Noordlaren

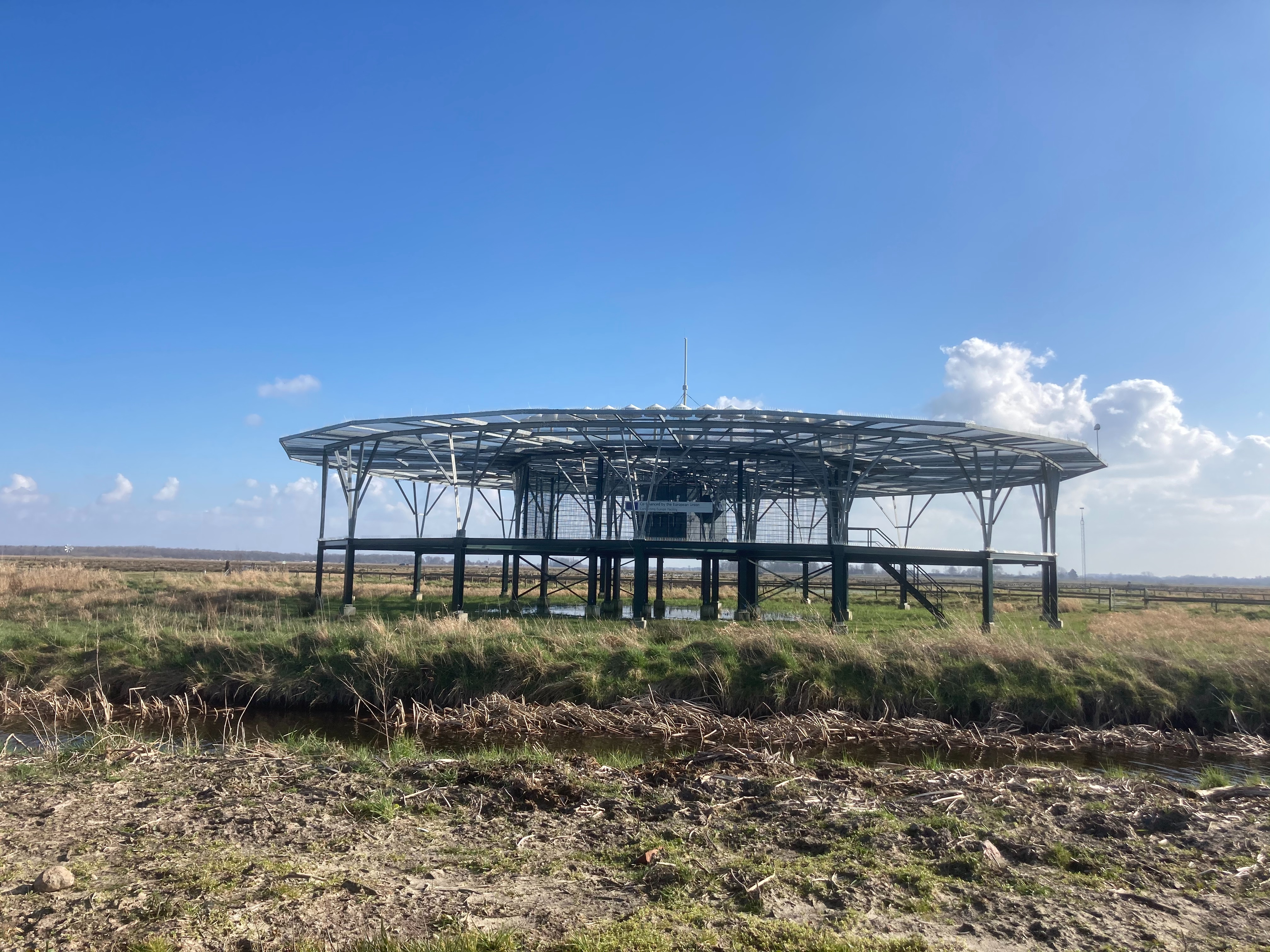
Radio beacon near Noordlaren
