= De Punt fire =

Fire responsible for the death of 3 fire fighters in the Dutch village of De Punt

Coordinates: 53°07′23″N 6°36′16″E

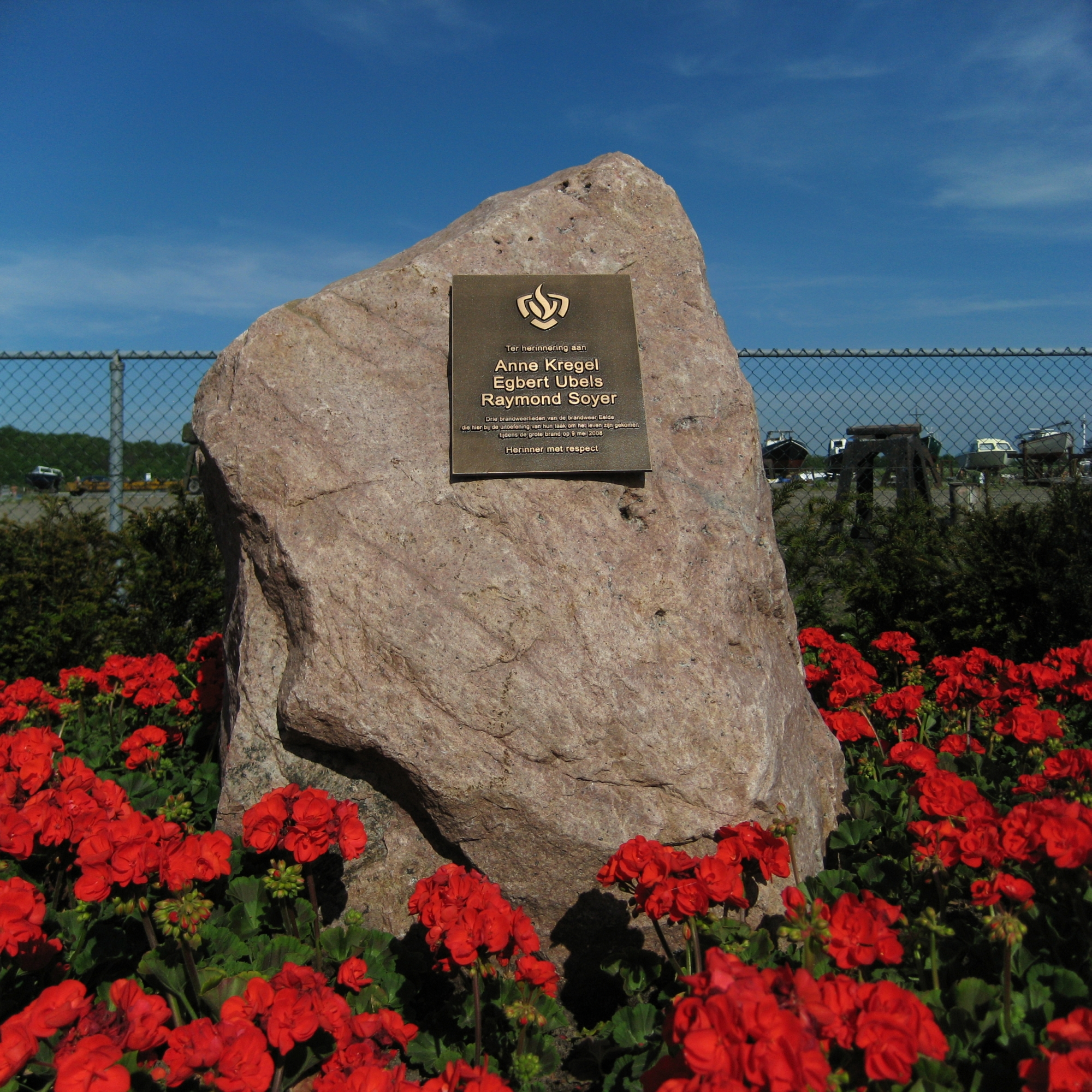
Memorial.

On 9 May 2008, three Dutch firefighters lost their lives tackling a blaze at a large commercial building situated in a shipyard in the village of De Punt in the Dutch province of Drenthe. The firefighters, Anne Kregel, Raymond Soyer and Egbert Ubels entered the building not knowing that a layer of highly combustible smoke and gas had built up under the roof. This ignited, resulting in a sudden spread of the fire accompanied by a major explosion that resulted in their deaths.

== The Inquiry ==
The municipal authority requested that the Vereniging voor Brandweerzorg en Rampenbestrijding (Dutch Association for Fire Service and Disaster Relief) form an independent Committee of Inquiry. The Committee of Inquiry has not given an opinion on the exact cause of the fire, but has made a number of provisional conclusions. Many of these relate to the materials used in the construction of the building, whose roof was made of so-called sandwich insulation panels containing polyurethane foam insulation. Built with steel supporting construction the side walls of the building were made largely of profiled steel plate and the lower sections consisted of cavity wall. The roof was built using coated sandwich panels, consisting of two steel plates 0.4 to 0.5 mm thick, with an intermediate layer of polyurethane foam (PUR) 9 cm thick, serving as insulation.

The committee reported:

“The sandwich panels used for the roof construction meet the legal requirements for this type of building with regard to the flammability and/or fire development. However, they do bring a huge danger. When heated the polyurethane will produce gases and smoke which may lead to an unexpected and quick spread of fire. Although the dangers of sandwich constructions have been previously acknowledged during fire hazard testing and fire practice, they are not known throughout the fire service.”

These panels comply with the legal requirements that apply to such a building with regard to flammability and/or the spread of a fire, but at the same time they also present a major risk: if the panels are sufficiently heated, the polyurethane present will lead to gas emission, flammable and toxic fumes will be released. These fumes include ammonia, hydrocyanic acid, and nitrous fumes. The nitrous fumes have a characteristic yellow-brown colour. Initially, these fumes are released at the edges of the panels, but they also build up inside the sandwich panels themselves.

The polyurethane foam also serves as the “glue” holding both steel plates together and adding stiffness to the construction. Upon being heated, the foam will soon separate from the steel plates, which are then no longer connected to each other. If a sufficiently concentrated layer of these fumes is present, it can be ignited by an external source and start burning. If polyurethane foam actually burns, it releases a greasy black smoke.

== The Conclusion ==
“The Committee of Inquiry concludes that during the first minutes the polyurethane from the roof construction was the main fuel for the fire.”

— NVBR independent inquiry conclusion on the De Punt fire.

The investigative committee made a number of recommendations regarding procedural changes that should be implemented by the Netherlands fire brigade. The investigating committee concluded that the rescue and recovery attempts that took place were not sufficiently coordinated. The most important reason for this is the absence of an effective and well-practiced procedure for dealing with missing firefighters and the fact that fire brigade officers are not selected, trained and drilled to ensure that they can actually tilt the balance by acting as a “technical fire fighting manager” particularly in such situations.

In addition, the investigative committee concluded that there is only one possible and necessary solution: in industrial buildings where there are no requirements regarding fire safety, the usual deployment procedure must be reversed: if a fire breaks out in such an object, the approach taken should be based on a defensive attack from the outside. Only if sufficient extra units and security is available, can a decision be taken, in exceptional situations, to launch an attack from the inside.

The report concluded that the fatal fire that took place on 9 May 2008 at De Punt should challenge and encourage the Dutch fire fighting authorities to again invest on an ongoing basis in its core activity, namely professional expertise when it comes to fighting fires. Stating this incident was not simply a case of “normal professional risk” but rather an avoidable incident. In the opinion of the investigative committee, the fire officers involved acted correctly. On the whole, they acted in accordance with the applicable procedures and were not aware of the risk involved.

According to the investigative committee, increased investments must be made in fire fighting knowledge and expertise and in the modification of existing procedures, study materials, and training as well as relevant related exercises.
