= NedTrain =

- Company type: State-owned company
- Industry: Rail Transport
- Founded: 1938
- Headquarters: Utrecht, Netherlands
- Key people: Karel Noordzij, CEO
- Products: Rail Transport maintenance
- Number of employees: 3,500
- Website: NedTrain

NedTrain are the locomotive and rolling stock maintenance and repair company of Nederlandse Spoorwegen.

== History ==
Always historically part of Nederlandse Spoorwegen, NedTrain's history closely follows that of its parent company and main customer. In the early 1990s under European Union Directive 91/440, which included the need for formal separation of the national railways from Governments and into a two separate companies, one which deals with the infrastructure, and the other which deals with the transport activities; NS began to be separated into separate divisions. NedTrain was formed at this point, not only to comply with the EU Directive and NS's strategy, but also to take advantage of the Dutch Government's desire to create competition in both passenger and freight transport by offering an "independent" locomotive and rolling stock maintenance and repair facility.

Although much of the reorganisation of NS was reversed in 2002 when new CEO Karel Noordzij was put in place, and NS being granted by the Dutch Government the sole concession to run on the main passenger lines until 2015, NedTrain had built up enough non-NS business to remain owned by a separate division of NS.

== NedTrain Consulting ==
In October 2006, the Lloyd’s Register Group acquired the 230 employee subsidiary NedTrain Consulting (NTC), the rolling stock Centre of Competence which covers whole life cycle of rolling stock and its systems.

== Locations ==
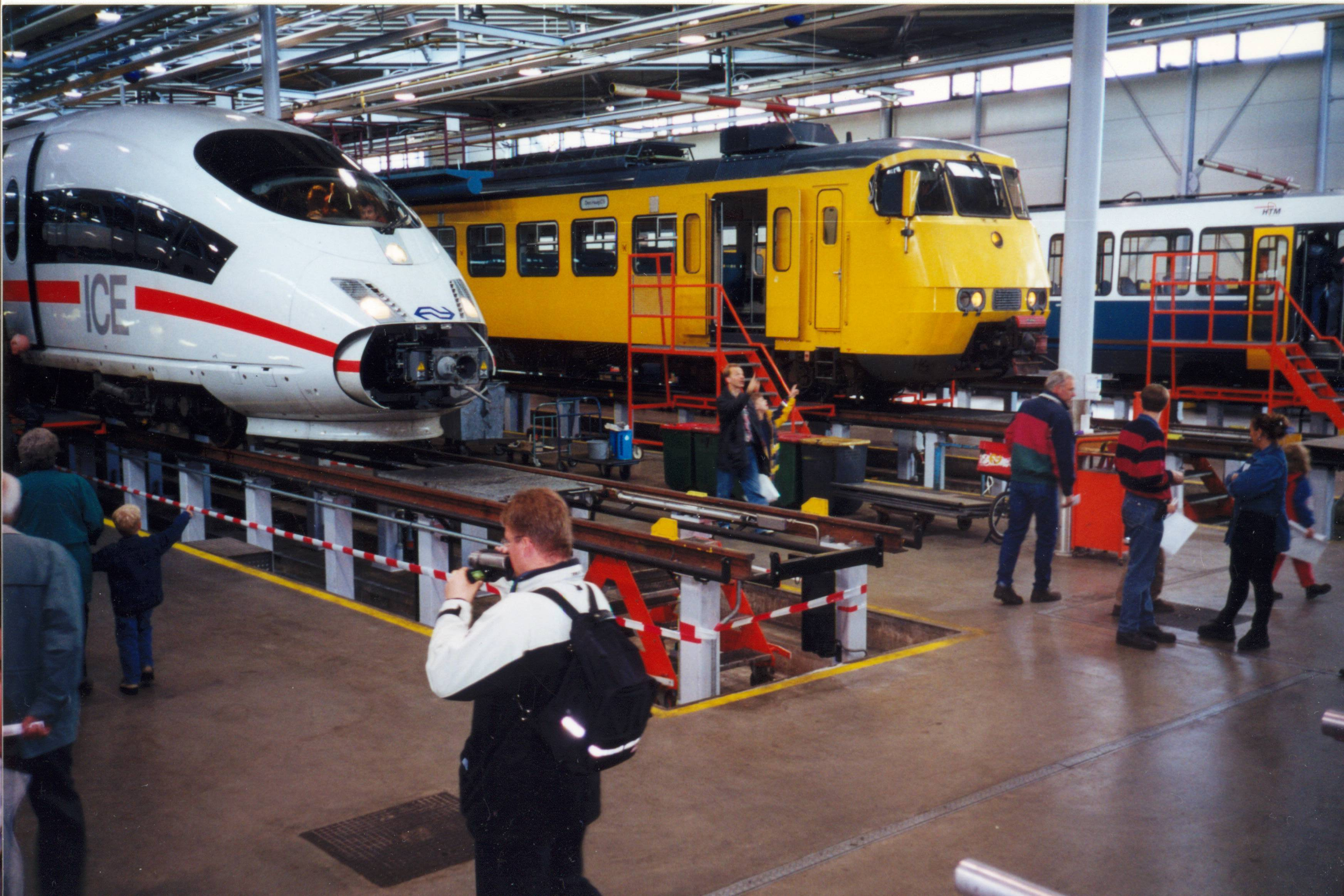
NedTrain facilities, showing outsourced ICE train under maintenance

=== Refurbishment & Overhaul ===
- Haarlem
- Tilburg

=== NedTrain Services ===
- Amsterdam
- Eindhoven
- Hengelo
- Leidschendam
- Maastricht
- Onnen
- Rotterdam
- Zwolle
- Alkmaar
- Zandvoort
