= Essen, Groningen =

- Hamlet
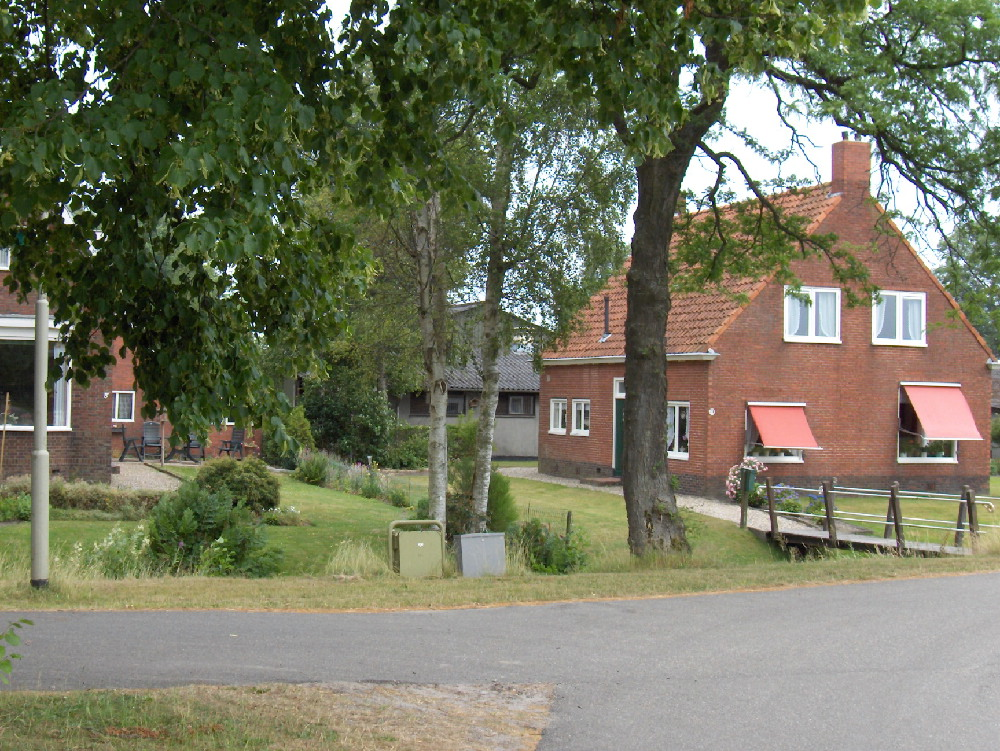

- Location of Essen in the province of Groningen Essen, Groningen (Netherlands)
- Coordinates: 53°11′27″N 6°36′10″E
- Country: Netherlands
- Province: Groningen
- Municipality: Groningen

Essen is a small hamlet in the municipality of Groningen in the province of Groningen. It lies between the city of Groningen and the village of Haren.

In 1215 a monastery was founded in Essen (or Yesse). It existed until 1594. During the Protestant Reformation it was closed down by the province of Groningen. It was known for having a miraculous statue of Mary (mother of Jesus). Only the terrain on which the monastery was built is recognisable.

Today Essen counts twenty farms in a very rural countryside; it is hard to imagine that the centre of the city of Groningen is only 5 km (3 mi) away.

The existence of Essen is being threatened by plans to build a new beltway, the Zuidtangent. The municipality of Haren has so far resisted these plans.
