= Glimmen =

- Village
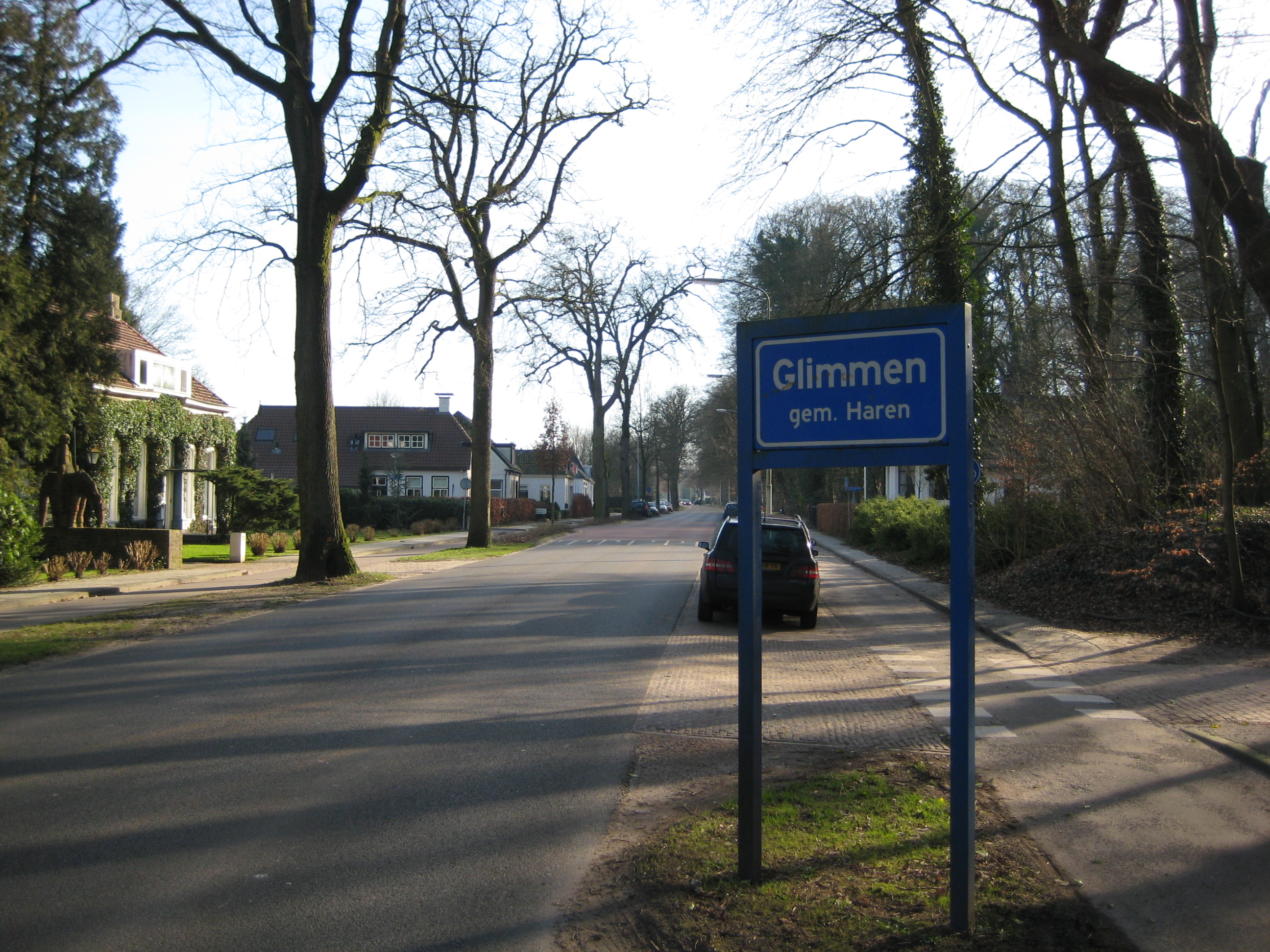

- Location of the village in the province of Groningen Glimmen (Netherlands)
- Coordinates: 53°8′18″N 6°37′43″E
- Country: Netherlands
- Province: Groningen
- Municipality: Groningen

Area
  - Total: 4.71 km^{2} (1.82 sq mi)
- Elevation: 3.2 m (10 ft)

Population (2021)
  - Total: 1,345
  - Density: 286/km^{2} (740/sq mi)
- Time zone: UTC+1 (CET)
  - Summer (DST): UTC+2 (CEST)
- Postal code: 9756
- Dialing code: 050

Glimmen is a village in the northeastern Netherlands. It is located in the municipality of Groningen, about 10 kilometres from the city. It had a population of around 1,342 in 2021. The river Drentsche Aa flows past the village, nearby the Huis te Glimmen (House in Glimmen), a stately home on the site.

The Appèlbergen is a forest to the east of the village. Through this wood leads an old Roman road, known as the Hereweg (from 'Heir-weg' or "army road").

== History ==
The village was first mentioned in the 12th century as "in Glemmene". Officially the etymology is unknown, however the current Dutch words translates as "gleaming/sparkling". Glimmen is an esdorp which developed in the Early Middle Ages on the Hondsrug between Groningen and Assen. The village never became an independent parish.

Huis te Glimmen is a manor house surrounded by a moat. Parts of the estate are from the 16th century. It probably received its current form in 1824, and a large park was added to the estate which was later named Quintusbos after the 1881 owner. The building is still a privately owned residential home.

Huize Weltevreden was built in 1828 as an inn. In 1828, it was rebuilt in neoclassic style as an estate. Since 1865, it serves as a retirement home.

Glimmen was home to 213 people in 1840. In May 1943, 34 strikers were executed and buried in Appèlbergen. They went on strike because it was announced that 300,000 former Dutch soldiers were to become prisoners of war. On 3 May 1943, 60 strikers were arrested in the northern provinces and executed. In late 1945, 19 bodies were discovered. Despite repeated search attempts, the remaining bodies have not been located yet. On 3 May 2004, a memorial was placed.

After World War II, it became a suburb of Groningen. In 1949, a Reformed Church was built, and Glimmen was awarded village status. In 1966, the remnants of two Neolithic hunebedden (dolmen) were discovered near Glimmen. Many of the stones were missing, however a large collection of artefacts, flints and pottery was discovered.

In 2018, Glimmen became part of the municipality of Groningen.

== Notable people ==
- Johan Fabricius (1899-1981), author
- Dr. A.H.J. Prins (1921-2000), professor of anthropology, specialized in East Africa and Middle East, with focus on maritime cultures.
- Daan Reiziger (born 2001), footballer

== Gallery ==
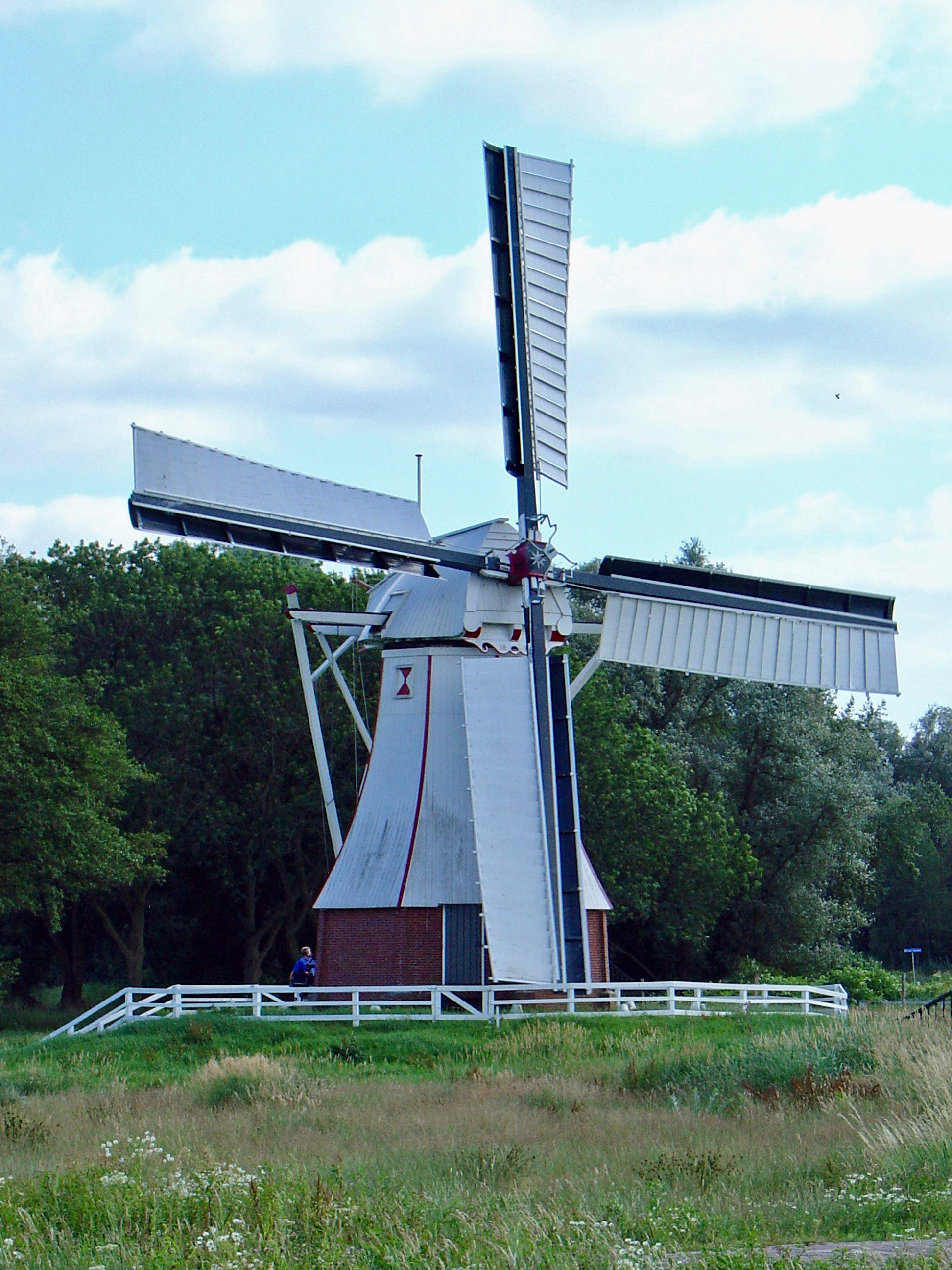
De Witte Molen in Glimmen

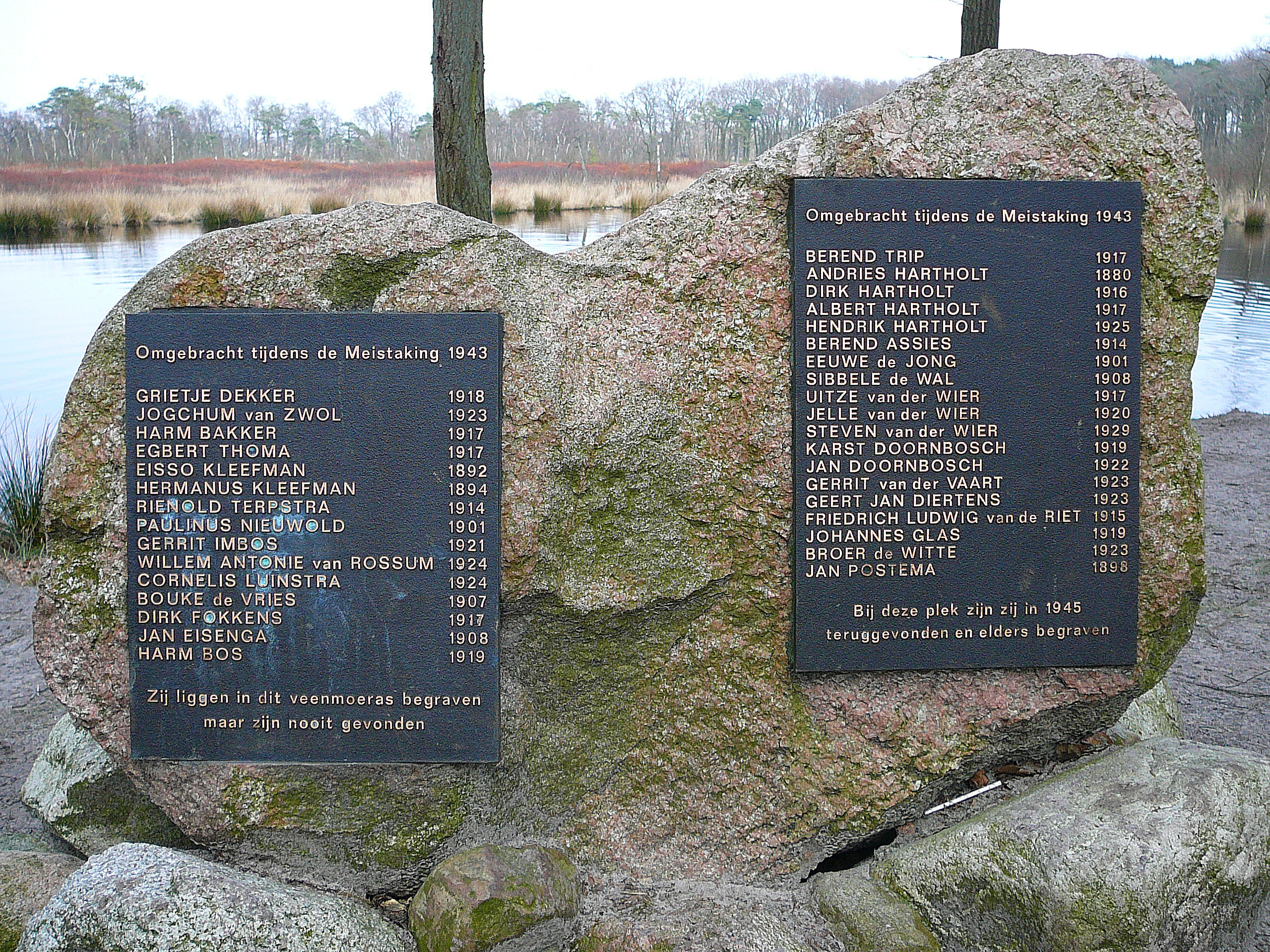
War memorial in Appèlbergen

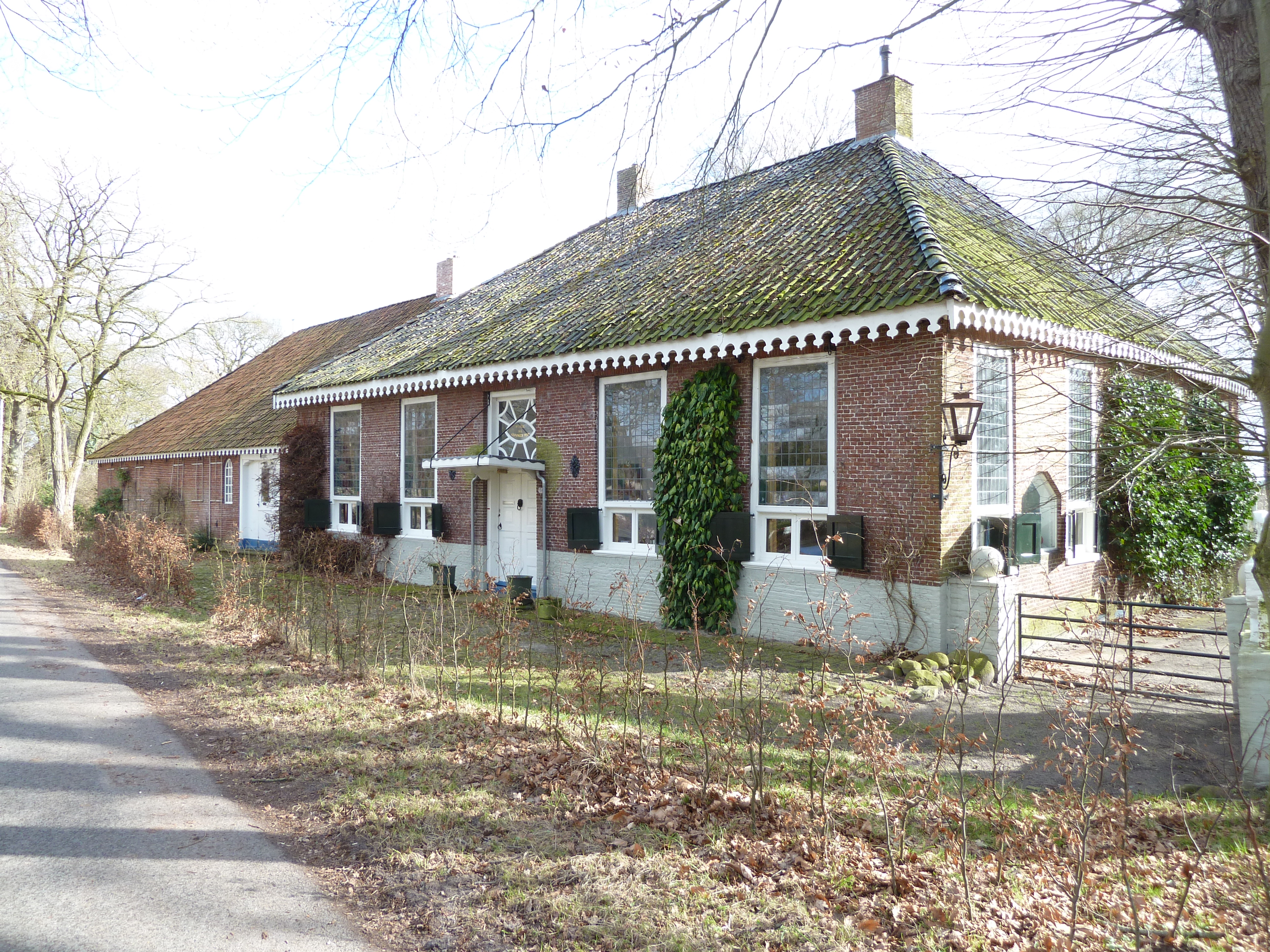
Former ferry house

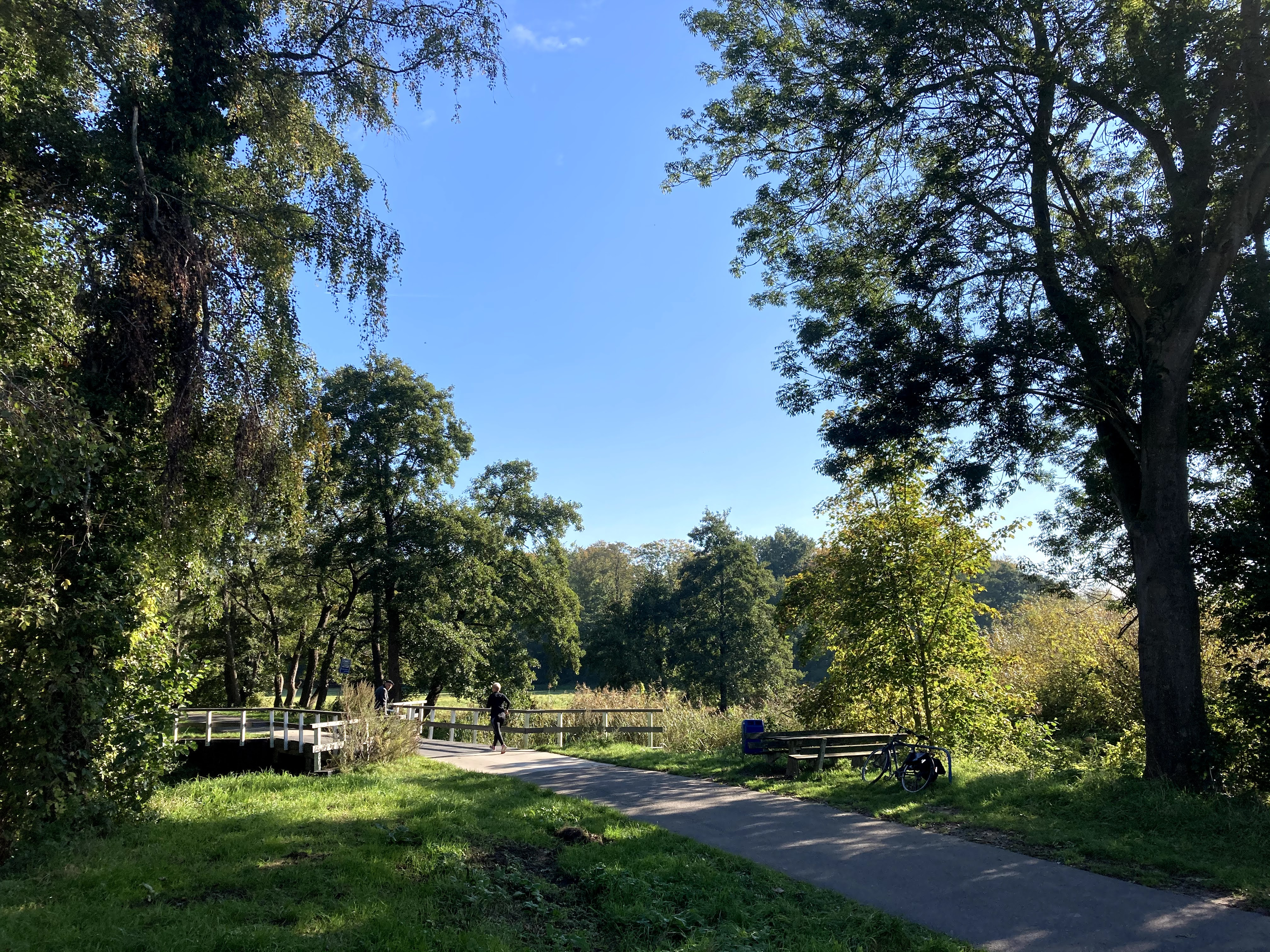
Nature area Glimmermade

== See also ==
- Noord-Nederlandse Golf & Country Club
