= De Punt =

- Village
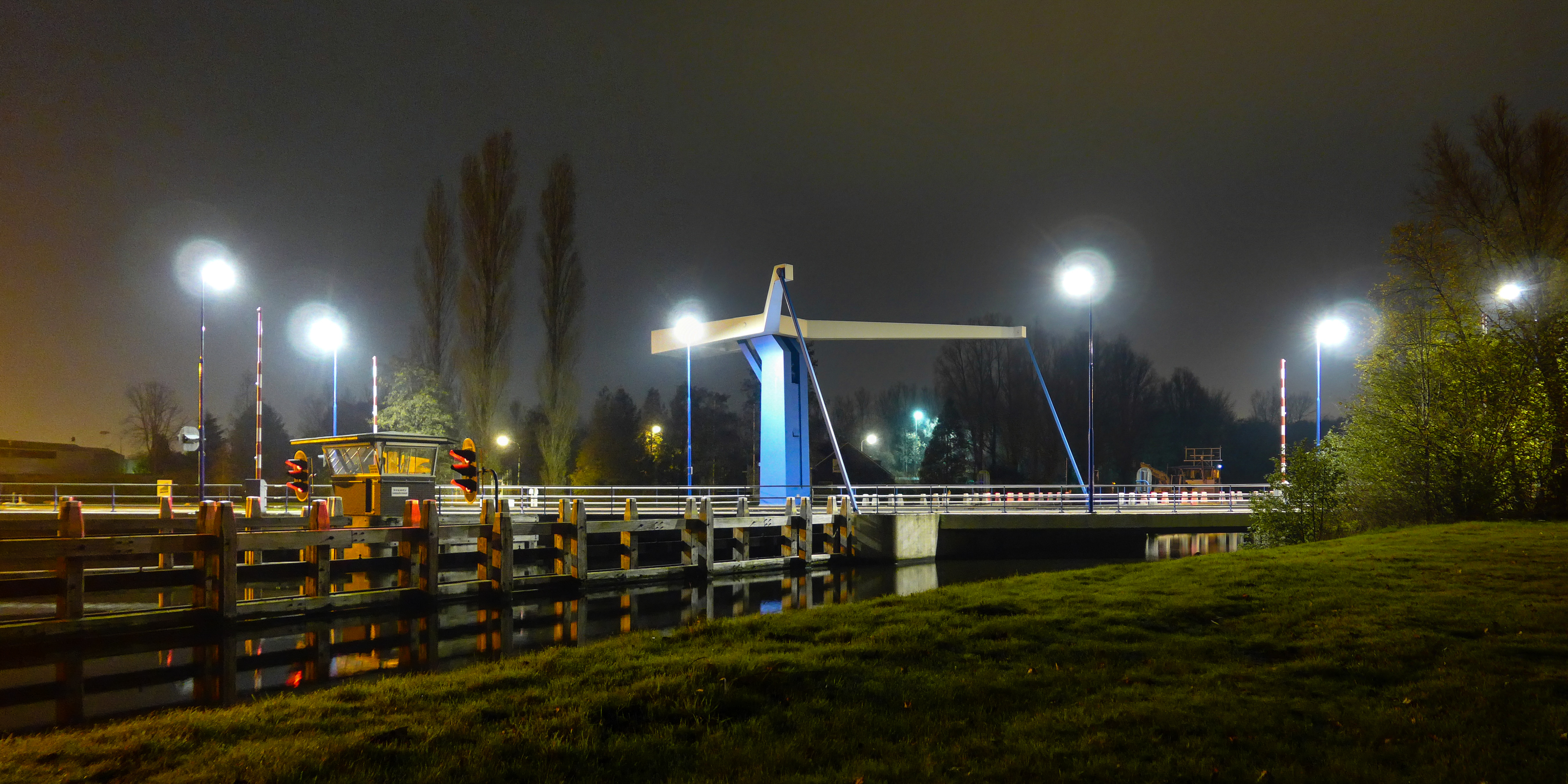
- Bridge at night

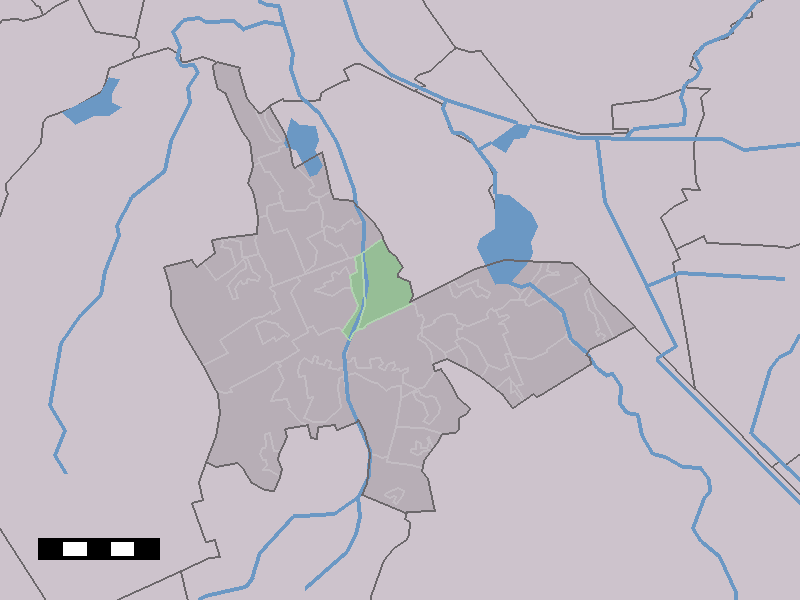
- De Punt in the municipality of Tynaarlo.

- Location in the Netherlands De Punt (Netherlands)
- Coordinates: 53°7′N 6°36′E
- Country: Netherlands
- Province: Drenthe
- Municipality: Tynaarlo

Area
  - Total: 6.48 km^{2} (2.50 sq mi)
- Elevation: 2.5 m (8.2 ft)

Population (2021)
  - Total: 235
  - Density: 36.3/km^{2} (93.9/sq mi)
- Time zone: UTC+1 (CET)
  - Summer (DST): UTC+2 (CEST)
- Postal code: 9493
- Dialing code: 050

De Punt is a village in the Dutch province of Drenthe. It is a part of the municipality of Tynaarlo, and lies about 11 km south of Groningen. The village closely cooperates with Yde and they are often referred to as Yde-De Punt, however both are still separate villages.

== History ==
The village was first mentioned in 1424 as "ter Punte", and means "ferry". It refers to a ferry over the Drentsche Aa. In the early 19th century, it consisted of an inn and one house. De Punt was home to 7 people in 1840.

In 2008, De Punt reached national headlines as the site of a fire in a shipyard, in which three firemen, aged 29 (Raymond Patrick Soyer), 38 (Egbert Ubels) and 48 (Anne Kregel), died. They are commemorated by the asteroid 12156 Ubels.

== 1977 train hostage crisis ==
De Punt was the site for the 1977 Dutch train hijacking crisis. In 1949, Indonesia became independent, and the Royal Netherlands East Indies Army was disbanded. The islands of Ambon, Buru, and Seram had fought on side of the Netherlands. They were opposed to a Java-dominated Indonesia, and proclaimed the Republic of South Maluku which resulted in an attack by Indonesia. In 1951, 12,000 refugees from South Maluku were temporarily resettled in the Netherlands. They started to feel betrayed, because it developed into permanent exile.

On 23 May 1977, the train from Assen to Groningen was hijacked by 9 armed South Moluccans. On 25 May, the hijackers threatened to blow up the train, if the Dutch government refused to plead for an independent South Maluku. On 11 June 1977, the Netherlands Marine Corps aided by the Air Force, attacked the train. There were eight deaths: six Moluccans and two civilians. The incident remains controversial due to excessive violence from the marines: a total of 144 bullets were fired. A claim for damages was denied by Minister Ivo Opstelten in 2015. In 2018, three witnesses came forward and claimed that the marines had been ordered to shoot to kill.

== Gallery ==
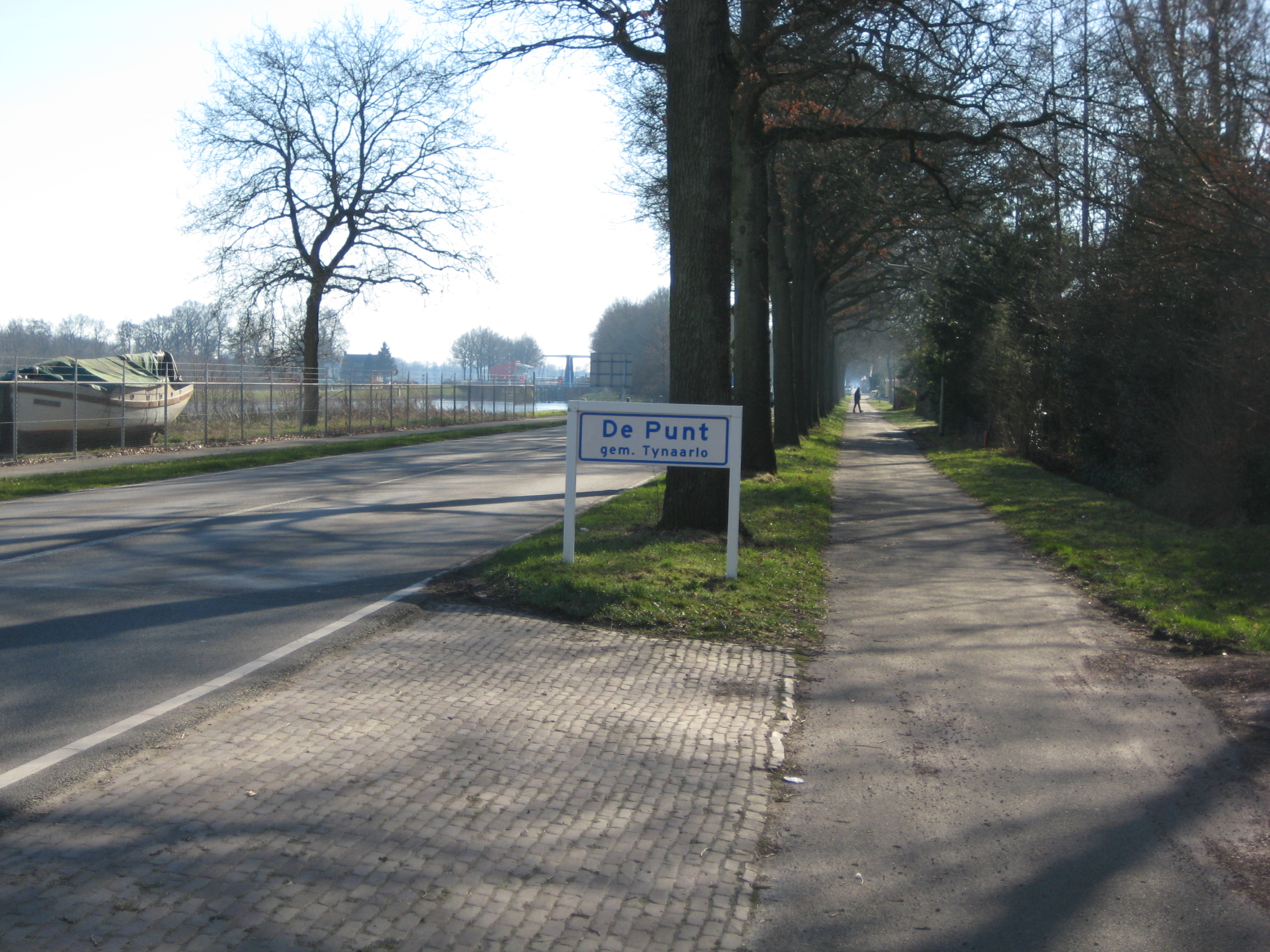
Place name sign

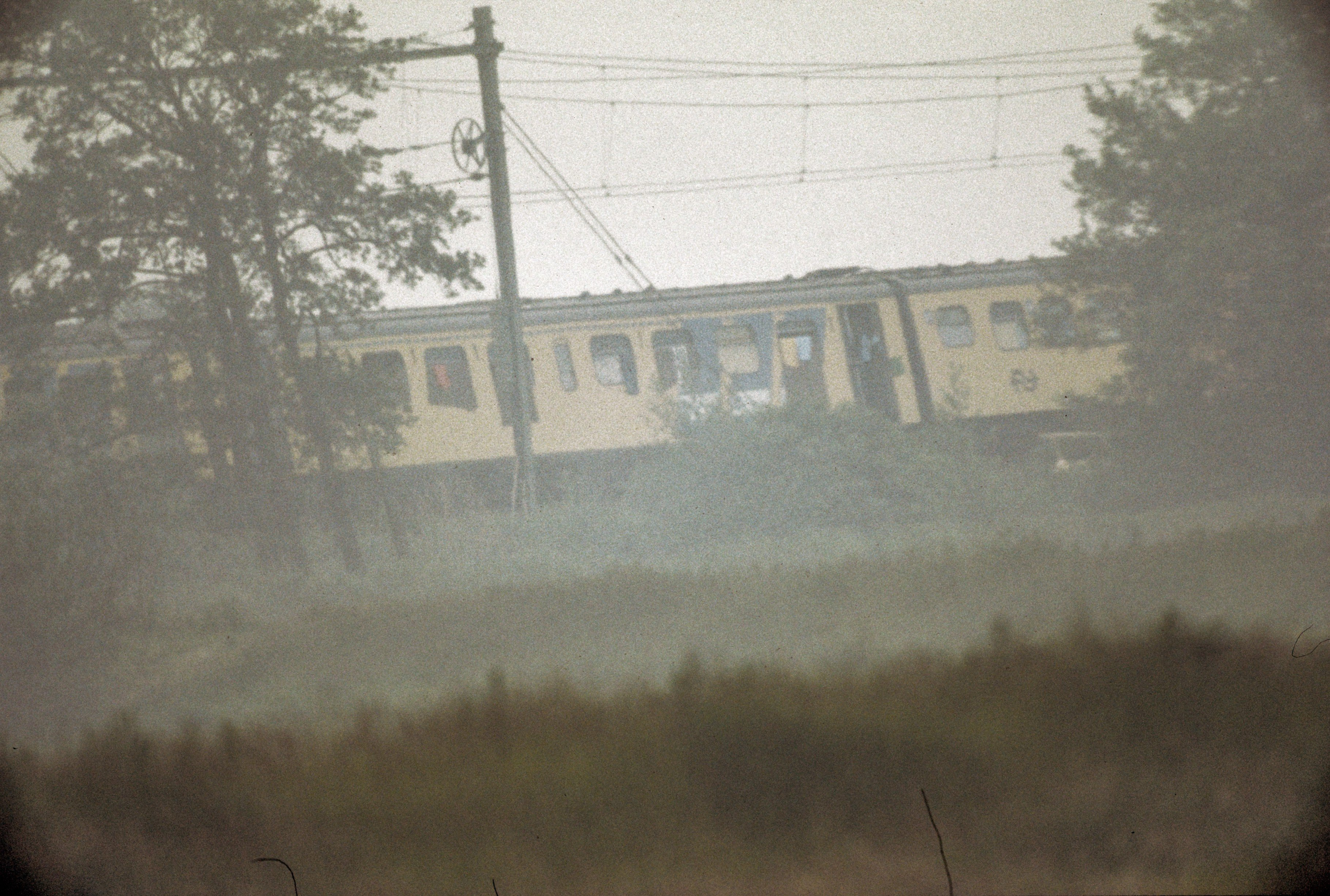
1977 train hostage
