= Onnen =

- Village
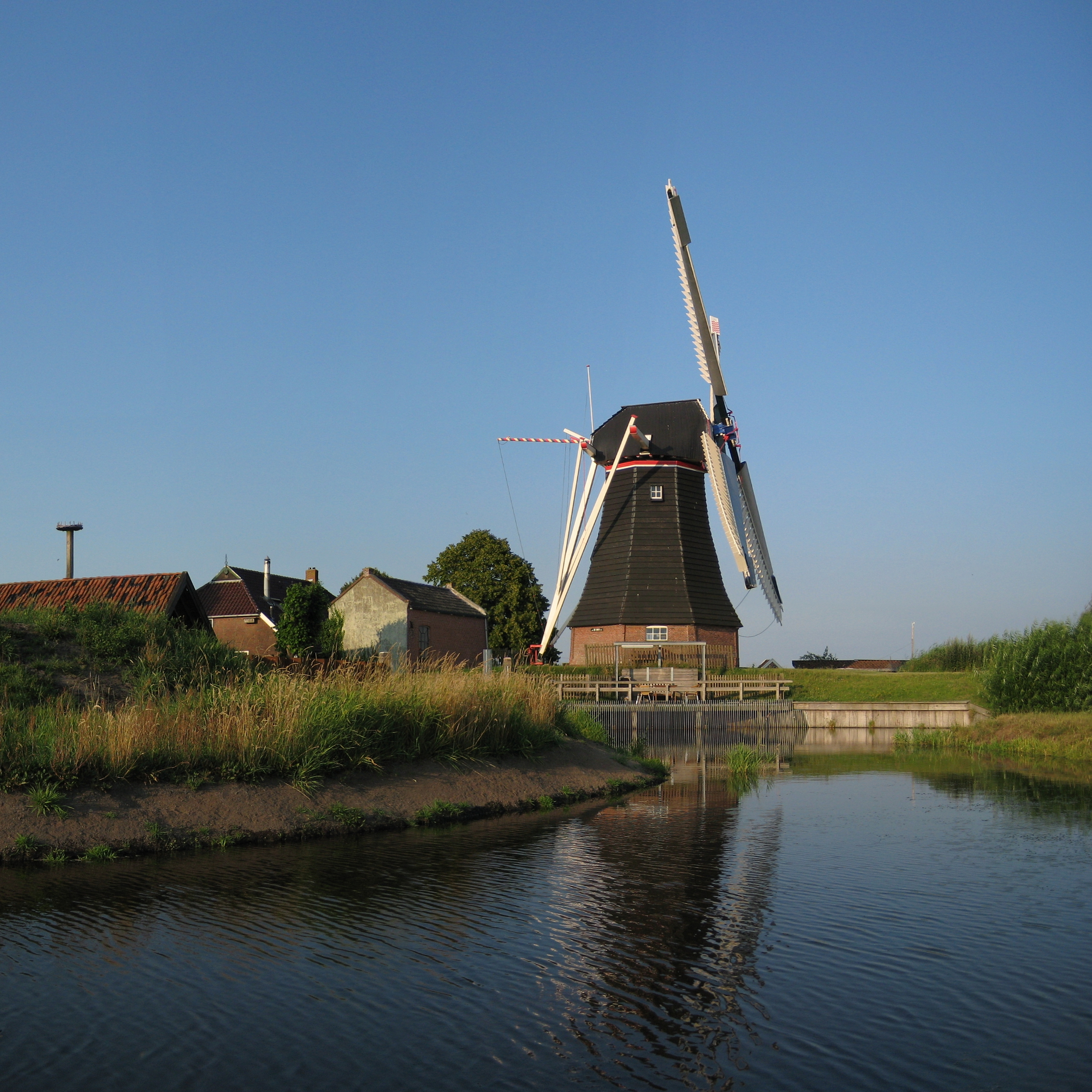
- Windmill De Biks

- Location of Onnen in the province of Groningen Onnen (Netherlands)
- Coordinates: 53.1568°N 6.6416°E
- Country: Netherlands
- Province: Groningen
- Municipality: Groningen

Area
  - Total: 13.01 km^{2} (5.02 sq mi)
- Elevation: 3.1 m (10 ft)

Population (2021)
  - Total: 705
  - Density: 54.2/km^{2} (140/sq mi)
- Time zone: UTC+1 (CET)
  - Summer (DST): UTC+2 (CEST)
- Postal code: 9755
- Dialing code: 050

Onnen is a village in the municipality of Groningen in the Netherlands. There are some picturesque farms and windmills in the village.

Onnen is an esdorp. The Onner ash lies a considerable distance from the actual village (an ash generally lies flat outside a village).

The Groningen – Assen railway lies near Onnen. NedTrain's classification yard is also situated close to Onnen.

== History ==
The village was first mentioned in 1323 as Hunne. The etymology is unclear. Onnen developed as an esdorp. During the Middle Ages, the peat in the area was excavated.

Onnen was home to 264 people in 1840.

== Gallery ==
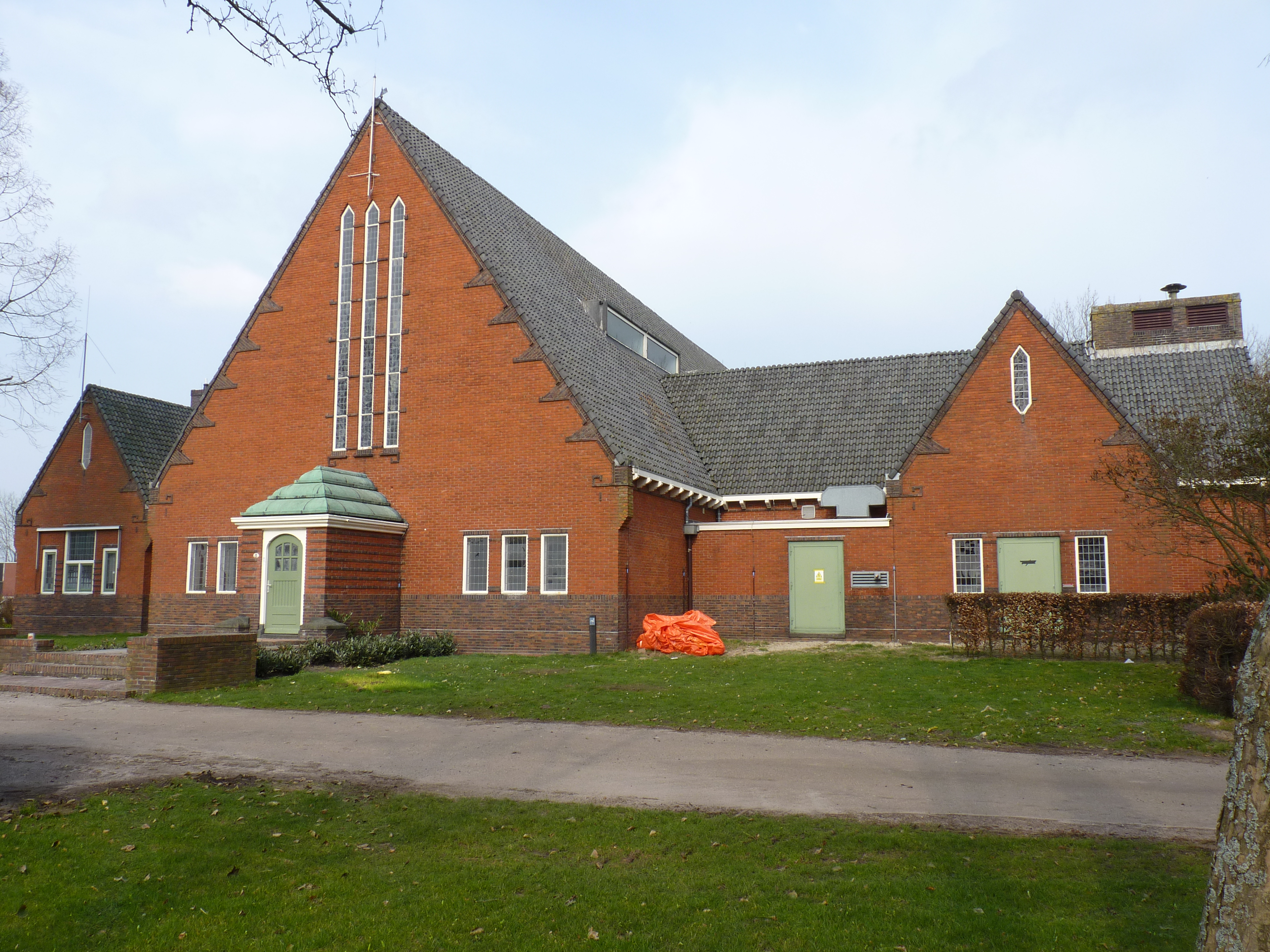
Drinking water pumping station

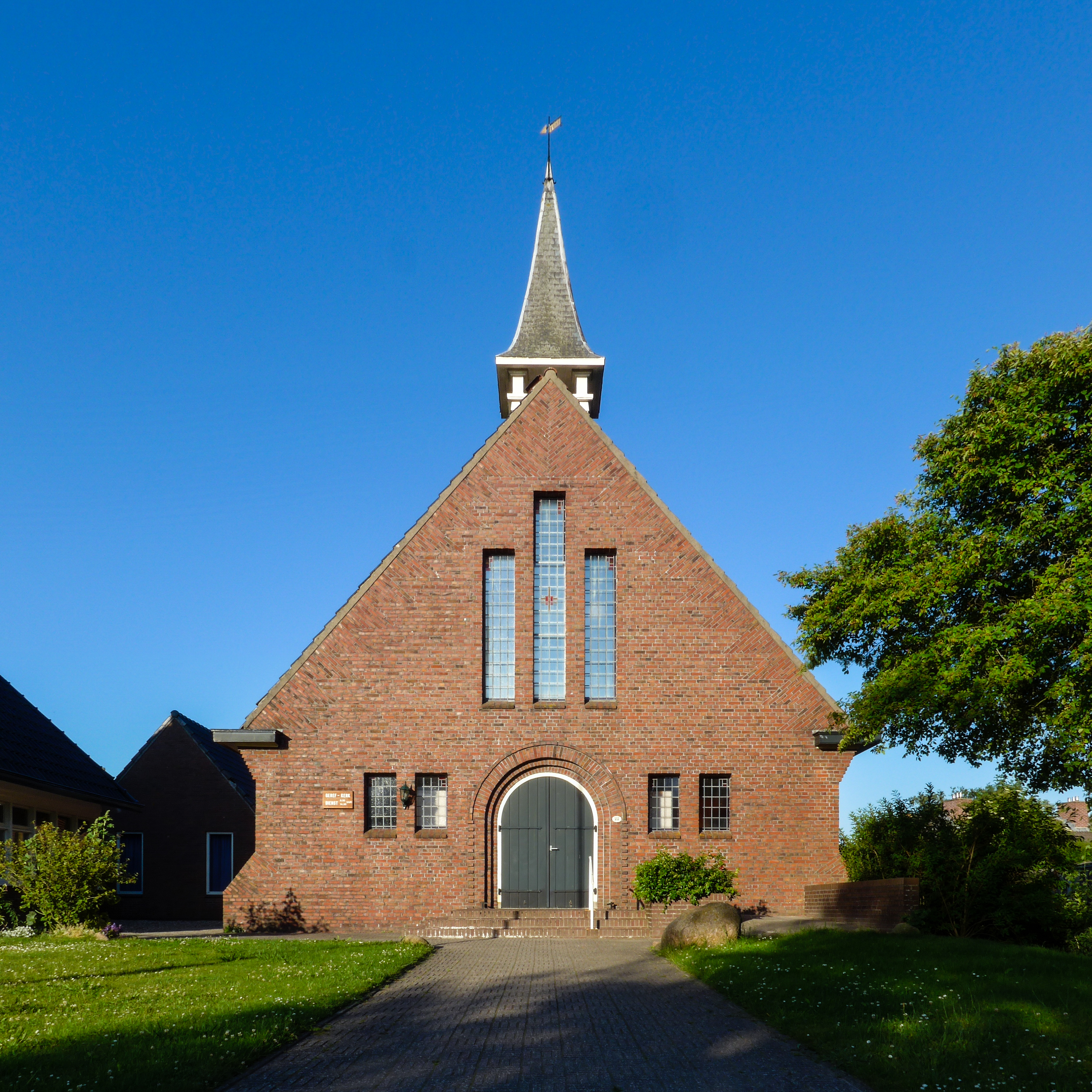
Liberated Reformed Church

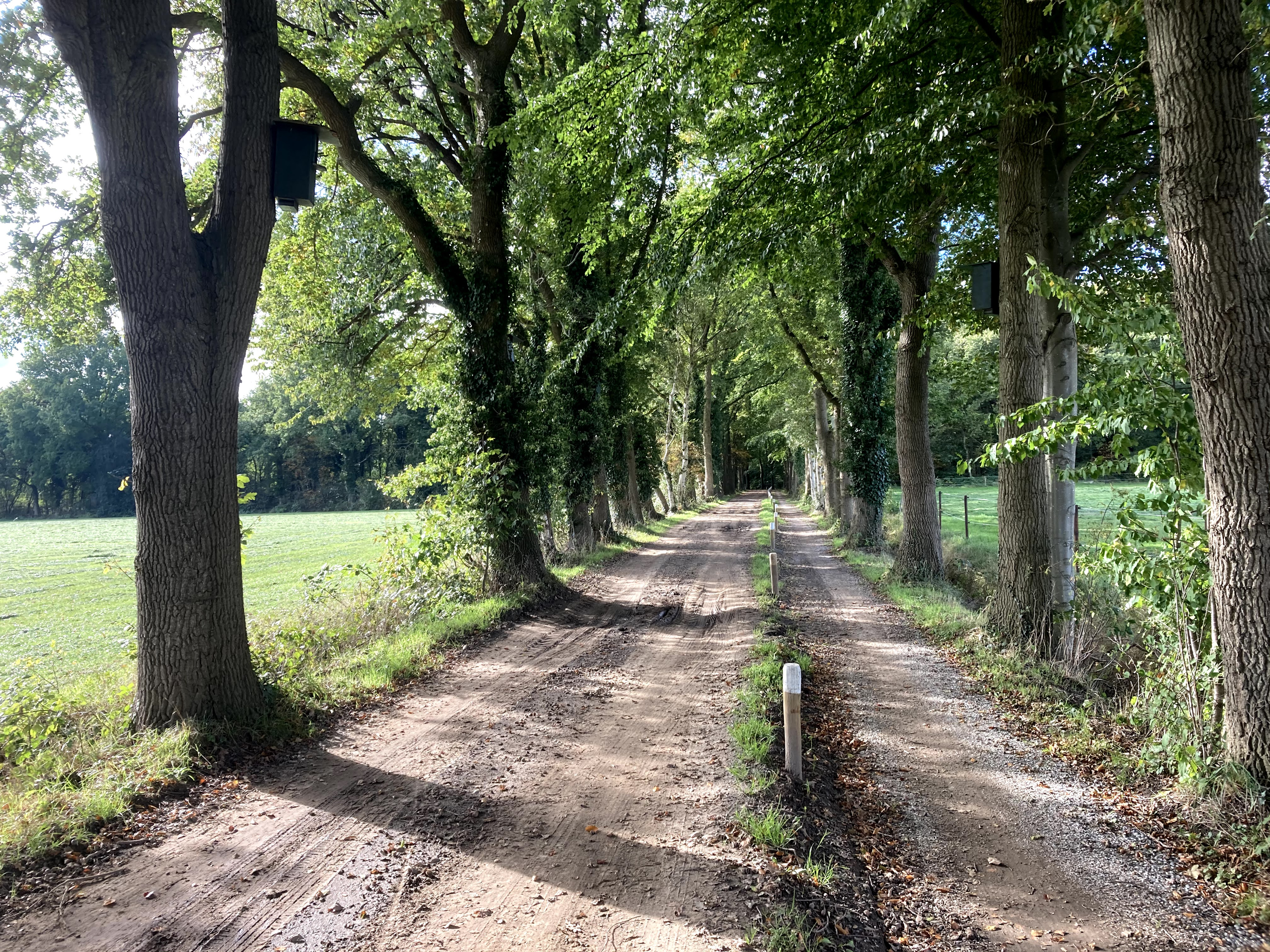
Forest road

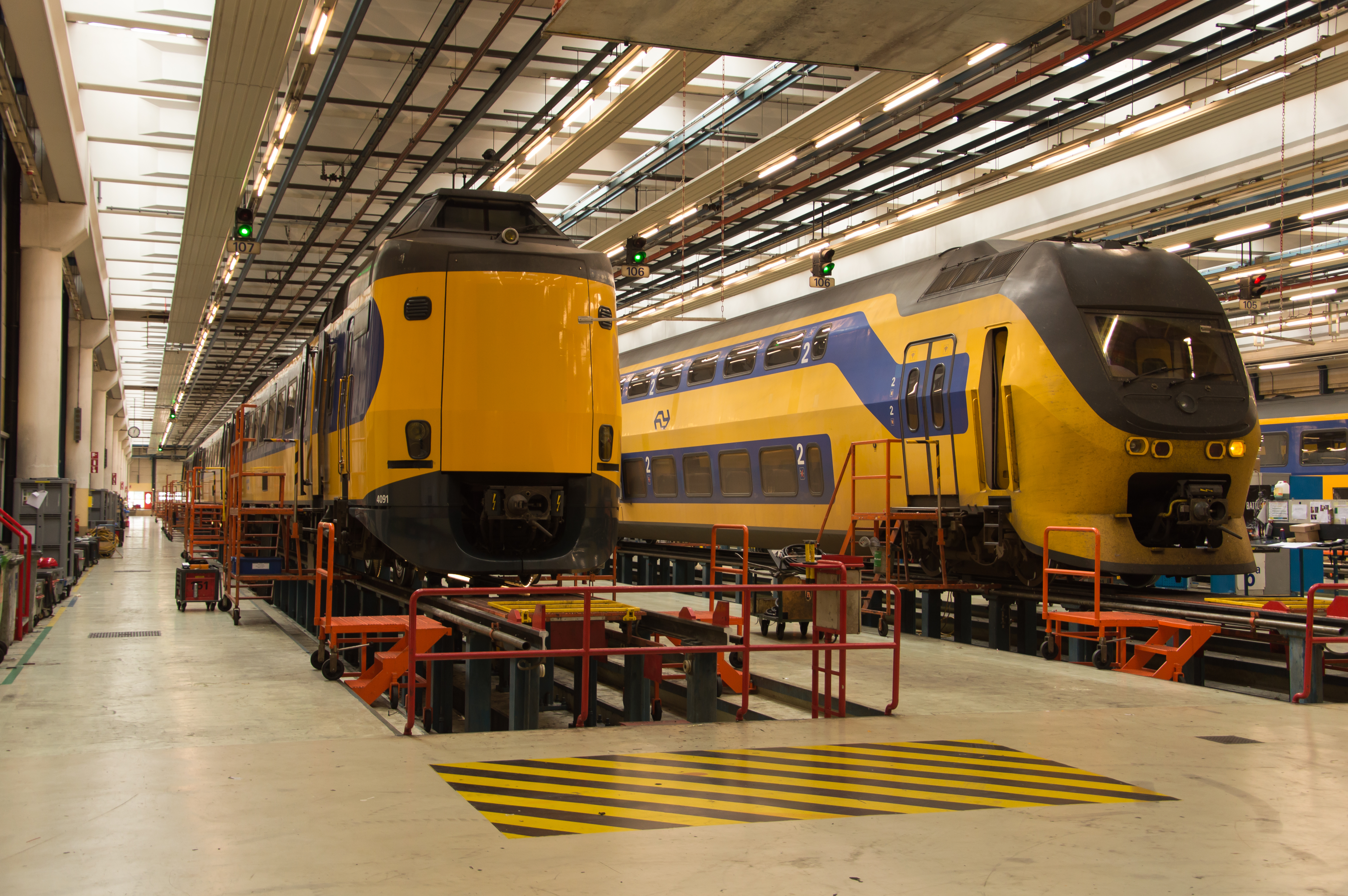
Maintenance on trains
