= Appèlbergen =

Coordinates: 53°08′13″N 6°36′36″E

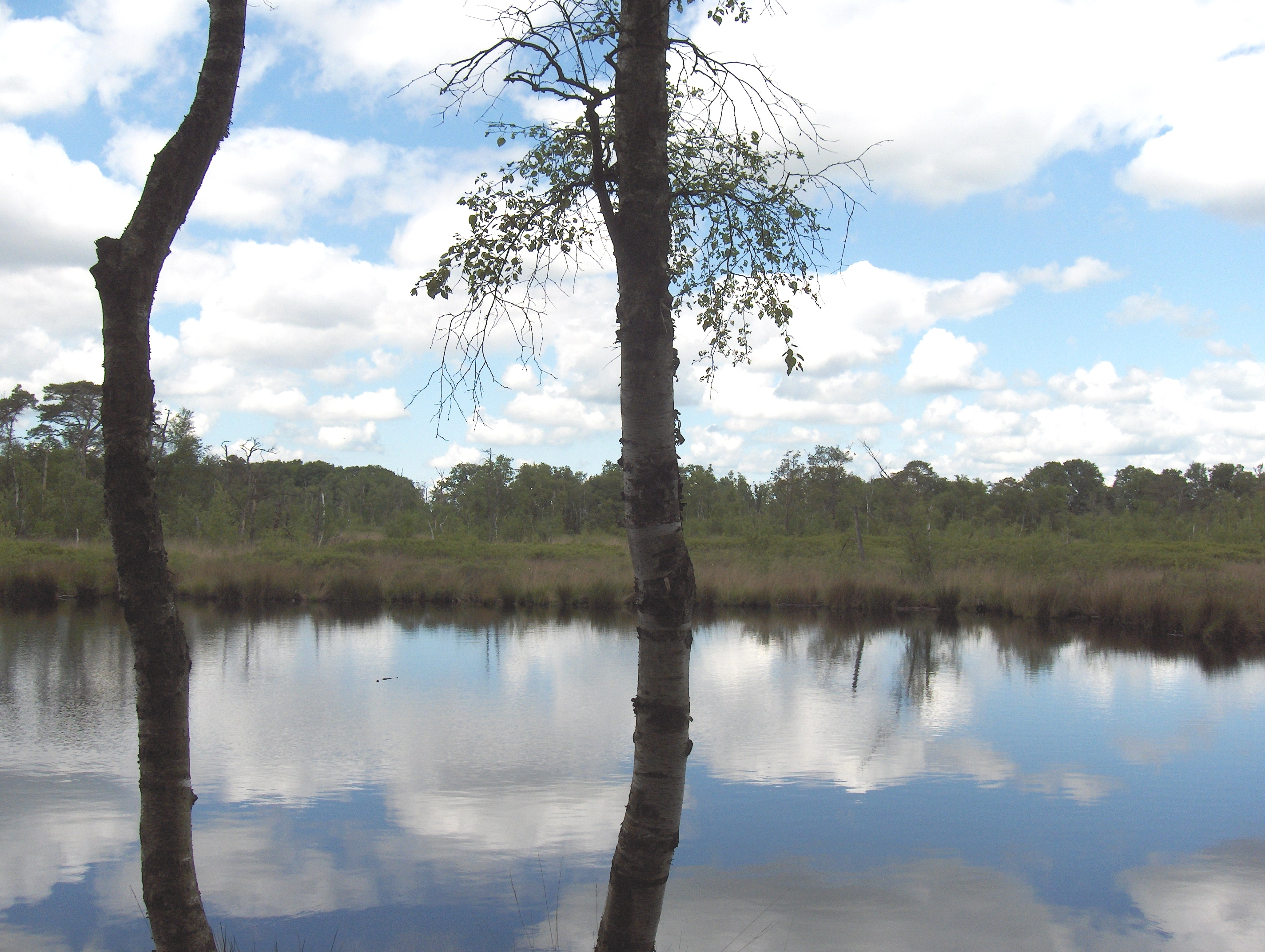
The small lake of Appelbergen

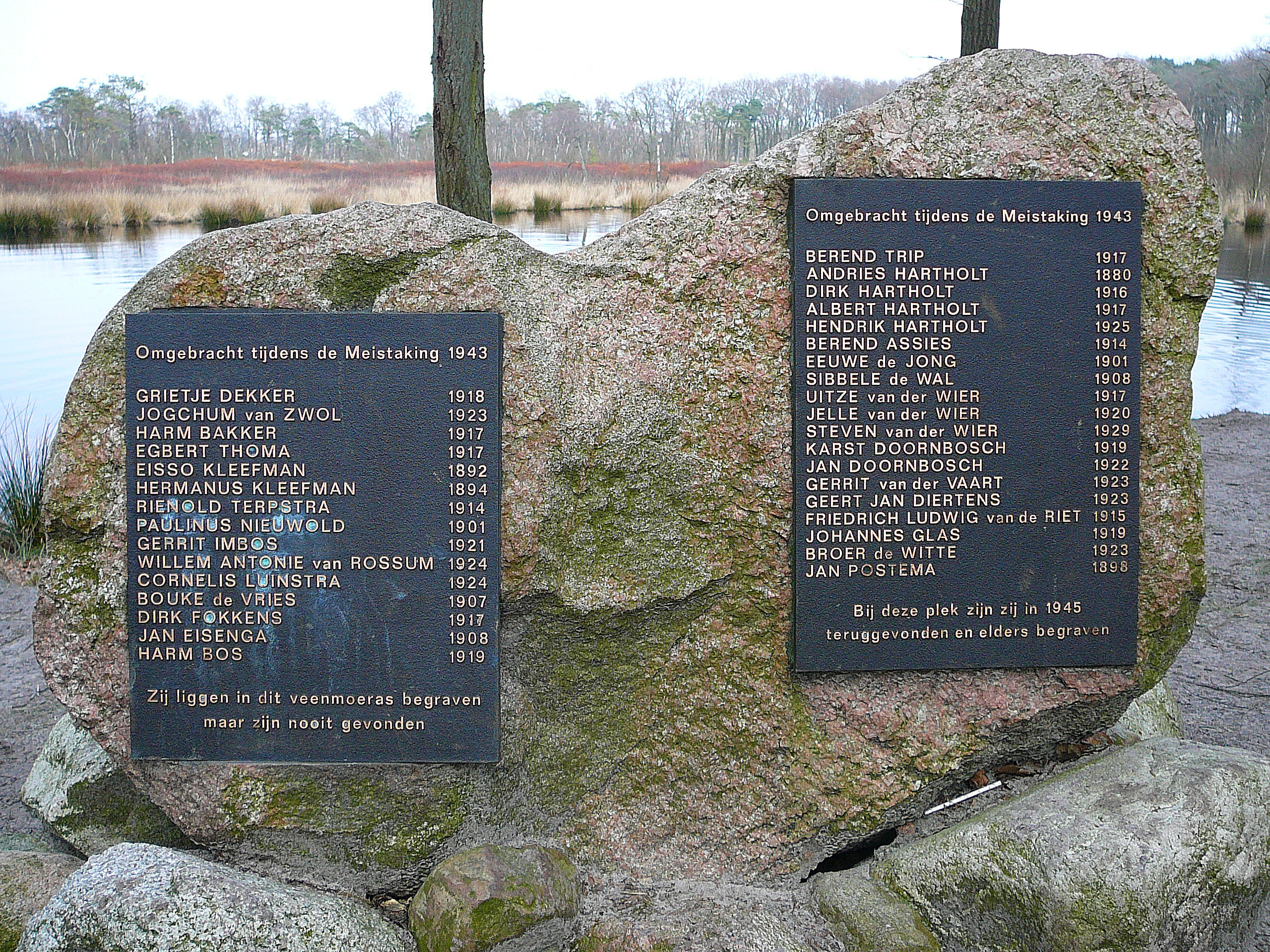
World War II memorial next to the lake

The Appèlbergen is a forest to the east of the village of Glimmen. It's located in the province of Groningen.

In the Second World War, the Germans buried 34 people secretly after they had killed them. Of the 34 people, 15 have never been recovered. Between 1949 and 2004, there were several attempts to find the buried people. In 2004, there has been placed a monument for the victims.
