= Drentsche Aa =

River in the Netherlands

Coordinates: 53°09′N 6°36′E

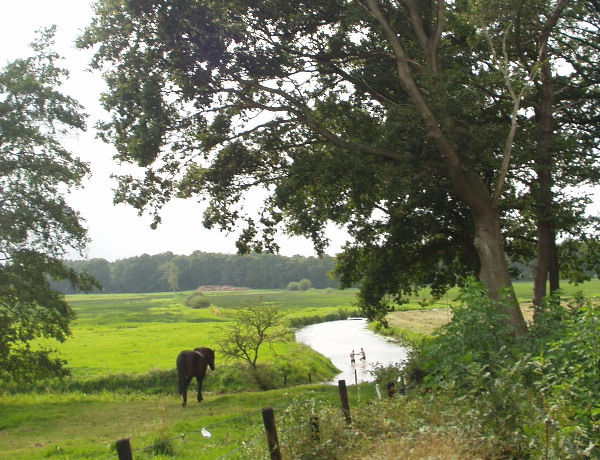
The Drentsche Aa

The Drentsche Aa (Dutch pronunciation: [ˌdrɛntsə ˈʔaː]) is a river rising in the Dutch province of Drenthe, flowing through Drenthe and for the last part the province of Groningen. It ends in the Schipsloot near Haren, which flows into the Noord-Willemskanaal; however, originally it ended into the Selwerderdiep. The water finally ends in the Lauwersmeer and Waddenzee.

In Groningen and the northernmost part of Drenthe, the water is known as Drentsche Aa (sometimes Aa in Groningen), but in Drenthe it has a multitude of local names, such as Deurzerdiep, Looner Diep, Taarlosche Diep, Oudemolensche Diep, Schipborgsche Diep, and Westerdiep. A large part of the catchment of the Drentsche Aa is located in the Drentsche Aa National Landscape.
