= WTC Expo =

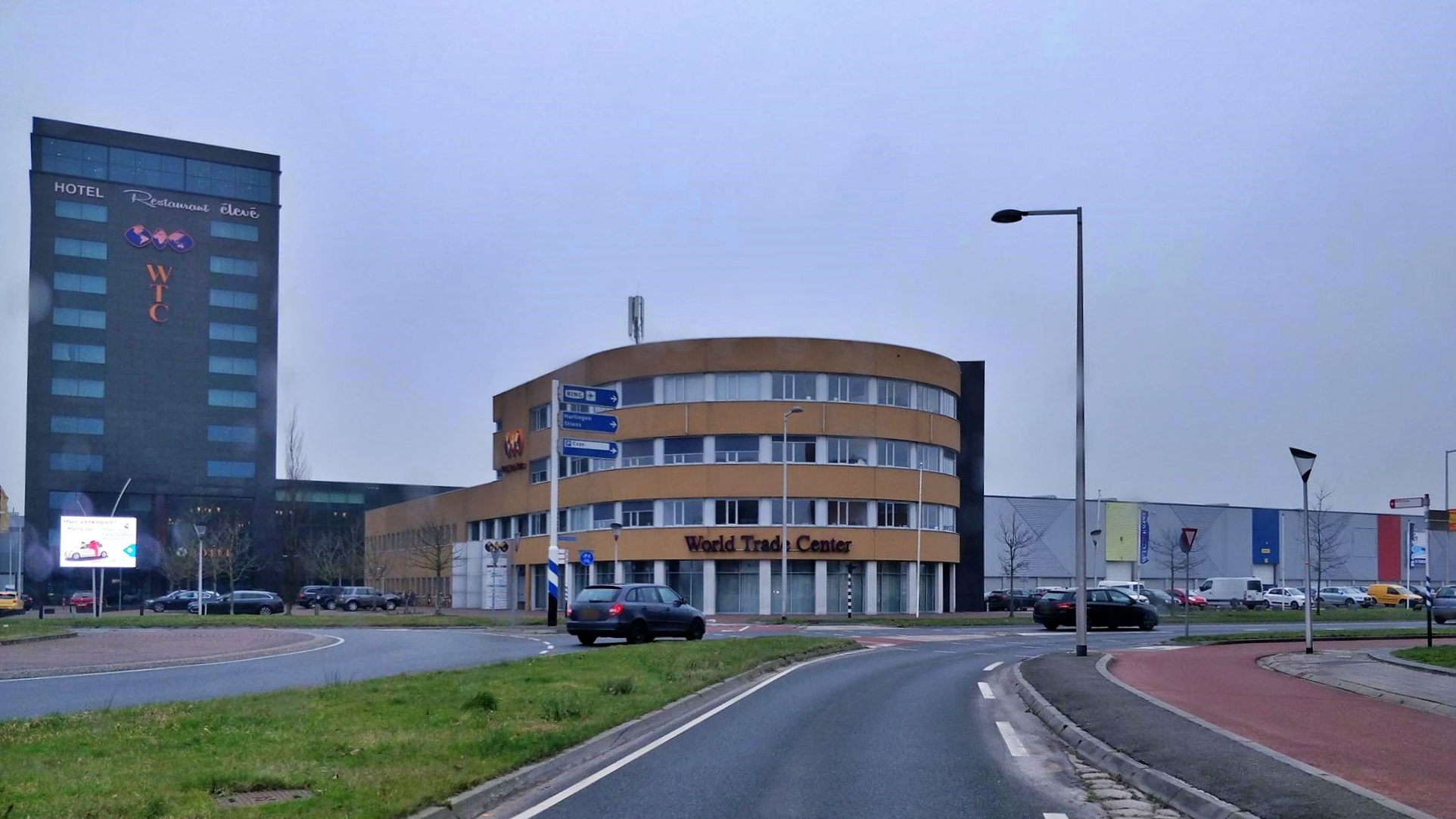
- Interactive map of WTC Expo
- Location: Leeuwarden, Netherlands
- Coordinates: 53.2006°N 5.7727°E
- Owner: WTC Beheer B.V.

Construction
- Built: 1961
- Opened: 1963

Website
- wtcexpo.nl

WTC Expo is a complex of conference and exhibition halls belonging to the World Trade Center in Leeuwarden, Netherlands. It is the largest convention center of the province of Friesland.

Opened in 1963, it initially served as a market hall for the city's cattle market. Nowadays, it mainly hosts (international) expositions, conferences and other big events. Until 2005, the complex was known as FEC Expo, short for Frisian Expo Center.

== See also ==
- RAI Amsterdam Convention Centre
- Jaarbeurs
- Brabanthallen
- List of convention centres in the Netherlands
