= Horticultural Trades Association =

The Horticultural Trades Association (HTA) is a trade association based in the United Kingdom, representing garden centres, plant nurseries, garden manufacturers, and landscape gardeners (also known as ornamental horticulture).

== History ==
The HTA was founded in 1899, following its first meeting at the Garden Hall in the Crystal Palace when 21 men were elected to the committee. It was incorporated as a company on 12 August 1920. Annually since 1930, the HTA has presented the Pearson Memorial Award for outstanding service to the garden sector, the award is named in memory of the HTA's first General Secretary, Charles Pearson.

== Structure ==
It is headquartered at Horticulture House in Chilton, Oxfordshire, a half-mile east of the Harwell Science and Innovation Campus.

The Garden Centre Association was formerly run at the HTA offices, but is now in Cheshire. The Association of Professional Landscapers (APL) is a division of the HTA formed in 1995, and is headquartered at Horticulture House.

The HTA is part of the International Association of Horticultural Producers (AIPH / IAHP), who is also based at Horticulture House.

== Function ==
The HTA is a non-profit member-based organisation of around 1,400 members, supporting UK environmental horticulture through lobbying, workplace training and market research.

In 1962, the National Garden Gift Voucher scheme was launched, this was later rebranded in 2024 to the National Garden Gift Card programme, in a move away from paper-based vouchers.

The HTA runs the Ornamental Horticulture Assurance Scheme (OHAS), formerly known as the British Ornamental Plant Producers (BOPP). OHAS operates as a specialist group of the HTA, aiming to improve British ornamental horticulture by providing certifications to growers, packhouses and growing media manufacturers.

== Lobbying ==
The HTA actively engages with UK governments through advocacy and campaign with the aim of bringing changes and improvement to support the UK horticulture industry. In February 2026, they launched the Welsh Environmental Horticulture Manifesto which calls for a cross-government approach and encourages the government to recognise that the support of horticulture and green spaces achieves results in line with the Well-being of Future Generations (Wales) Act. The HTA is also involved in campaigning for better import and export trade in UK horticulture, they called for a new Sanitary and Phytosanitary (SPS) arrangement with the EU in January 2026, publishing a survey of British MPs .

== See also ==
- Commercial Horticultural Association, in Kent
- Flowers and Plants Association (FPA)
