= Tanke (surname) =

Tanke is a surname. Notable people include:

- Annemarie Tanke (born 1978), Dutch cricketer
- Darren Tanke (born 1960), Canadian fossil preparation technician
- Joseph Tanke (born 1978), American philosopher
- Michael Tanke (born 1989), American soccer player and coach
- Willem Tanke (born 1959), Dutch organist
