= Lodewijk van Heiden =

Dutch-born Russian admiral (1773–1850)

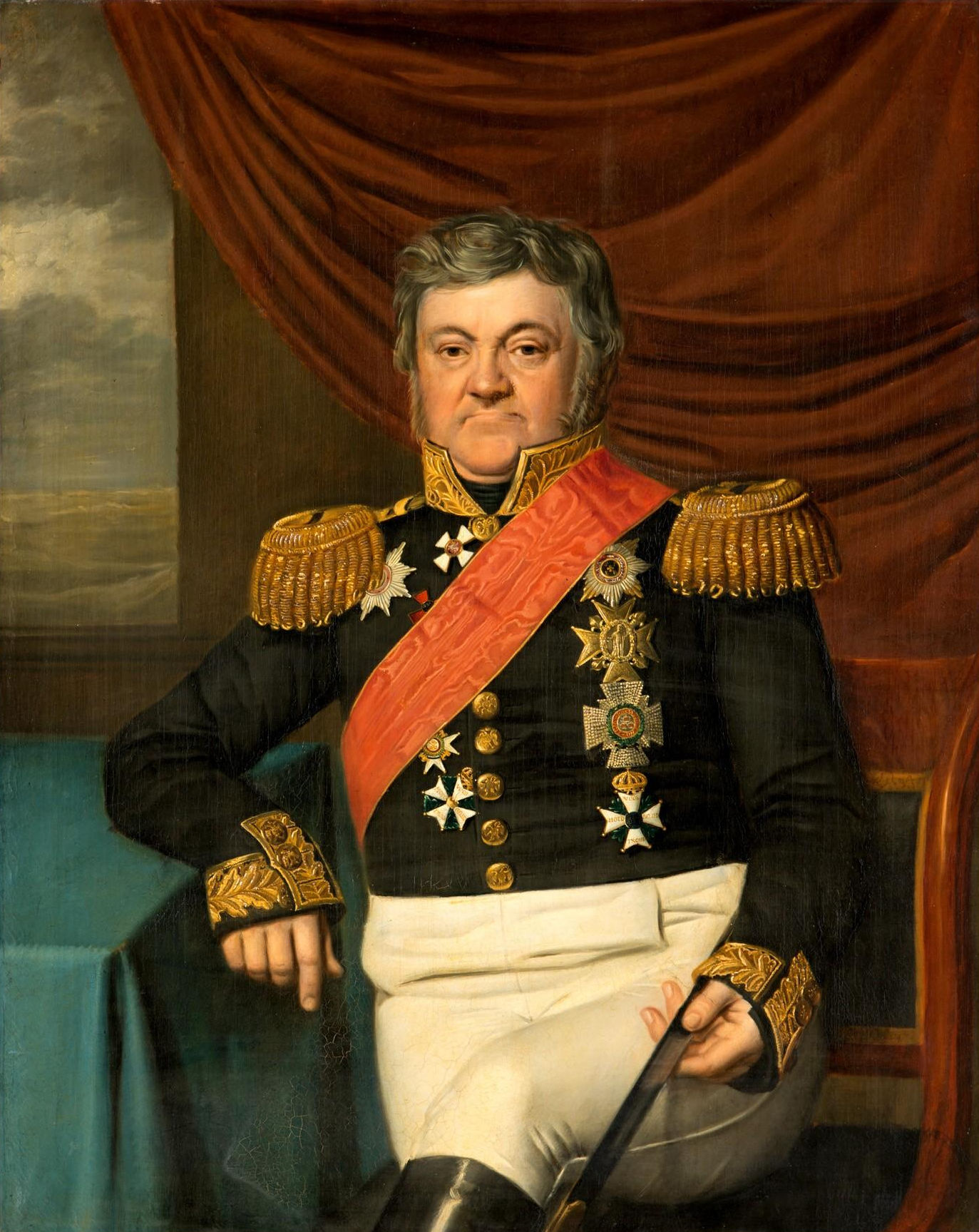
- Portrait by Johan Joeke Gabriel van Wicheren, c. 1820
- Born: September 6, 1773; Zuidlaren, Netherlands
- Died: September 17, 1850 (aged 77); Reval, Russia
- Other name: Loggin Petrovich van Heiden
- Military career
- Allegiance: Netherlands; Russia
- Branch: Dutch States Navy; Imperial Russian Navy
- Rank: Admiral
- Conflicts: Battle of Sandöström; Battle of Navarino

Lodewijk Sigismund Vincent Gustaaf Reichsgraf van Heiden (German: Ludwig Sigismund Vinzent Gustav Reichsgraf van Heyden; Russian: Логгин (Логин) Петрович Гейден, romanized: Loggin (Login) Petrovich Geyden; 6 September 1773 – 17 October 1850) was a Dutch naval officer and Orangist who went into exile from the Batavian Republic and served in the Russian Navy. He ultimately became a Russian admiral and commanded a squadron of the Imperial Russian Navy in the Battle of Navarino (1827).

He was the father of Fyodor Logginovich van Heiden.

== Personal life ==
Born in Zuidlaren, in the northeast of the Netherlands, Van Heiden was the second son of Sigismund Pieter Alexander Reichsgraf van Heiden, Lord of Reinestein and Laarwoud, Drost of Drenthe, and Marie Frederique Freiin van Reede. He is the only Dutch naval hero to have come from the landlocked province of Drenthe.

Van Heiden married Anne-Marie Akeleye, daughter of Captain Johannes Akeleye, a Danish-born sea officer in Russian service. They had four children, including their sons Friedrich Moritz and Ludwig Heinrich Sigismund van Heiden, the future Governor-General of the Grand Duchy of Finland.

== Early naval career ==
Van Heiden joined the Dutch States Navy in 1782, and was promoted to lieutenant at sea in 1789. Over the next six years, he made several voyages to the Dutch colonial empire. An Orangist, van Heiden accompanied William V, Prince of Orange as he fled to England in early 1795. Upon van Heiden's return to Holland, he was arrested by Batavian authorities and imprisoned in the Gevangenpoort in The Hague. Despite being interrogated several times, van Heiden refused to give any details on William's escape. After two months, he was released on the initiative of French general Jean-Charles Pichegru. Van Heiden subsequently tendered his commission and returned to Zuidlaren. He proceeded to offer his services to the Russian Empire, and was appointed as a senior lieutenant in the Imperial Russian Navy. Van Heiden served in the Black Sea Fleet until 1803, having been promoted to captain 2nd rank. Having married, he purchased an estate in Estonia.

In 1808, van Heiden was promoted to captain 1st rank and appointed as commander of the Russian flotilla in Vyborg, serving in the Finnish War against Sweden. On 2 August 1809, he defeated the Swedish Navy's archipelago fleet at the Battle of Sandöström. The archipelago fleet retreated to Åland, though the Swedish and British navies continued to control the Baltic Sea. Van Heiden was subsequently appointed as squadron commander in the Grand Duchy of Finland. In 1814, he was promoted to Commodore in reward for his service at the siege of Danzig. Van Heiden was decorated several times during this period, partly in order to keep him in the Russian navy.

== Commander in the Mediterranean ==
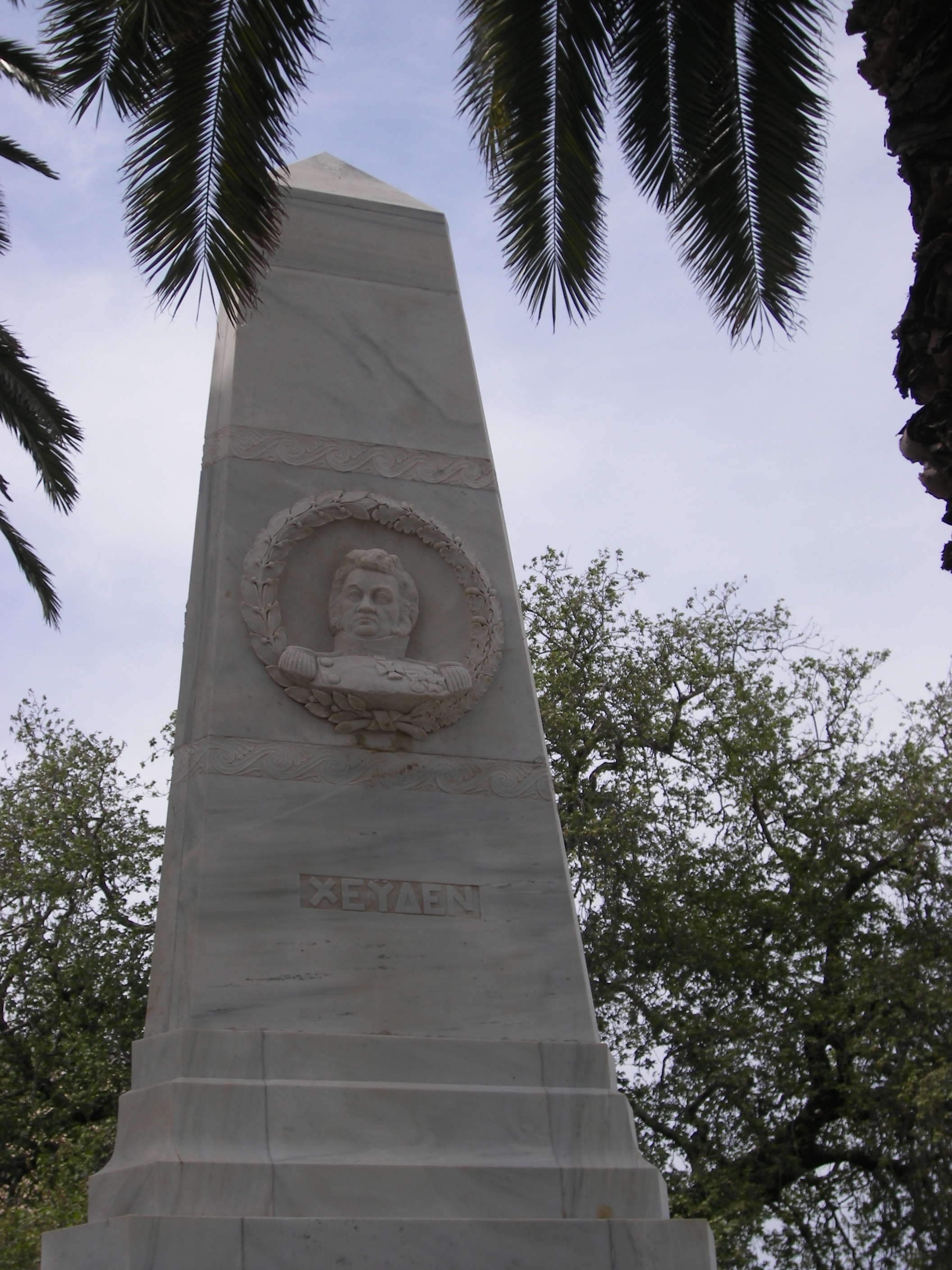
Heyden monument in Pylos in commemoration of the Battle of Navarino

In 1826, Van Heiden was given command of the Russian fleet in the Mediterranean (with Mikhail Lazarev as deputy). On 27 October 1827, he was the commander of the Russian squadron in the Battle of Navarino against the Turks during the Greek War of Independence – one of the most important sea battles of that war. It ended with the defeat of the Turko-Egyptian fleet. Van Heiden narrowly escaped death when the quarterdeck where he was standing was shattered by a cannonball. The victory meant promotion to Vice-Admiral and several more decorations. His international prestige grew: the Greeks considered him their redeemer from the Turks. In Athens one of the roads to Victoria Square is named after van Heiden. There is also a statue, and in 1927 his portrait was on a Greek stamp.

== Governor of Kronstadt ==
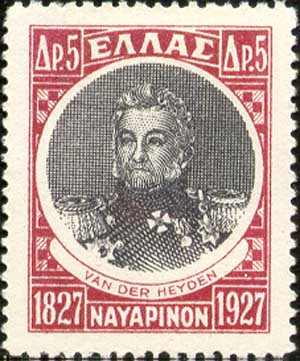
Greek stamp issued in 1927 on the 100th anniversary of the Battle of Navarino. Van Heiden's malleable name is here given as "Van der Heyden".

At the height of his fame, respected everywhere and by everyone, decorated with numerous European medals, he was summoned by the Tsar to become military governor of Kronstadt (on Kotlin Island in the Gulf of Finland between Estonia and Saint Petersburg) and Reval (Tallinn, now capital of Estonia, then capital of the Governorate of Estonia). The population loved him and, as the Greeks did, called him baba (Father).

== Return to the Netherlands ==
In 1832, Van Heiden returned to the Netherlands for the last time. He was welcomed by the monarch, King William I, who lent him an armoured steamship to visit several important cities, as well as his home town, Zuidlaren. Guards of honour accompanied him to the town hall and a large banquet was held at Laarwoud. He stayed at the estate for some time, but couldn't reacclimatise and shrank into himself. He only appeared in public to sail the Zuidlaardermeer lake. He left for the New World, but was disappointed and eventually returned to Estonia. Back in Tallinn he fell ill from oedema and died there in 1850 at the age of 77. Contrary to his wish to be buried in Zuidlaren, Van Heiden was buried at the now-destroyed Kopli cemetery in Tallinn.

== Honours and awards ==
- Order of St. Alexander Nevsky with diamonds
- Order of St. George, III degree (9 November 1827), IV degree (6 June 1821)
- Order of Saint Vladimir. 1st class
- Order of the White Eagle
- Honorary Knight Commander of the Order of the Bath
- Commander of the Military Order of William (26 August 1832)
- Order of St. Anna 1st class
- Knight Grand Cross of the Royal Order of Francis I
- Grand Cross of the Order of the Redeemer (Greece)
- Commander Grand Cross of the Order of the Sword (Sweden)
- Gold Sword for Bravery

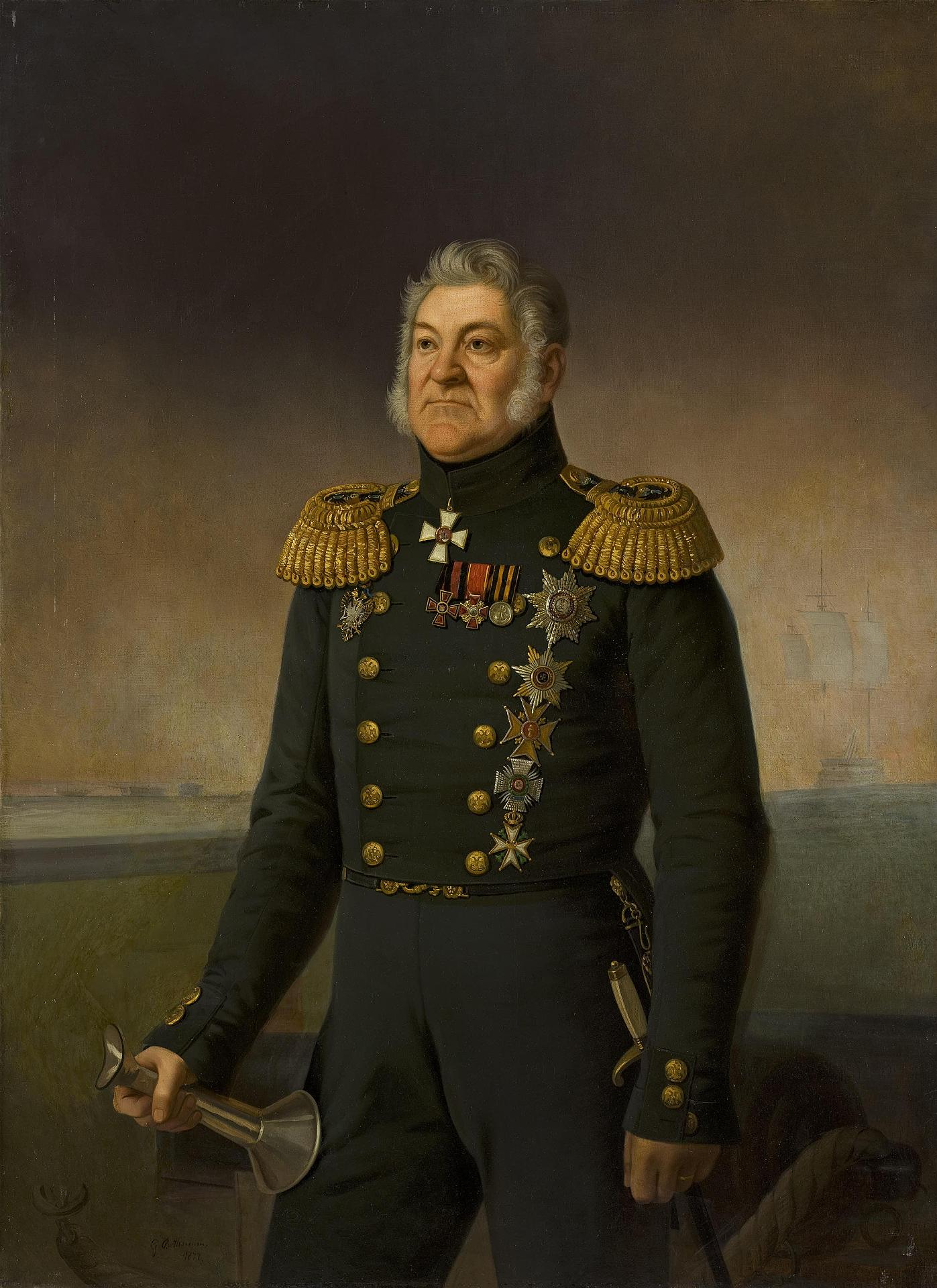
Heiden by Egor Bothmann

== Sources ==
- "Гейден, Логин Петрович" . Brockhaus and Efron Encyclopedic Dictionary (in Russian). 1906.
