= List of convention centres in the Netherlands =

There are several convention centres in the Netherlands. Traditionally there is a distinction in the Netherlands between convention centres for meetings and those for exhibitions/trade shows. Over the past decades this distinction has become blurred, as exhibition facilities have added meeting rooms and meeting centred venues have opened exhibition halls. Also, most of the bigger hotels have built meeting rooms, some of them for large scale (international) gatherings.

The following list is sorted by province:

== Drenthe ==
- Prins Bernhardhoeve, Zuidlaren: 16.000 m² (0,006 mi²)

== Friesland ==
- WTC Expo, Leeuwarden: 30.000 m² (0,01 mi²)

== Gelderland ==
- GelreDome, Arnhem

== Groningen ==
- MartiniPlaza, Groningen

== Limburg ==
- MECC, Maastricht: 30.000 m² (0,01 mi²)

== North Brabant ==
- 1931 Congrescentrum, Brabanthallen, 's-Hertogenbosch: 55.000 m²
- Evoluon, Eindhoven
- NH Conference Centre Koningshof, Veldhoven: 9.000m²

== North Holland ==
- Amsterdam RAI Exhibition and Convention Centre, Amsterdam: 112.200 m²
- Beurs van Berlage, Amsterdam: 18.000 m² (up to 1300 delegates)

== South Holland ==
- Ahoy, Rotterdam
- De Broodfabriek, Rijswijk
- De Doelen, Rotterdam
- World Forum Convention Center, The Hague
- GIA Trade & Exhibition Centre, The Hague

== Utrecht ==
- Jaarbeurs, Utrecht: 100.000 m² (0,04 mi²)
