= Spellenspektakel =

Dutch board game event

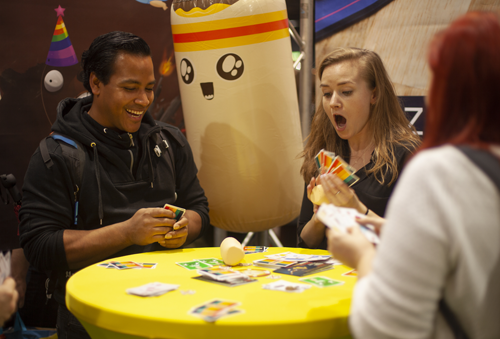
- People trying a game at the Spellenspektakel.
- Status: Active
- Genre: Convention
- Frequency: Annually
- Venue: Jaarbeurs
- Location: Utrecht
- Coordinates: 52°5′N 5°7′E
- Country: Netherlands
- Years active: 34
- Previous event: 9–10 November 2024
- Next event: 8–9 November 2025
- Participants: Asmodee, 999 Games, White Goblin Games, Jumbo Games, Ravensburger, Goliath Games
- Attendance: 30,000
- Major events: Board Game demonstrations
- Website: https://www.spellenspektakel.nl

The Spellenspektakel is the largest board game convention in the Netherlands, featuring game demonstrations, tournaments and other game related activities. It focusses on traditional strategy boardgames, collectible card games, pen-and-paper role-playing games and miniatures wargames. Game publishers participate by showing and demonstrating their new releases to the public. Additionally, the Spellenspektakel hosts numerous game stores and player communities. Visitors can try any game on display and buy the ones they prefer. During the 2024 edition at the Jaarbeurs venue in Utrecht, the Spellenspektakel had over 30,000 attendees.

== History ==
Established in 1992 as a small wargaming event in Eindhoven, the Spellenspektakel experienced fast-paced growth as part of Dutch game publisher 999 Games. This company invested heavily in the new Magic: The Gathering collectible card game, which dominated the Spellenspektakel in the early years. After the Dutch release of Catan, boardgames enjoyed newfound popularity in the Netherlands which shifted the focus of the convention to board games as well.

In 2007 the Spellenspektakel was sold to Libéma and moved to the IJsselhallen in Zwolle. But after three editions with declining visitor numbers, it was cancelled in 2009. The ownership returned to 999 Games, who didn't initiate any new editions. The Spellenspektakel was acquired by Qdose B.V., subsidiary of Castlefest organiser Vana Events, and moved back to Eindhoven in 2012. As the Eindhoven venue closed down, the Spellenspektakel relocated to the Jaarbeurs in Utrecht in 2019.

Since 2023, the Speelgoed Festival (Toy Festival) is a part of the Spellenspektakel and in 2024 the collectible card game event CardCon was launched as a permanent addition. While CardCon is presented as a separate event, it's hosted in conjunction with the Spellenspektakel and visitors have access between both events with a single ticket.
