= NIC Zuidlaren =

NIC Zuidlaren is an international horse riding competition in Zuidlaren, the Netherlands.

== Overview ==
NIC Zuidlaren is the abbreviation of Noordelijk Internationaal Concours hippique Zuidlaren (Dutch), which might be translated in English as Northern International Equestrian Contest Zuidlaren. In English (as also in Dutch) NIC Zuidlaren is the common name to be used for the event. Zuidlaren stands for the name of the village where the contest takes place. Zuidlaren is a village in the north of the Netherlands, which is why the contest refers to 'Northern' in its name. The realization of the event is largely under control of event organization BCM. NIC Zuidlaren offers international equestrianism in 3 different disciplines: jumping; dressage and combined driving.

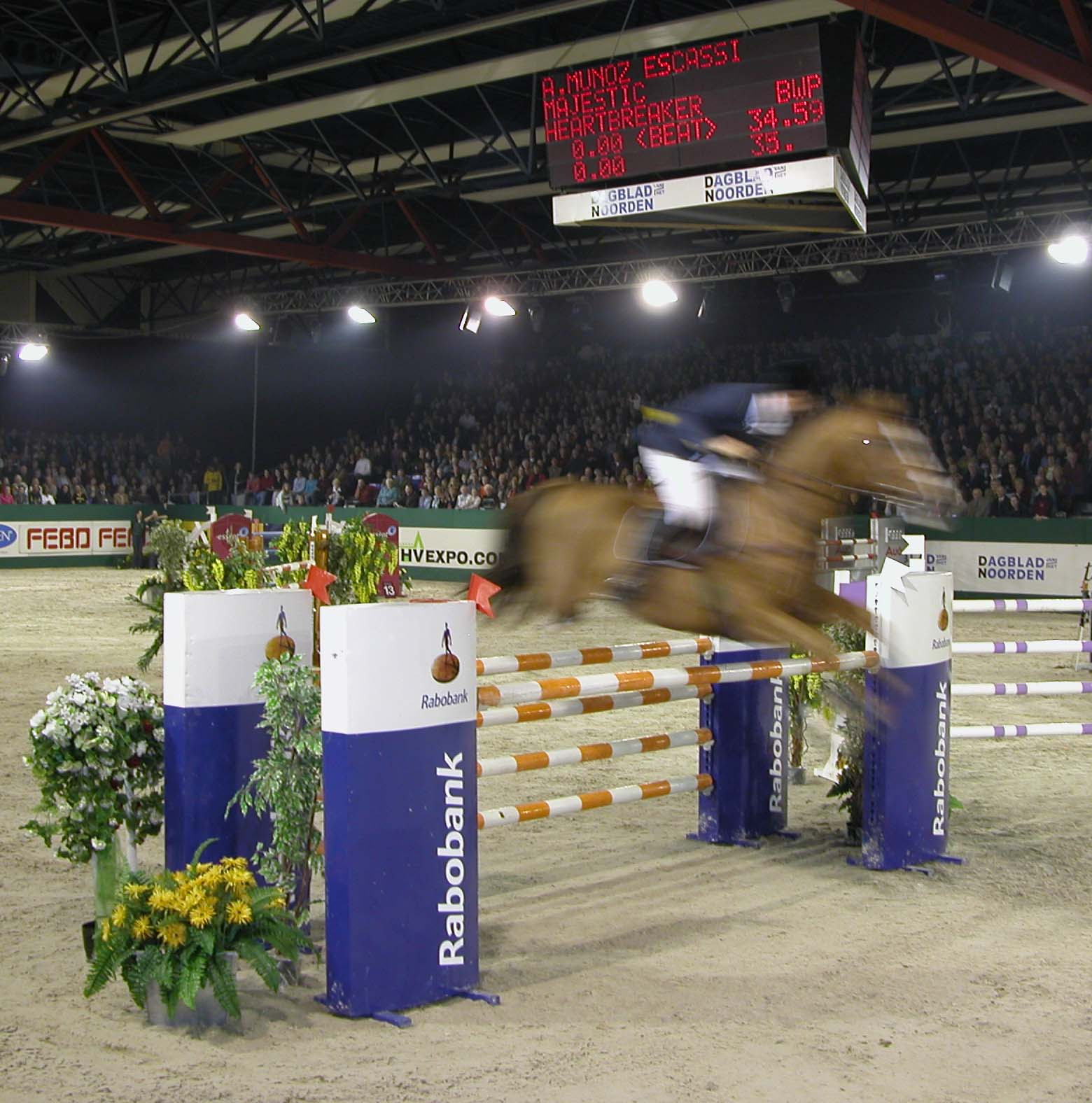
Equestrian on a horse during NIC Zuidlaren 2004.

== 50 years of NIC Zuidlaren ==
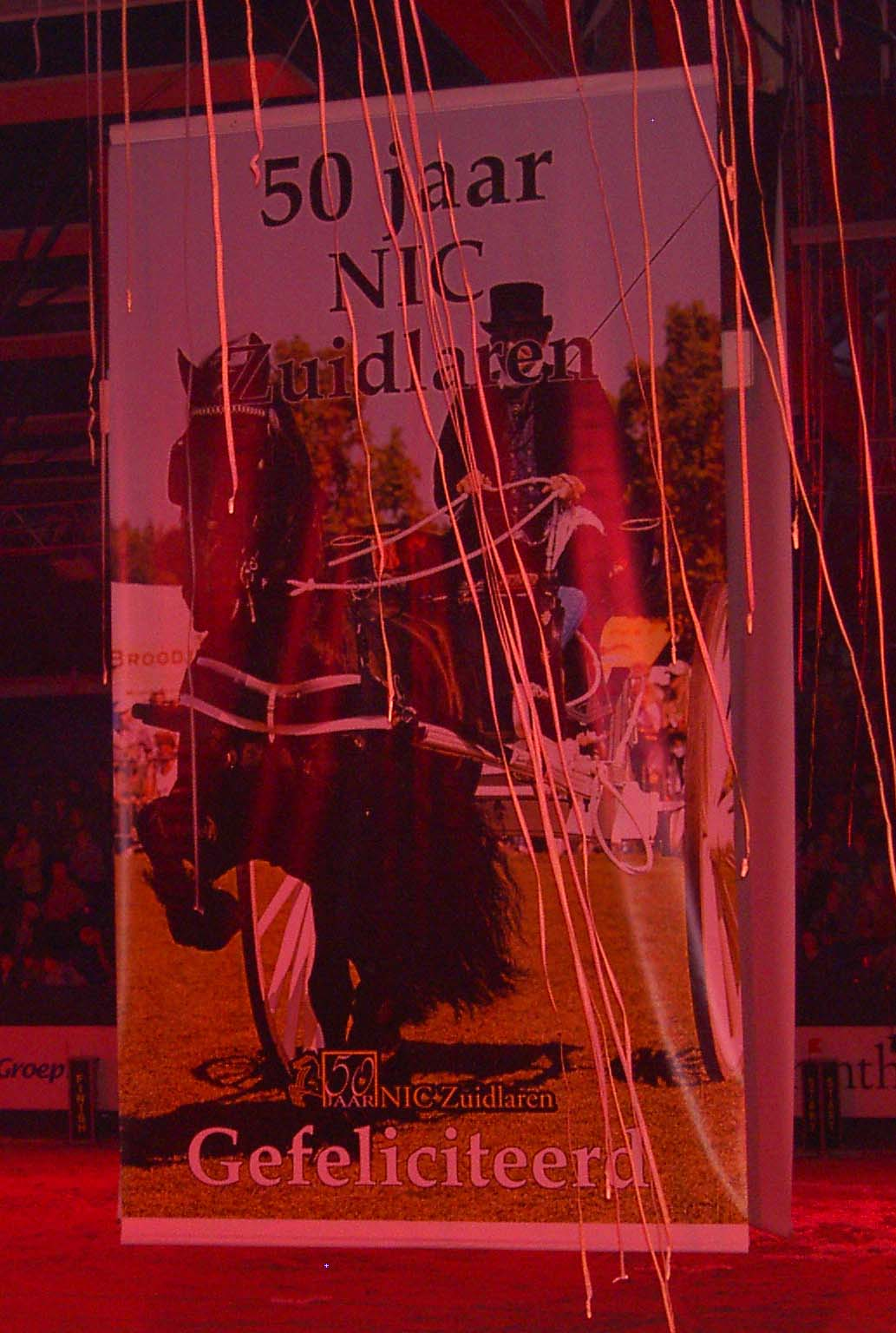
NIC Zuidlaren jubilee celebration, 2004.

In 2004, NIC Zuidlaren took place for the fiftieth time in history. It all happened in the Prins Bernhardhoeve exhibition complex in Zuidlaren. The event took 5 days and 36.000 visitors came to see the show. The fiftieth edition was special, because of the jubilee celebration. Queen Beatrix of the Netherlands accompanied the event, there were special shows and Mr. W. Roelfsema quit his NIC Zuidlaren presidency.
