= Brabanthallen =

Convention center in The Netherlands

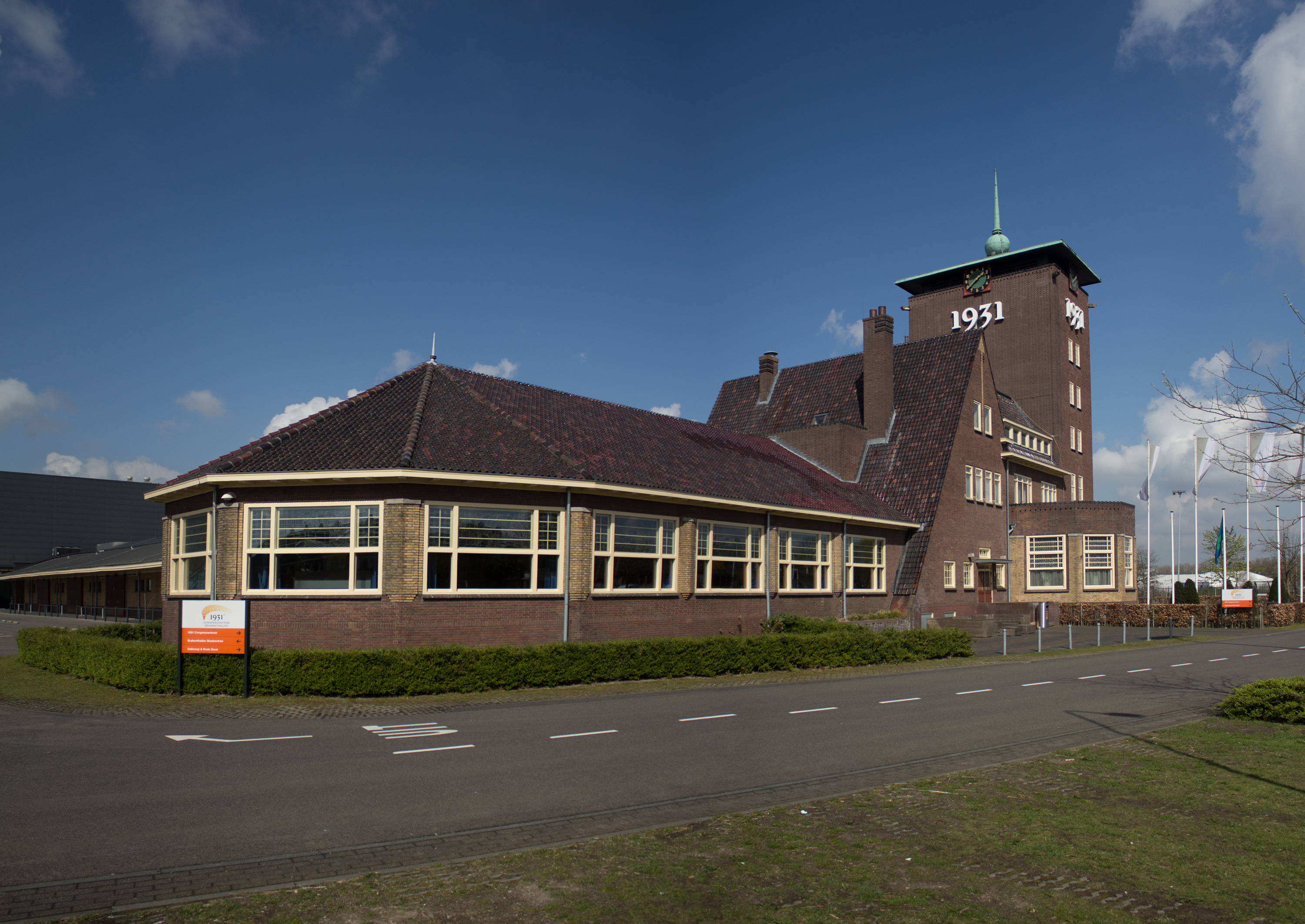
- Main building of the Brabanthallen (2017)
- Interactive map of Brabanthallen
- Location: 's-Hertogenbosch, Netherlands
- Coordinates: 51.701111°N 5.289722°E
- Operator: Libéma

Construction
- Built: 1931
- Renovated: 2004
- Expanded: 2017
- Architect: Piet van Kessel

The Brabanthallen (Dutch pronunciation: [ˈbraːbɑntˌɦɑlə(n)]; literally "Brabant Halls") is a convention center in 's-Hertogenbosch, Netherlands. Every year, it hosts several exhibitions, conferences, trade fairs, concerts and other big events. It is the third largest convention center in the Netherlands, after RAI Amsterdam and Jaarbeurs Utrecht.

== See also ==
- List of convention centres in the Netherlands
