= Commercial Horticultural Association =

UK trade association

- Founded: 1978
- Headquarters: The White House; High Street, Brasted; Near Westerham; Kent, TN16 1JE
- Chairperson: Pat Flynn
- Secretary: Amanda Sizer-Barrett MBE
- Treasurer: Don Pearce
- Association Manager: Stuart Booker

The Commercial Horticultural Association (CHA) is the UK Trade Association representing and supporting companies that manufacture and supply plants, products and services to commercial horticultural growers throughout the world.

== History ==
CHA was established in 1978 under the name Commercial Horticultural Exhibitors Group (CHEG) to assist exhibitors at UK Trade show to negotiate collectively with exhibition organisers. In 19?? it expanded its remit to become a trade Association and the name changed to the Commercial Horticultural Association.

The CHA was for many years administered by Brian Dunsby from offices in Harrogate, Yorkshire. When Brian retired in 1997 the administration was taken over by Groundcover Services based at Stoneleigh Park, Kenilworth, Warwichshire. Finally in 2009 the administration passed to the Federation of Garden and Leisure Manufacturers based in Brasted, Kent. Day-to-day administration remains under the care of Stuart Booker who retains an office at Stoneleigh Park.

== Objectives ==
The Association represent the interests of exhibitors at British trade shows and selected markets overseas and to answering queries and promoting its members products and services and British horticulture as a whole throughout the world. The Association's prime functions are fact-finding, liaison and co-ordination.

Its Mission is;

"to help improve the business environment by identifying the needs of companies within the horticultural supplies sector and to help them to promote their products in the UK and overseas"

The CHA publishes an annual Buyers Guide and Members' Handbook which is circulated at horticultural shows and exhibitions in the UK and overseas as well as through overseas embassies, international journals and to individual enquirers.

== Export Promotion ==
The CHA is an Accredited Trade Organisation under the Tradeshow Access Programme (TAP) run by UK Trade & Investment, a cross government organisation combining the export activities of the Department for Business, Innovation and Skills and the Foreign and Commonwealth Office. Working in conjunction with the Department for Environment, Food and Rural Affairs (DEFRA), UK Trade & Investment (UKTI) and the International Agri-Technology Centre (IATC) the association organises UK pavilions at selected overseas trade shows, recruits potential exhibitors and, in conjunction with other government support agencies, assists them to plan and execute their export strategy.

The CHA has organised pavilions at;

AgriShow	Ribeirao Preto	Brazil
Agritech	Lima	Peru
Growtech	Johannesburg	South Africa
Growtech Eurasia	Antalya	Turkey
Hortec	Nairobi	Kenya
Horti Fair	Amsterdam	The Netherlands
International Plant Fair (IPM)	Essen	Germany
Fruit Logistica	Berlin	Germany
Hortec Kenya	Nairobi	Kenya
Naivasha Horticultural Fair	Naivasha	Kenya
IPM Dubai	Dubai	UAE
Salon du Vegetal	Angers	France

It has also been involved in missions to Costa Rica, El Salvador, Guatemala, Honduras, Kenya, Mexico, Peru, Turkey and Syria.

The association is planning to add Fruit Logistica, Berlin, Germany to this list in 2011.
