= Zuidlaardermarkt =

Annual market in Zuidlaren, Netherlands

Coordinates: 53.0936°N 6.6869°E

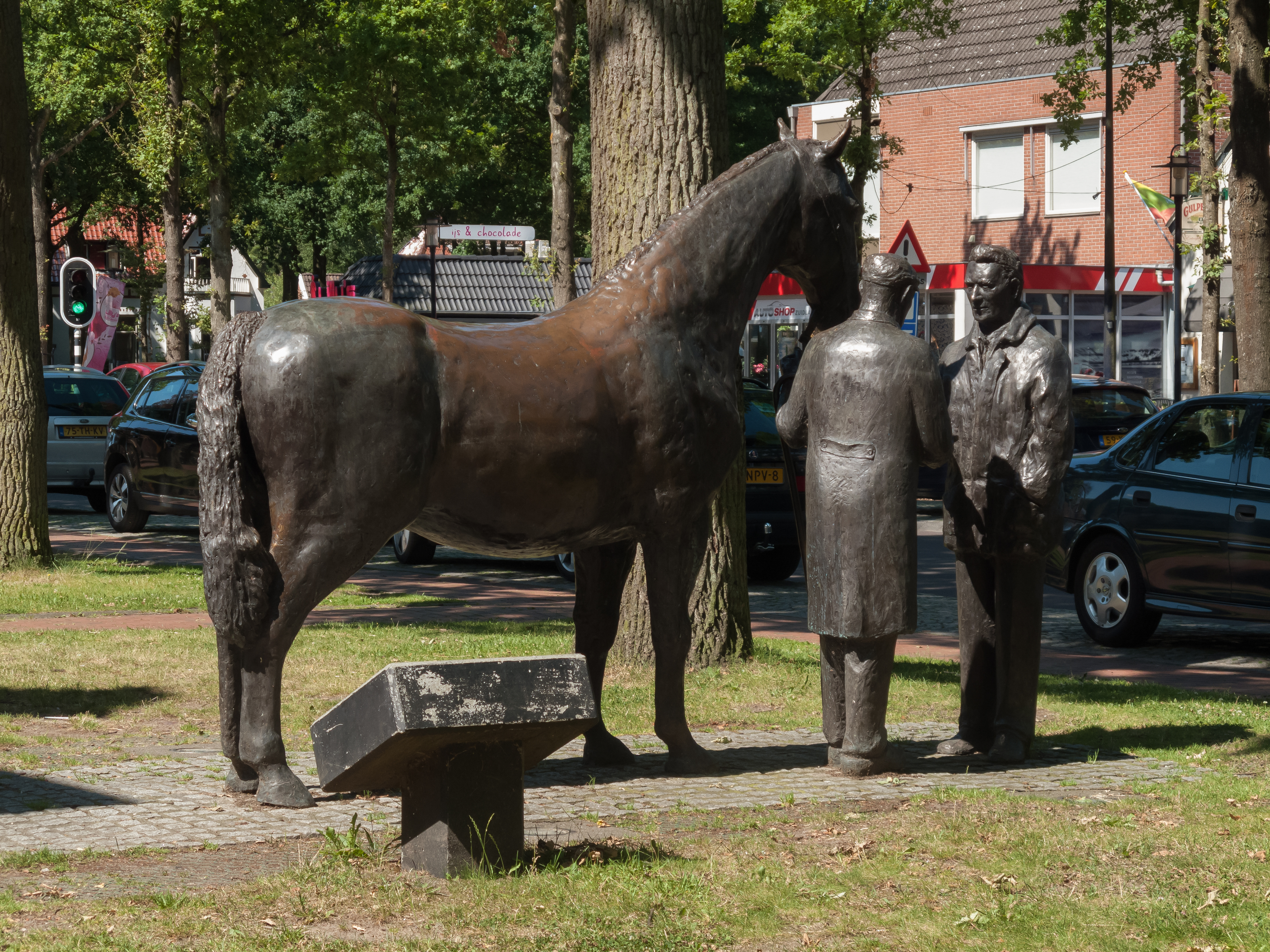
Zuidlaren, sculpture: het Zuidlaardermarktmonument

The Zuidlaardermarkt (Dutch: Market of Zuidlaren) is an annual horse and country market in Zuidlaren, Netherlands. It is held on the third Tuesday in October. The horse market is the largest in Europe.

The country market has about 350 market stalls each year, with a total length of 2.3 miles. The fair is located in the centre of the village near the horse market. The event enjoys popularity and large attendance by Dutch, German and Belgian horsetraders.

Market manager is Jaap Mellema from Tynaarlo. The organization of the event involves a lot of volunteers, including a local choir.

== History ==
The first known direct mention of the market dates from 1701. In a letter to the provincial council the organisers ask permission to hold the market on the third Tuesday in October. The market was already held before this date.

There also is a charter from 1232 that talks about a market in 'Laren', shortly after the second World War it was thought that this charter should certainly refer to the Zuidlaardermarkt. In order to celebrate the '750th anniversary' in 1950, the start year 1201 was conveniently taken. Nowadays it is considered more likely that this market was located in Noordlaren at the time and held was in May instead of the fall.

Since the foot-and-mouth disease breakout of 2001, bovine animals are no longer shown.

In 2004, 1883 horses and 62 donkeys were supplied to the Zuidlaardermarkt.
