= MECC Maastricht =

Event arena in the Netherlands

Maastricht Exhibition & Conference Centre
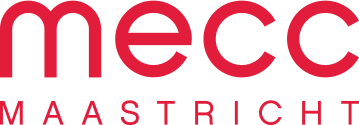

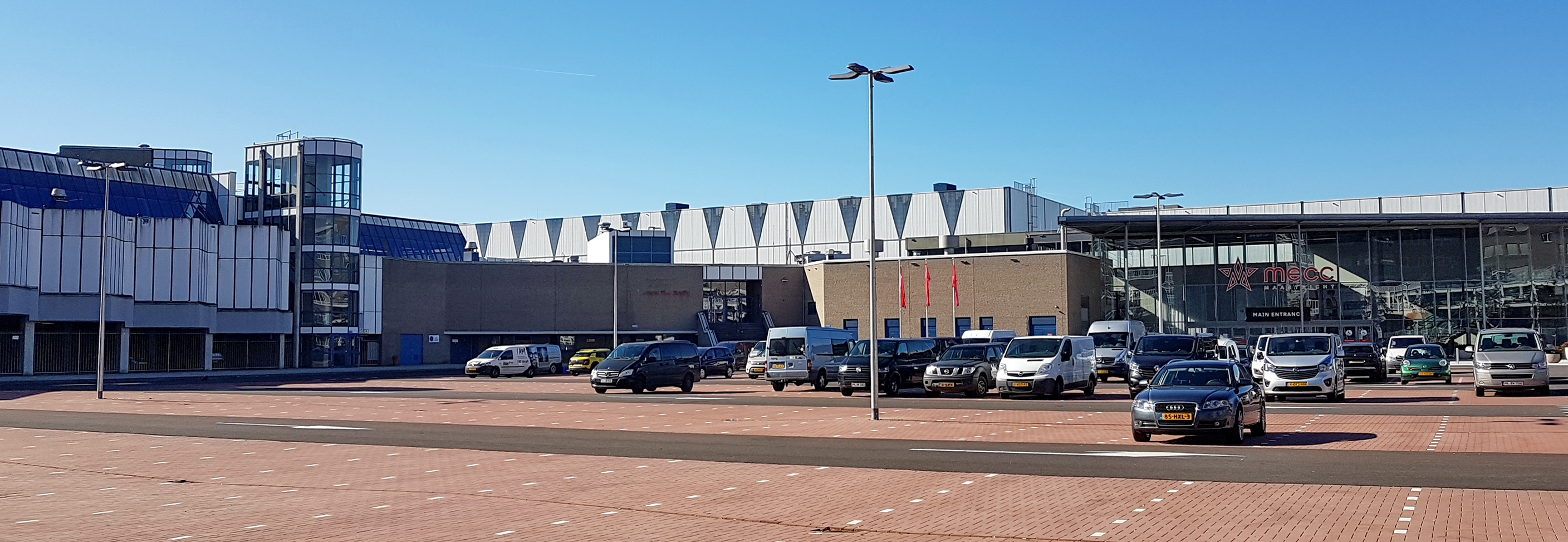
- Interactive map of Maastricht Exhibition & Conference Centre
- Location: Maastricht, Netherlands
- Coordinates: 50.8391°N 5.7123°E
- Owner: Municipality of Maastricht
- Public transit: Maastricht Randwyck railway station

Construction
- Opened: 23 September 1988

Website
- mecc.nl

The Maastricht Exhibition & Conference Centre (shortened as MECC Maastricht) is a convention centre in Maastricht, Netherlands, located in the city's Randwyck district. It is well known for hosting the annual European Fine Art Fair (TEFAF), which is considered one of the world's leading art fairs. MECC Maastricht was a shortlisted candidate to host the Eurovision Song Contest 2020, losing to Rotterdam Ahoy.

== Gallery ==
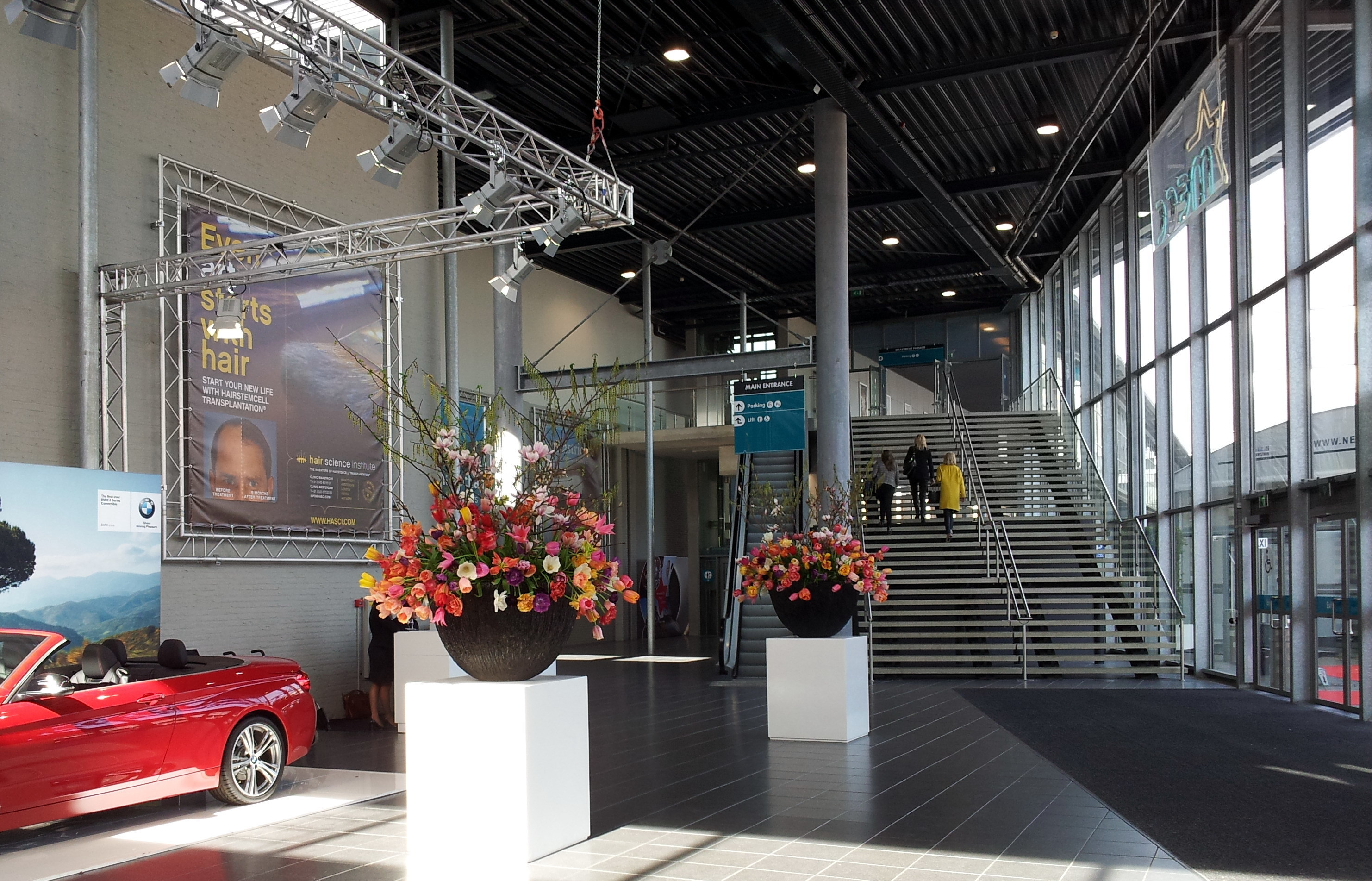
Interior

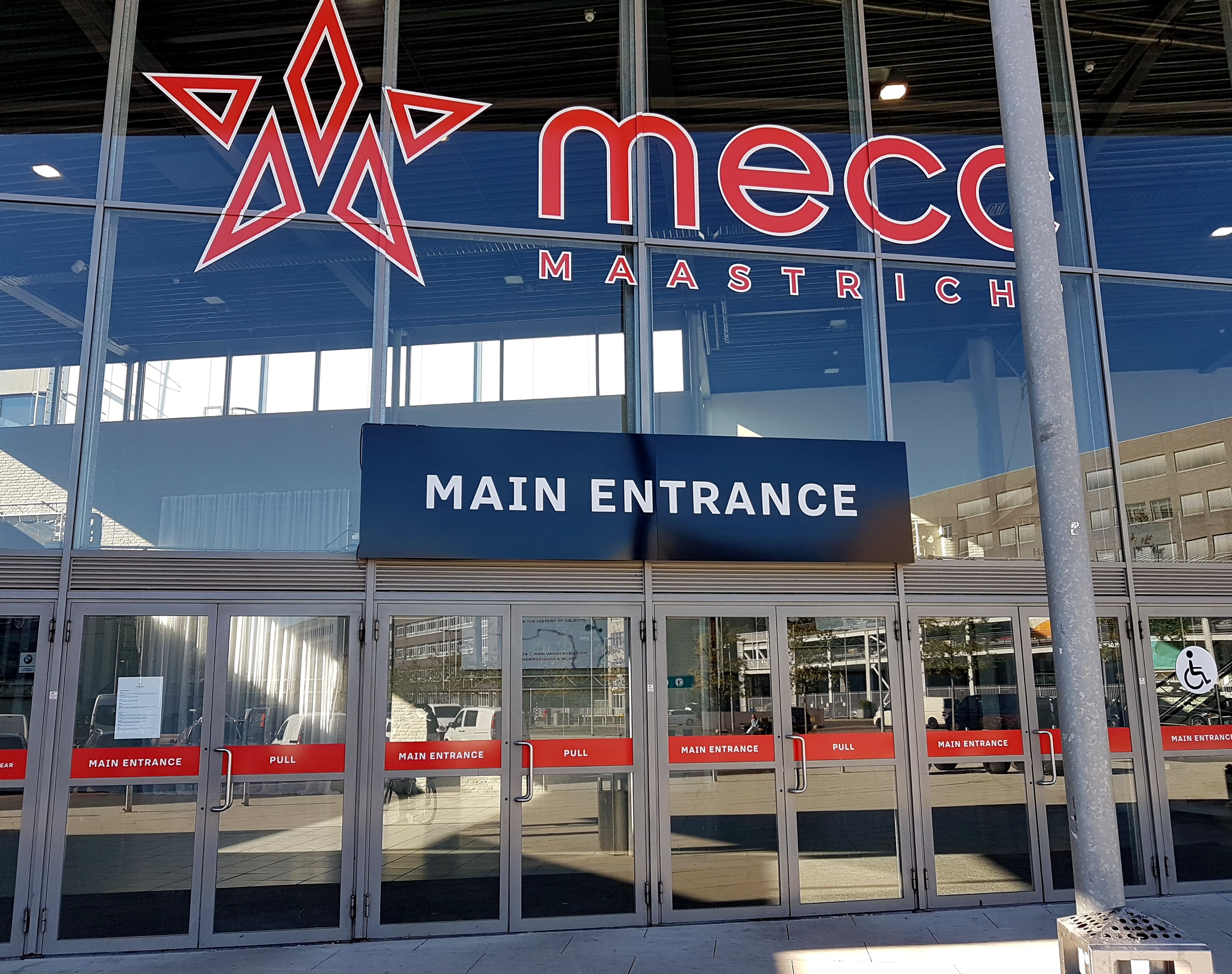
Main entrance

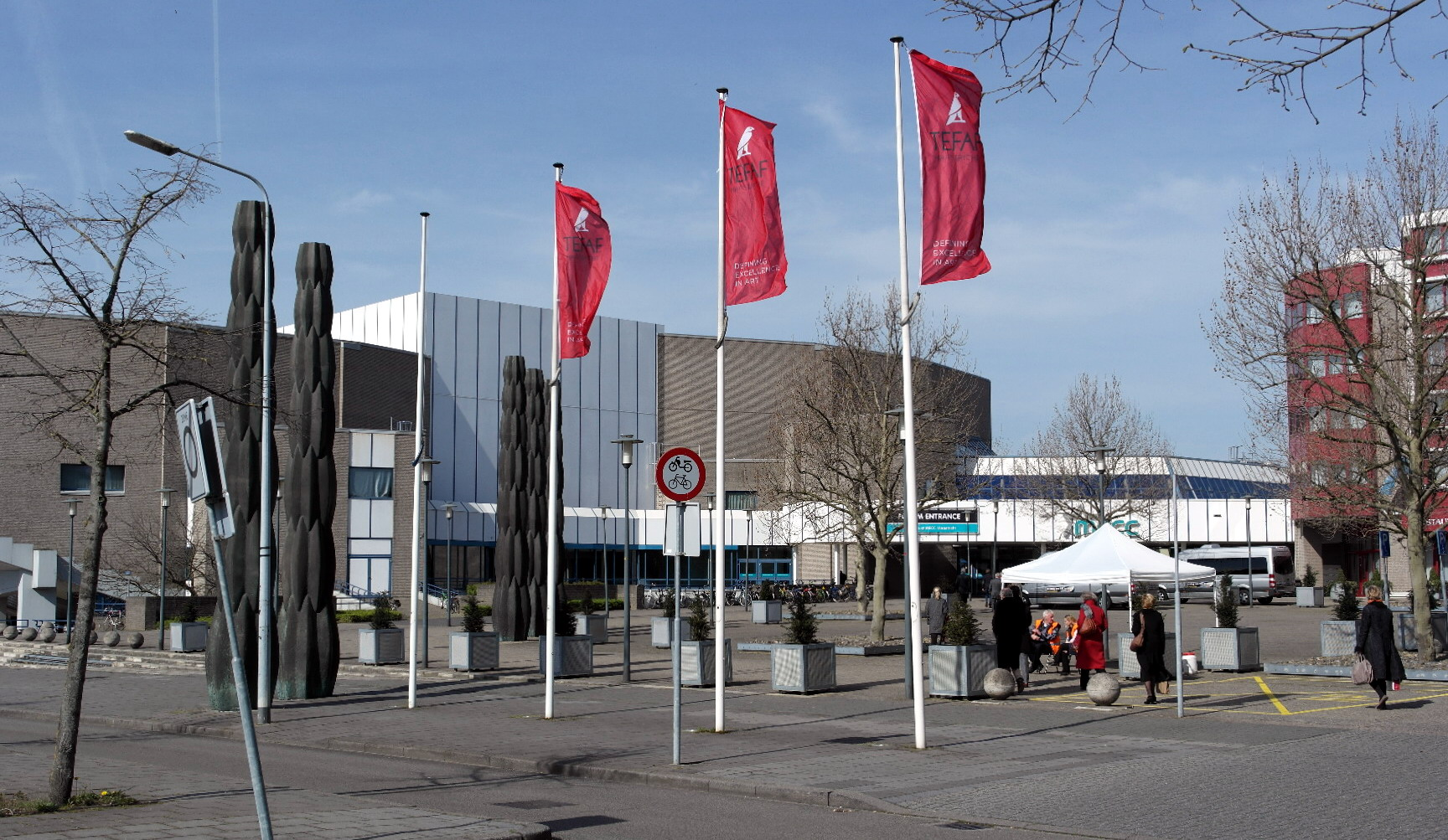
View from Forum square

== See also ==
- List of convention centres in the Netherlands
