= HISWA =

The voluntary association HISWA is an industry trade group for the Netherlands water sports business. HISWA is famous for a twice-yearly organized consumer trade show for the water sports public.

Since 1933 these trade shows have been held at the start of the water sports season in Amsterdam at the RAI convention center and near the end of the season at the HISWA te water (HISWA in water) in IJmuiden yacht harbor.

== History ==
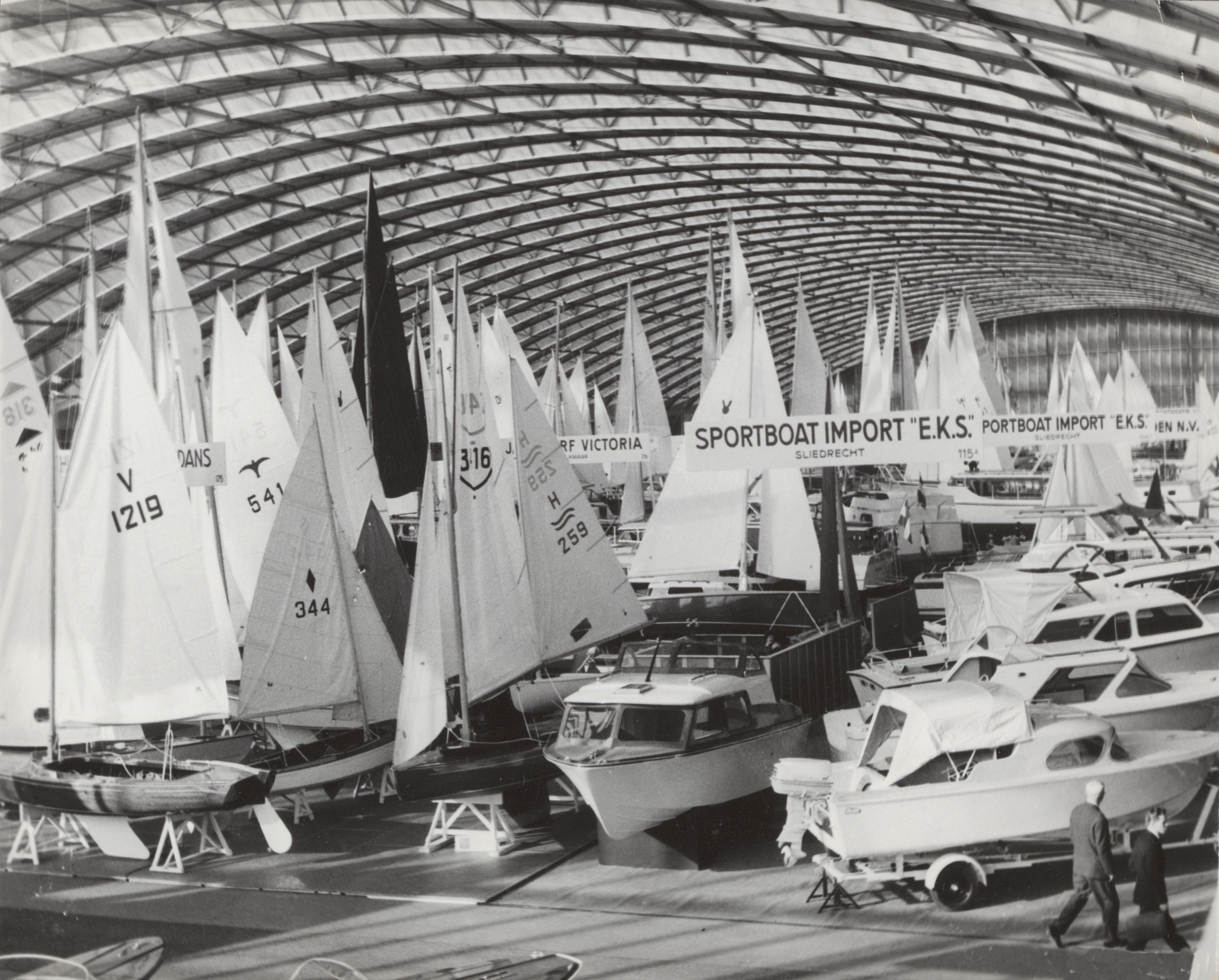
HISWA 1965

On 16 April 1932, a number of boat builders and dealers, including Fred J. Kemper, HW de Voogt, G. de Vries Lentsch Jr. and Carl Denig, set up the Dutch Association for Handel [trade] and Industrie the area of Shipbuilders and Watersport. The interest group's main goal is to periodically hold exhibitions. In 1933 the association organized the first exhibition HISWA Trade Fair. This took place in the RAI in Amsterdam Ferdinand Bolstraat. From 1935, the fair moved to take place at the Apollo building. In 1963 followed the move to the new RAI-complex on the Europe Square, which has since become the permanent accommodation of the exhibition held each spring. In recent decades the HISWA is not every year. Due to economic conditions, sometimes a fair is skipped. In 2005, HISWA celebrated its 50th anniversary exhibition. The HISWA Association that year existed 73 years. In the eighties, the growing association found itself more and more worried concerning on the one hand the organization and promotion to the show-exhibition and on the other hand the interests of all its members. Therefore, the association decides to transfer the organization and operation of the exhibition in 1987 over to Amsterdam RAI. From 2002 to 2008 work was done in a "joint venture" as a grouping, HISWA RAI Multimedia B.V. On January 1, 2008, this partnership dissolved and Amsterdam RAI since then accounts for the organization and operation of the HISWA spring fair. HISWA Multimedia BV from January 1, 2008, organizes the "HISWA te Water". HISWA Association and HISWA Multimedia B.V. have offices in Driebergen.

== RAI Boat Show ==
HISWA-Amsterdam International Boat and Water Sports Show is the largest watersport event of its kind in the Netherlands. In Amsterdam, just before the start of the boating season is the HISWA-Amsterdam Boat Show at the RAI Amsterdam. Near the end of each watersport season is the "HISWA te water" in IJmuiden.

== Boat of the Year ==
Annually at the HISWA at the RAI, a "HISWA Boat of the year" is chosen. This is in two categories - sailyacht and motoryacht.

- 2009 - the motoryacht Vivante 43 Cabrio Cruiser
- 2008 - the sailyacht Sunbeam 34 and the motoryacht Fjord 40 Open
- 2007 - the sailyacht Saffier 32 and the motoryacht Kuster A-42
- 2006 - the sailyacht Standfast 43 and the motoryacht Wajer Osprey 37
- 2005 - the sailyacht C-Yacht 12.50 and the motoryacht Mochi 51 Dolphin
- 2004 - the open sailyacht G2 and the motoryacht Boorncruiser 35 Classic Line OC
- 2003 - the sailyacht MaxFun 35 and the motoryacht ONJ Loodsboot 1020

== Association HISWA ==
HISWA Association is the umbrella organisation for all business types in the watersport industry. It consists of approximately 1200 large and small member companies in 17 industry sectors. These companies represent two thirds of the turnover and employment in this sector. The watersport industry is a diverse industry, from yacht building, supply, trade, import, repair and maintenance, storage, rental, brokerage, design and expertise. HISWA Association's activities have two objectives: primarily supporting its members in their business and collective interests to ensure a healthy environment for the sector. As well, the association is part of international, European and national records as the drafting of watersport laws, the Swimming Waters Directive and the Water Framework Directive. At a regional level, HISWA performs as a lobby on issues such as dredging plans, nautical infrastructure, water sports promotion, zoning and water tax. The HISWA Association has approximately 35 employees.

== HISWA Symposium ==
The HISWA International Symposium on Yacht Design and Yacht Construction is related to the field of yacht building and yacht construction and its relation to the scientific developments in these fields. It is organised by HISWA Association, Delft University of Technology and Amsterdam RAI. This symposium was started in 1969 and is held yearly at the RAI convention center in Amsterdam. The 21st event was held in 2010 on November 15 and 16. The symposium is associated with the Marine Equipment Trade Show (METS).
