= Willem Tanke =

Dutch organist and pianist

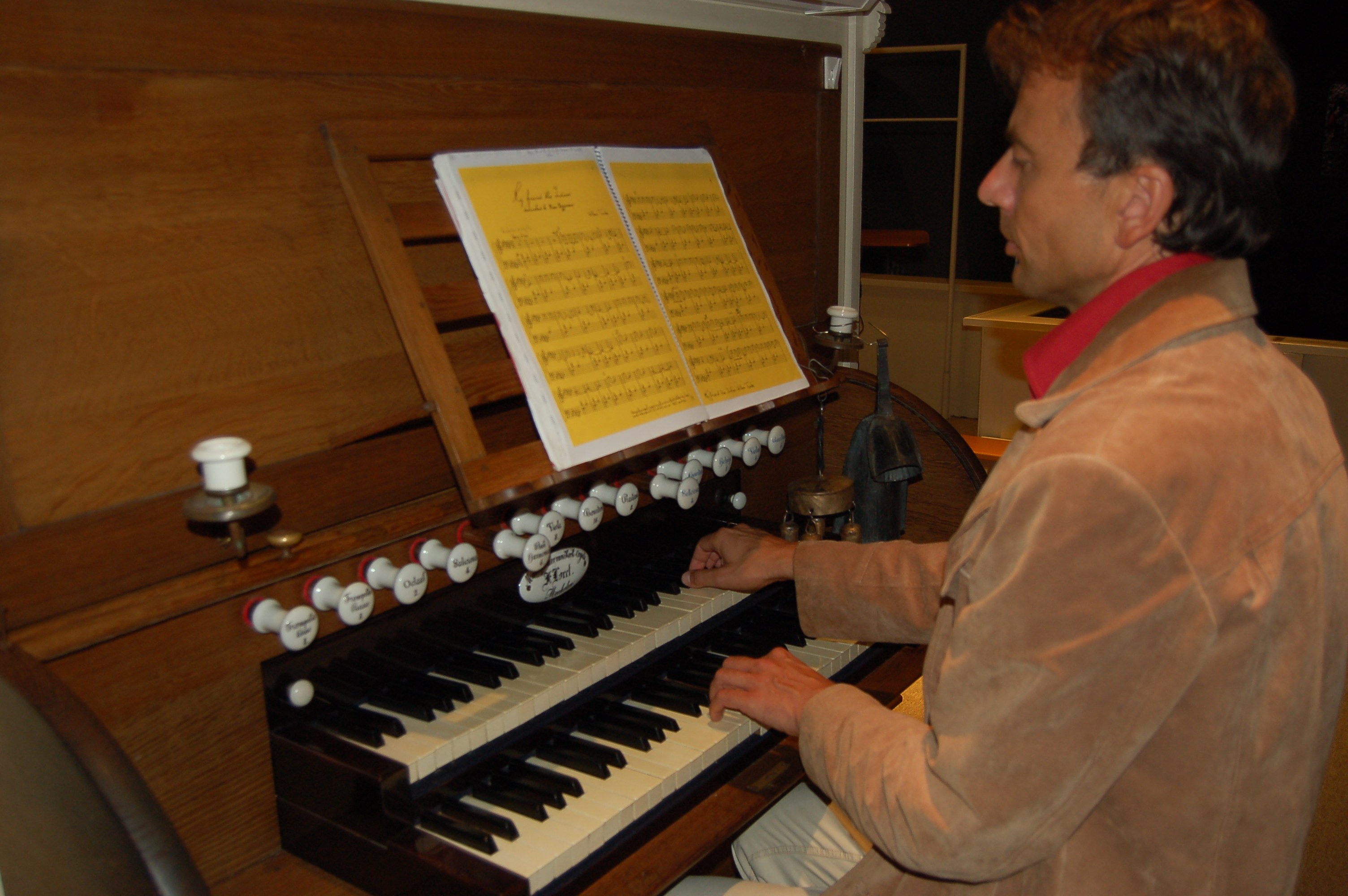
- Born: April 4, 1959 (age 67); Hengelo, the Netherlands
- Occupations: Organist, Pianist
- Years active: 1980s-present
- Website: www.willemtanke.com

Willem Tanke (born April 4, 1959, in Hengelo, the Netherlands) is an organist and recitalist known for his interpretations of works by J.S. Bach, Max Reger, Olivier Messiaen and contemporary composers. In addition, he is noted for his own musical language as an improviser and a performing composer. As a teenager, he was drawn to the organ by the religiously inspired music of J.S. Bach and Olivier Messiaen, and also John Coltrane.

== Career ==
Willem Tanke studied organ and improvisation with Jan Welmers, music theory with Joep Straesser and electronic music with Ton Bruynel at Utrecht Conservatory from 1977 till 1985. He concluded his studies with the Performance Diploma for Organ with full marks (the grade of 10 and honours), and also with diplomas for music theory and improvisation.

In 1984 he sent a recording of Olivier Messiaen's Livre d'orgue to the composer and received an enthusiastic letter from Messiaen's wife, the pianist Yvonne Loriod, assisting him to obtain a scholarship from the Dutch government and the Prins Bernhard Foundation for advanced studies of Messiaen's organ works, which he undertook with Jennifer Bate in London and Almut Rößler in Düsseldorf in the late '80s.

In the early part of his career Willem Tanke specialized in the interpretation of organ works by Olivier Messiaen, Max Reger and late 20th century composers. In 1994 he performed Messiaen's complete organ works in Haarlem, Puebla, and Guadalajara.

Between 1972 and 1988 Willem Tanke was organist for various Roman Catholic churches in Hengelo and De Bilt. From 1989 until 2003 he was organist at St. Willibrordus Church in Berkel-Enschot, where he made recordings for his CDs, "My friend the Indian and other pieces" and "Imaginary Day". His Super Audio CD "Meditations for a lent" consists entirely of recordings made at the Loret organ in Berkel-Enschot. Between 1998 and 2000 he was also organist of the Scots International Reformed Church in Rotterdam. Accompanying the African choir there, he learnt around forty songs from in particular Ghana and Cameroon.

In the 21st century Willem Tanke became increasingly known as an improviser and a performing composer, solo and with other musicians. In 2006 he developed the 'rolling wrist' technique: the wrist rolls over the keyboard in order to produce fluent clusters and suggest micro-tones.

Willem Tanke was a professor of organ as a main subject at Utrecht University of Professional Arts Education from 1988 until 2000. Since 2001 he has been teaching theory and improvisation at Codarts University for the Arts. From 2006 until 2008 he carried out research for Codarts World Music Research Group called "The Art of Doing Nothing". This research aimed at "improving mental and physical preconditions for musicianship by creating a good balance between performing, improvising and composing, with the help of analysis and research." For the instruction of students who participated in "The Art of Doing Nothing" the following text was used:

"At the beginning there is silence, which allows a good performing attitude to develop, with a calm, concentrated mind, a relaxed body and steady breathing from the lower stomach. With this attitude improvisation results in, for example, a number of rhythmic patterns and melodies. Of these, the most interesting are remembered, recorded, or written down on paper. Gradually, after some hours, days, or even months, a certain structure will be developed, based on the composer's judgment of the right balance between repetition, variation and contrast. At the end, the various improvisations crystallize into a composition. This composition has to be learned by heart, because the discipline of memorizing the rhythmic patterns and melodies is necessary for developing the freedom from which new improvisations can be created. This procedure has a certain resemblance to improvising and composing in, for instance, classical Indian and Iranian music. Brief compositions may be the starting-point for numerous improvisations that can ultimately lead to new compositions. The process is somewhat similar to the continuous changes that take place in any living language."

In 2006 and 2007 Willem Tanke lectured at the National Centre for the Performing Arts in Mumbai, organized by the ITC-Sangeet Research Academy.

In 2008 he gave a lecture-recital at a symposium on Olivier Messiaen organized by the Lemmensinstituut in Leuven, Belgium.

Tanke issued his own improvisations and compositions on CD and Super Audio CD between 1997 and 2007. From then onwards he published his music in particular on his YouTube channel. In 2018 he created a website called "Playing Keyboard Instruments in the 21st Century" in order to document his expertise in playing the pipe organ, the piano and synthesizers/keyboards.

== Discography ==
As a primary artist - classical organist

1999 8 CD-box Olivier Messiaen Complete Organ Works

2006 Super Audio CD Max Reger - Variationen und Fuge fis-moll über ein Originalthema op. 73; Willem Tanke - Two Wind Fantasies

2007 Remastered 8 CD-box Olivier Messiaen Complete Organ Works

2008 2 DVD-set Olivier Messiaen Livre d’ orgue/Organ Works

As a primary artist - improviser/performing composer

1997 CD Spiritual Homeland works for Yamaha SY99 synthesizer

2001 CD My friend the Indian and other pieces with Hans Kulk, analogue synthesizer, Martijn Alsters, wind midi controller and René van Commenée, percussion

2005 CD Imaginary Day - 21 Fantasies for organ

2006 Super Audio CD Max Reger - Variationen und Fuge fis-moll über ein Originalthema op. 73; Willem Tanke - Two Wind Fantasies

2007 Super Audio CD Meditations for a lent

As a composer:

2006 DVD Ways of Intensity compositions for piano performed by Manila Santini, Ivan Rutkauskas, Ayano Shimada, Eva-Maria Rauter, Fernando Altamura, Viktoriya Yermolyeva, Esra Kalkanoglu and Jordina Milla y Benseny

With other musicians as a classical organist

1993 Looking Ears I Compositions by Ton Bruynel (Tanke plays the organ on track 7, Dust)

1999 Jan Welmers Organ Works (Tanke plays on track 4, Licht en Donker II)

2001 “Ecoute, écoute”! - Compositions by Roderik de Man (Tanke plays the organ on track 2, Vanishing Points)

2004 Looking Ears Complete - Compositions by Ton Bruynel (Tanke plays the organ on CD 1 track 7, Dust, CD 4 track 6, Reliëf, CD 5 track 7, Arc and CD 6 track 4, Kolom)

2006 Mense Ruiter Orgelmakers (Tanke plays the organ on CD 1 tracks 1–7, organ works by J.S. Bach, Joh. Brahms and W. Tanke)

2015 Merkstenen - Compositions by Jan Welmers (Tanke plays the piano on track 5, Monologen)

With other musicians as an improviser

1999 CD The Tao of Physics -Variations for organ, keyboards and processors in collaboration with Vidna Obmana, electronics

2006 Mense Ruiter Orgelmakers (Tanke plays the organ on CD 1 tracks 1–7, organ works by J.S. Bach, Joh. Brahms and W. Tanke)

2011 Genadeloos - Gijs Hendriks (Tanke plays the piano on tracks 6 and 7, Instant Composing Music No 2 and 3)

2012 MultiTasking - Henri Bok (Tanke plays the piano on track 11, Improvisation I, and the organ on track 12, Bell Board)

Not yet issued

2008 Album with Mike Garson for two pianos

== Special projects ==
2002 WIND with visual artist Jan Doms and Vidna Obmana, Biennale Rotterdam

2016 "The Enchanted Desert" for organ, flute and percussion, with dance and performance

2017 "Olivier Messiaen and the Cave of Forgotten Sounds" for organ solo

== Articles ==
2007 "New Ways of Improvisation in Western Classical Music", Journal of the Indian Musicological Society.

2007 "The Art of Doing Nothing", Piano Bulletin European Piano Teachers Association.

2007 "Nieuwe invalshoeken voor compositie en improvisatie", Het Orgel.

2008 "The Art of Doing Nothing", Adem.

2008 "Van Messiaen tot...Improvisaties en composities op vogelgezangen van Messiaen".

== Lectures ==
1992 "Orgelbau und Musiktechnologie", Colloquium "Die Orgel in Ostdeutschland und in Polen", Frankfurt/Oder

2006 "New Ways of Improvisation in Western Classical Music", seminar on Improvisation in Music, ITC Sangeet Research Academy, Mumbai

2007 "Composition as a Framework for Improvisation", seminar on Composing, Composition & Composers in Music, ITC Sangeet Research Academy, Mumbai

2014 "Re-vitalizing a performance practise of the eighteenth and nineteenth century through contemporary improvisation", Royal Music Association, University of Birmingham

2016 "Comment un organiste, non musicien de jazz, peut s'affilier au jazz contemporain par le biais de Messiaen et du jeu avec un joueur de tabla", Université Laval, Québec

== Awards and honors ==
1998 "Silver medal of honor" Nederlandse Sint-Gregoriusvereniging

2000 "Diplôme de Médaille d’argent de la Société Académique d’Éducation et d’Encouragement “Arts-Sciences-Lettres” (Prix Thorlet)"

2015 "Schnittger Dream Prize" for innovation in organ art
