= De Wachter, Zuidlaren =

Windmill in Zuidlaren, Netherlands

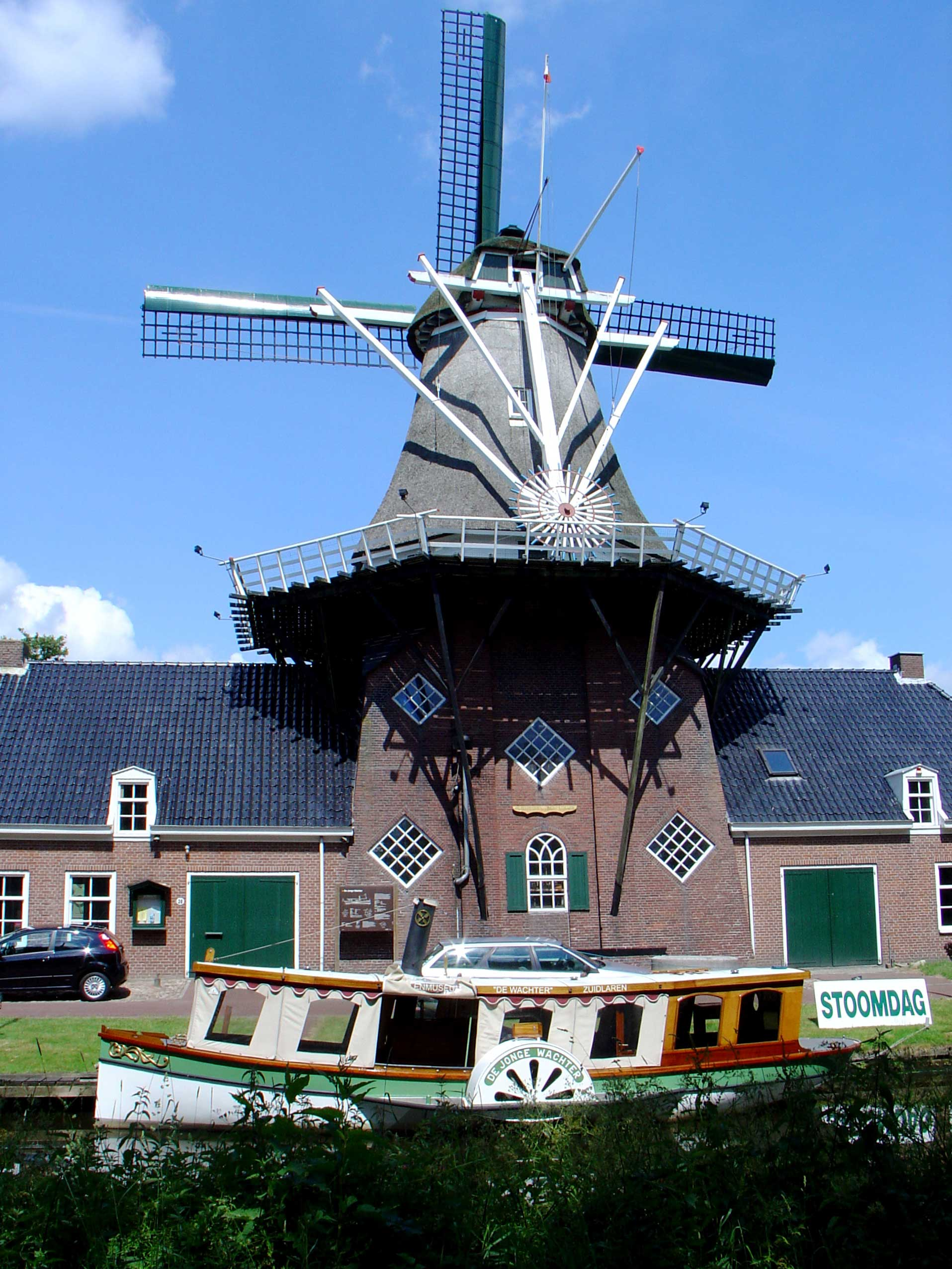
- De Wachter, June 2008
- Interactive map of De Wachter, Zuidlaren

Origin
- Mill name: De Wachter
- Mill location: Havenstraat 36, 9471 AM Zuidlaren
- Coordinates: 53°05′57″N 6°41′44″E
- Operator: Stichting Koren en Oliemolen De Wachter
- Year built: 1851

Information
- Purpose: Corn mill and oil mill
- Type: Smock mill
- Storeys: Three-storey smock
- Base storeys: Four-storey base
- Smock sides: Eight sides
- No. of sails: Four sails
- Type of sails: Common sails, Fauël system
- Windshaft: Cast iron
- Winding: Tailpole and winch
- No. of pairs of millstones: Two pairs
- Size of millstones: 1.40 metres (4 ft 7 in) diameter each

De Wachter (English: The Watchman) is a smock mill in Zuidlaren, Drenthe, which has been restored to working order. The mill was built in 1851 and is listed as a Rijksmonument, number 41064.

== History ==
De Wachter was built in 1851 for the Van Bon family as a corn mill and oil mill. In 1895, the mill was bought by Jan Medendorp, who installed two steam engines as auxiliary power in 1898. The engines were 40 horsepower (30 kW). One steam engine drove an electricity generator while the other was used to power a spice mill. The windmill remaining independent of the auxiliary power. In 1935, the oil mill and spice mill ceased to be used and were dismantled, as were the steam engines. In 1950, Diek Medendorp, the grandson of Jan, decided to close the windmill. Plans were made to preserve the mill, including the restoration of the steam engines. The mill was declared a Rijksmonument by the Ministerie van Cultuur, Recreatie en Maatschappelijk Werk. Between 1968 and 1970 the mill was restored by Diek Medendorp. From 1987, the rest of the mill complex was also restored and in 1989 the mill was transferred into the ownership of the Stichting Koren en Oliemolen De Wachter. The mill complex houses a bakery, a blacksmith's workshop, a butcher's shop, a clog maker's workshop, a grocer's shop, a millwright's workshop and a spice mill. Four steam engines are kept in working order. There is also a waggon maker's workshop. These are all presented as they would have appeared in 1895.

== Description ==
De Wachter is what the Dutch describe as an "achtkante stellingmolen". It is a three-storey smock mill on a four-storey brick base. The stage is at third-floor level, 9.55 metres (31 ft 4 in) above ground level. The smock and cap are thatched. The mill is winded by a tailpole and winch. The four common sails have a span of 22.00 metres (72 ft 2 in). They have leading edges streamlined on the Fauël system. The sails are carried in a cast-iron windshaft which was cast by De Muinck Keizer, Martenshoek in 1904. The windshaft also carries the brake wheel which has 63 cogs. This drives the wallower (33 cogs) at the top of the upright shaft. At the bottom of the upright shaft, the great spur wheel, which has 89 cogs, drives the 1.50 metres (4 ft 11 in) diameter Cullen stones via a lantern pinion stone nut with 33 staves and the 1.50 metres (4 ft 11 in) diameter French Burr stones via a lantern pinion stone nut with 29 staves. A pair of edge runner stones are driven via a lantern pinion stone nut with 29 staves.

== Millers ==
- Van Bon (1851–95)
- Jan Medendorp (1895– )
- Medendorp
- Diek Medendorp ( -1950)

References for above:-

== Public access ==
De Wachter is open to the public on Wednesdays from 13:00 to 16:30 and on Saturdays from 10:00 to 16:30 between May and September.
