= Horti Fair =

The International Horti Fair was an annual horticulture trade fair in the Netherlands.

== History ==
The Horti Fair was a consolidated continuation of the Dutch NTV International Horticulture Trade Fair (since 1972) and the International Flower Trade Show (since 1962). Both exhibitions have been held at the same time since 1997. Since 2000, they have shared the same roof, the Amsterdam RAI Exhibition and Convention Centre.

The exhibition venue, close to international centres of horticultural commerce and knowledge, production areas and Schiphol international airport, attracts over 50,000 professionals a year from 110 countries.

The Horti Fair was a leading platform for the introduction of new products and services in horticulture. New products are judged for the Horti Fair Innovation Award by an international jury of experts. The winners in the Horti Tech and Horti Grow & Trade categories are announced on the first day of the exhibition.

In 2008, Agrexco of Israel won three gold cups for Best Stand (including design, floral arrangements and product displays), Best Floral Arrangement and Best Floral Designer.

In 2013 the International Horti Fair stopped its operations and closed.
