= Prins Bernhardhoeve =

Coordinates: 53°5′35″N 6°41′21″E

- Logo as of 2005

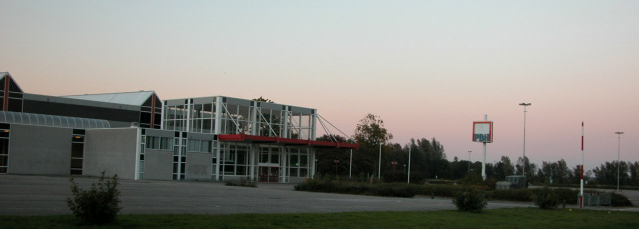
- Main entrance
- Interactive map of the Prins Bernhardhoeve area

Website
- pbh.nl at the Wayback Machine (archived 2006-02-01)

Prins Bernhardhoeve Zuidlaren (PBHZ) was a building complex for fairs and events in Zuidlaren, Netherlands. Opened in 1956, the complex consisted of three halls which were all named after members of the Dutch royal family. The largest hall was the Prince Constantijn hall, situated next to main entrance of the building. The building complex was demolished in 2016.

== Fairs and events ==
In 1999 and 2000 the Domino Day took place in the Prins Bernhardhoeve complex. Jumping Indoor Zuidlaren was an annual horse riding competition in the PBH complex until 2010.

== Surface ==
The surface of the PBHZ building complex where fairs and events were held was 16.000 m^{2}. The surface of the Prince Constantijn hall was 5544 m^{2}. The smallest hall was the Prins Johan Friso hall with a surface of 2820 m^{2}.

== See also ==
- List of convention centres in the Netherlands
