= Laarwoud =

Manor house in Drenthe, Netherlands

Coordinates: 53.0959°N 6.6899°E

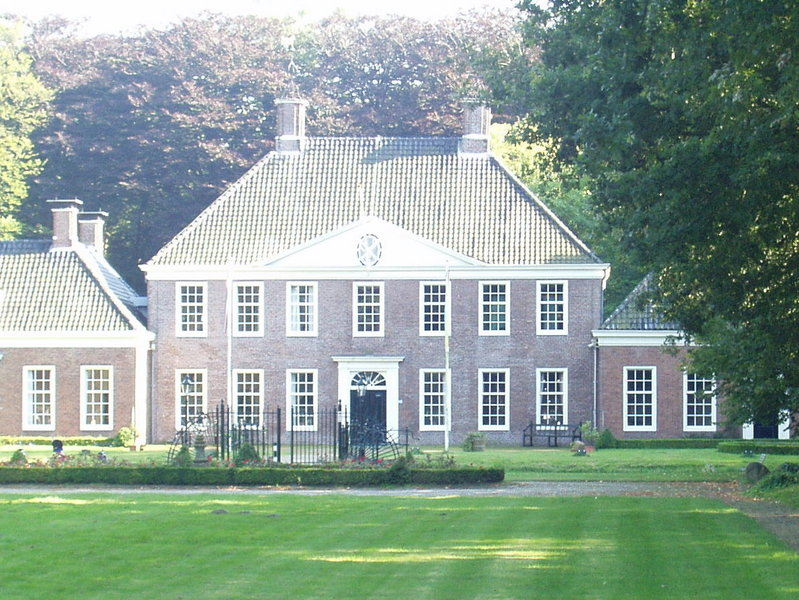
Laarwoud in Zuidlaren

Laarwoud is a monumental stronghold in the centre of Zuidlaren, the Netherlands. People also describe Laarwoud as a little castle, in the Netherlands locally known as havezate (Dutch). The word havezate is used in the Dutch provinces of Drenthe and Overijssel.

The building as seen on the picture dates from the beginning of the 17th century. However the founding of the building probably dates back from the Middle Ages. In the 17th century the stronghold was owned by the Van Selbach family. From 1953 until 2004 the building served as a town hall for the former municipality of Zuidlaren. After a redivision of municipalities in the Netherlands, the stronghold once again became a dwelling house. It is registered as a rijksmonument.
