= Zuidlaren =

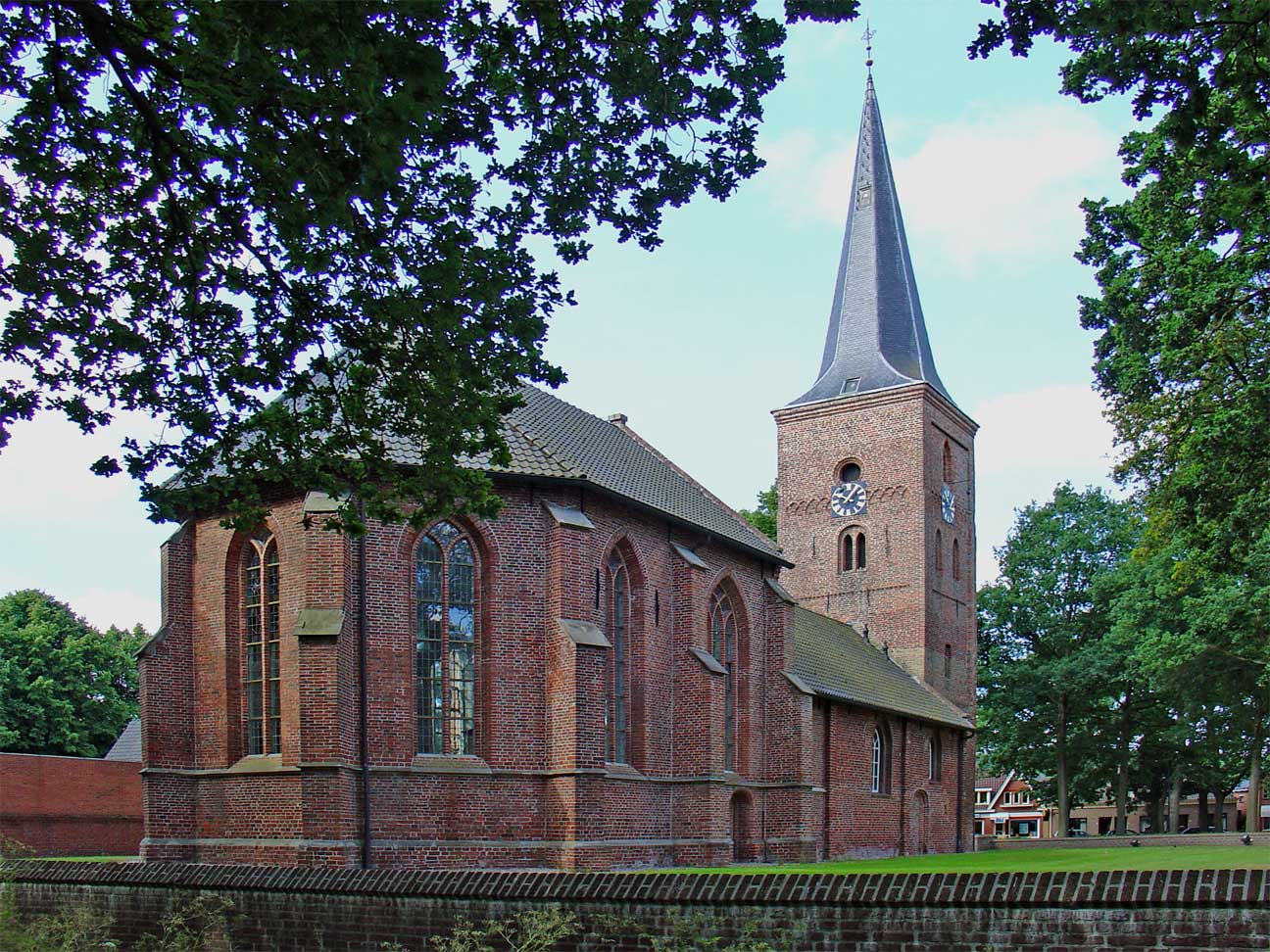
- The church of Zuidlaren

- Flag Coat of arms

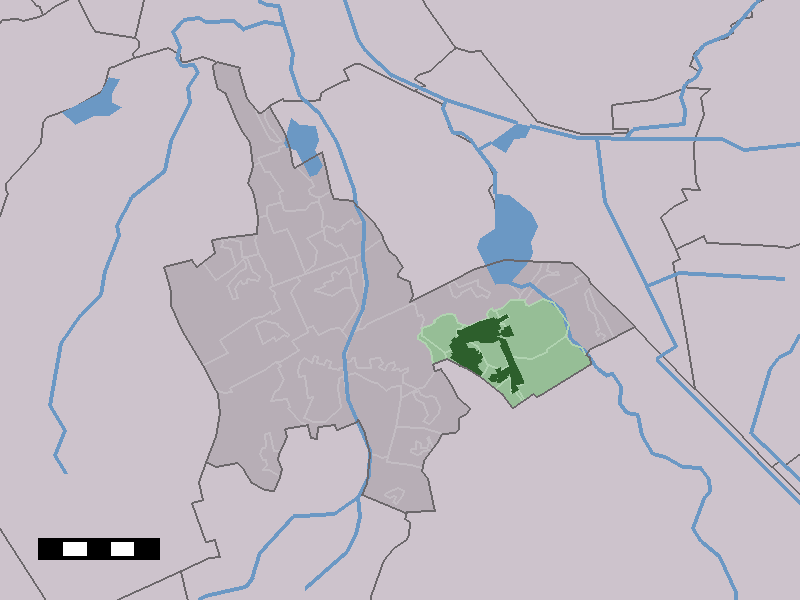
- Coordinates: 53°5′39″N 6°41′4″E
- Country: Netherlands
- Province: Drenthe
- Municipality: Tynaarlo

Population (31 December 2007)
  - Total: 10,080

Zuidlaren (Noordenvelds: Zuudlaoren) is a village in the province of Drenthe in the Northern Netherlands. Zuidlaren has just over 10,000 inhabitants and is situated on natural heightened land which is called the Hondsrug.

The village is part of the municipality of Tynaarlo. Formerly the village had its own municipality called Zuidlaren, but in 1998 Zuidlaren merged with Eelde and Vries. The new municipality was called "Zuidlaren" at first, but was renamed to Tynaarlo on 1 December 1999. Tynaarlo is the name of a much smaller village than Zuidlaren and is located between the 3 largest villages of the municipality: Eelde, Zuidlaren and Vries. The new town hall is located in Vries, which replaced the Laarwoud town hall in 2004.

== Sights of interest ==
A major industry in Zuidlaren is tourism, because of the varied cultural sights and attractions.

In the centre of the village are a few important statues. The statue of a horse and two horsetraders has once been revealed by Crown Prince Willem-Alexander of the Netherlands during the Zuidlaardermarkt.

There is also the statue of Berend Botje, which refers to Lodewijk van Heiden (1773–1850), a Dutch seafarer. In Zuidlaren Berend Botje is best known as a song for children to be learned in kindergarten.

Another statue is located in front of the Prins Bernhardhoeve (PBH), which is a large exhibition complex. The statue refers to the fire that destroyed a big part of the PBH in 1986, the statue is called 'Vriendschap Vereeuwigd' ('Friendship Immortalized'). It was named like that by R.C. Zuidlaren-Anloo, the local Rotary club, because the payment for the statue was donated by a Rotary club from Achim, Germany.

The memorial of World War II is located in front of the former town hall 'Laarwoud'. The annual commemoration of the inhabitants of Zuidlaren who died during World War II is always on 4 May, the day before Liberation Day. The commemoration is also to think of the people who suffer from wars today.

The windmill of Zuidlaren is called 'De Wachter', it is in the far east of the village. The mill specializes in corn and oil and has its own bakery and museum.

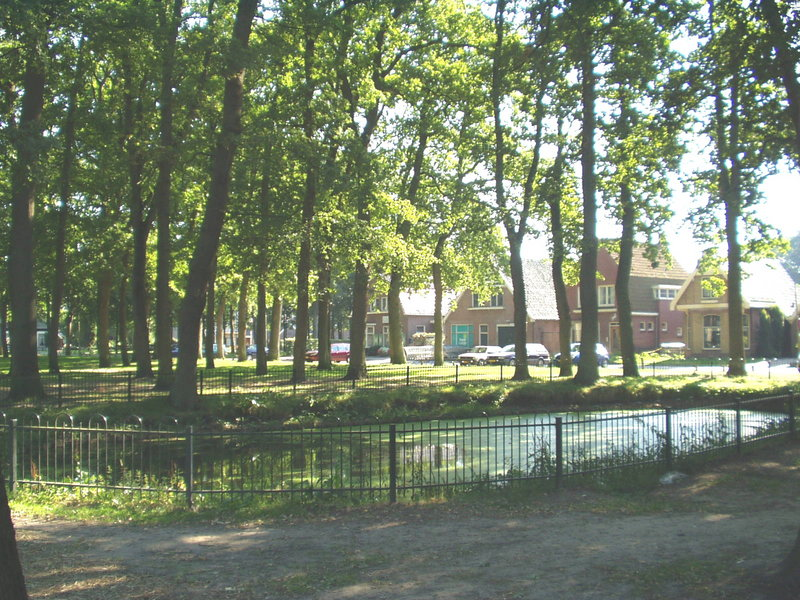
View on the largest village green of Zuidlaren.

Zuidlaren is also known for its many village greens (Dutch: brinken). Village greens in Zuidlaren are mostly small to sizeable grasslands with a stand of trees. The largest village green is in the centre of the village and is located next to a large square.

== Events ==
One of the most well known annual events in Zuidlaren is the Zuidlaardermarkt, an annual event with a large cattle market, a country market and a fair. There also are other markets, like the weekly small country market on Fridays and the 'Oud-Drentsche Markt' which is in summer season on Wednesdays. Another large event is NIC Zuidlaren, an international horse riding competition.

The events in the village are often organized by the 'Zuidlaarder Ondernemers Vereniging' (ZOV). The ZOV is an organization of volunteers and is sponsored by entrepreneurs of Zuidlaren.

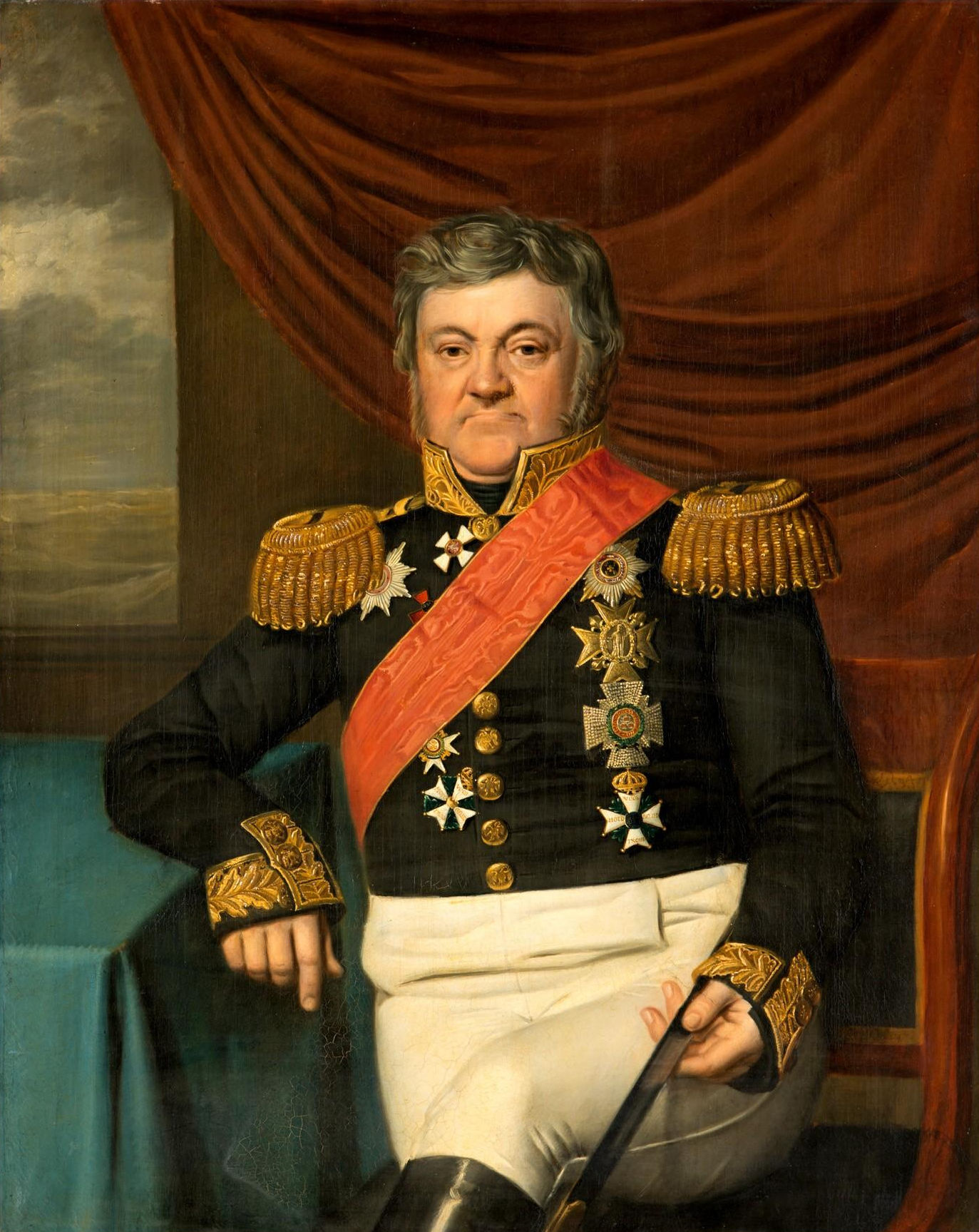
Lodewijk van Heiden, 1832

== Notable people ==
- Lodewijk van Heiden (1773–1850), a Dutch naval officer and Orangist, went into exile from the Batavian Republic
- Roelof Koops (1909–2008), a Dutch speed skater who competed in the 1936 Winter Olympics.
- Jan Welmers (1937–2022), a Dutch composer and organist.
- Maarten Kossmann (born 1966), a Dutch linguist who specializes in Berber languages at Leiden University
