= Joseph Tanke =

American philosopher (born 1978)

Joseph Tanke (Ph.D., Boston College; born 1978) is an American philosopher and Professor of Philosophy at the University of Hawaii at Manoa. His work focuses on Continental philosophy, the history of philosophy, aesthetics, art theory, and historical ontology. Tanke is known for his analysis of major figures in the French philosophical tradition, such as Michel Foucault and Jacques Rancière. His book Foucault's Philosophy of Art: A Genealogy of Modernity is one of the first systematic presentations of Michel Foucault's writings on visual art. Tanke is the first scholar to publish a comprehensive critical introduction to the thought of Jacques Rancière.

== Career ==
From 2007 to 2011, Tanke was the Chalsty Professor of Aesthetics and Philosophy at California College of the Arts in Oakland and San Francisco, California. In 2012, Tanke joined the Philosophy Department at the University of Hawaii at Manoa. During the fall semester of 2014, Tanke was the Critical Studies Fellow at the Cranbrook Academy of Art in Bloomfield Hills, Michigan.

Tanke is the editor of the series for Global Aesthetic Research, a book series at Rowman and Littlefield International dedicated to publishing new research in the field of aesthetics.

Tanke is also the past director of the International Cultural Studies Graduate Certificate Program (ICS) at the University of Hawaii at Manoa.

== Publications ==
Tanke is the author of Foucault's Philosophy of Art: A Genealogy of Modernity (Continuum International Publishing Group, 2009), Jacques Rancière: An Introduction—Philosophy, Politics, Aesthetics (Continuum International Publishing Group, 2011), and the editor (with Colin McQuillan) of the Bloomsbury Anthology of Aesthetics (Bloomsbury Publishing, 2012).
