= Flowers and Plants Association =

- Abbreviation: F&PA
- Formation: 1984
- Legal status: Nonprofit organization
- Purpose: Flowers and plants business in the UK
- Location: Mortlake, London
- Region served: United Kingdom
- Members: Flowers and plants companies
- Chief Executive: Andrea Caldecourt
- Website: www.flowers.org.uk

The Flowers and Plants Association is a UK organisation that supports the horticulture and floriculture business, usually associated with garden centres.

== History ==
It was formed in 1984. The UK flower and plant industry is worth around £2.2 billion.

== Function ==
Flowers and Plants Association helps to run the Hampton Court Palace Flower Show. It also promotes flower and garden businesses in United Kingdom.

== Structure ==
It is situated just south of the Thames and the A3003 in the London Borough of Richmond upon Thames, near Barnes Hospital.

== See also ==
- Alpine Garden Society
