= Jan Welmers =

Dutch composer and organist (1937–2022)

- Born: 6 July 1937; Zuidlaren, Netherlands
- Died: 7 March 2022 (aged 84); Bunnik, Netherlands
- Occupation(s): Composer and organist

Jan Welmers (6 July 1937 – 7 March 2022) was a Dutch composer and organist.

== Life and career ==
Born in Zuidlaren, the son of an organist and pianist and of an elementary school teacher, Welmers studied at the Prince Claus Conservatoire and at the Utrechts Conservatorium. He was author of a large number of organ compositions, mostly in minimalistic style, starting from 1961. He was professor of organ and music theory at the Utrechts Conservatorium from 1974 to 1998, and organist at the Saint Stephen's Church in Nijmegen from 1974 to 2002.

During his career Welmers was the recipient of several awards and honors, including the first prize at the 1968 International Organ Improvisation Competition and the Sweelinck Prize for his career in 2005. He died on 7 March 2022, at the age of 84.
