= RAI Amsterdam =

Dutch complex of halls

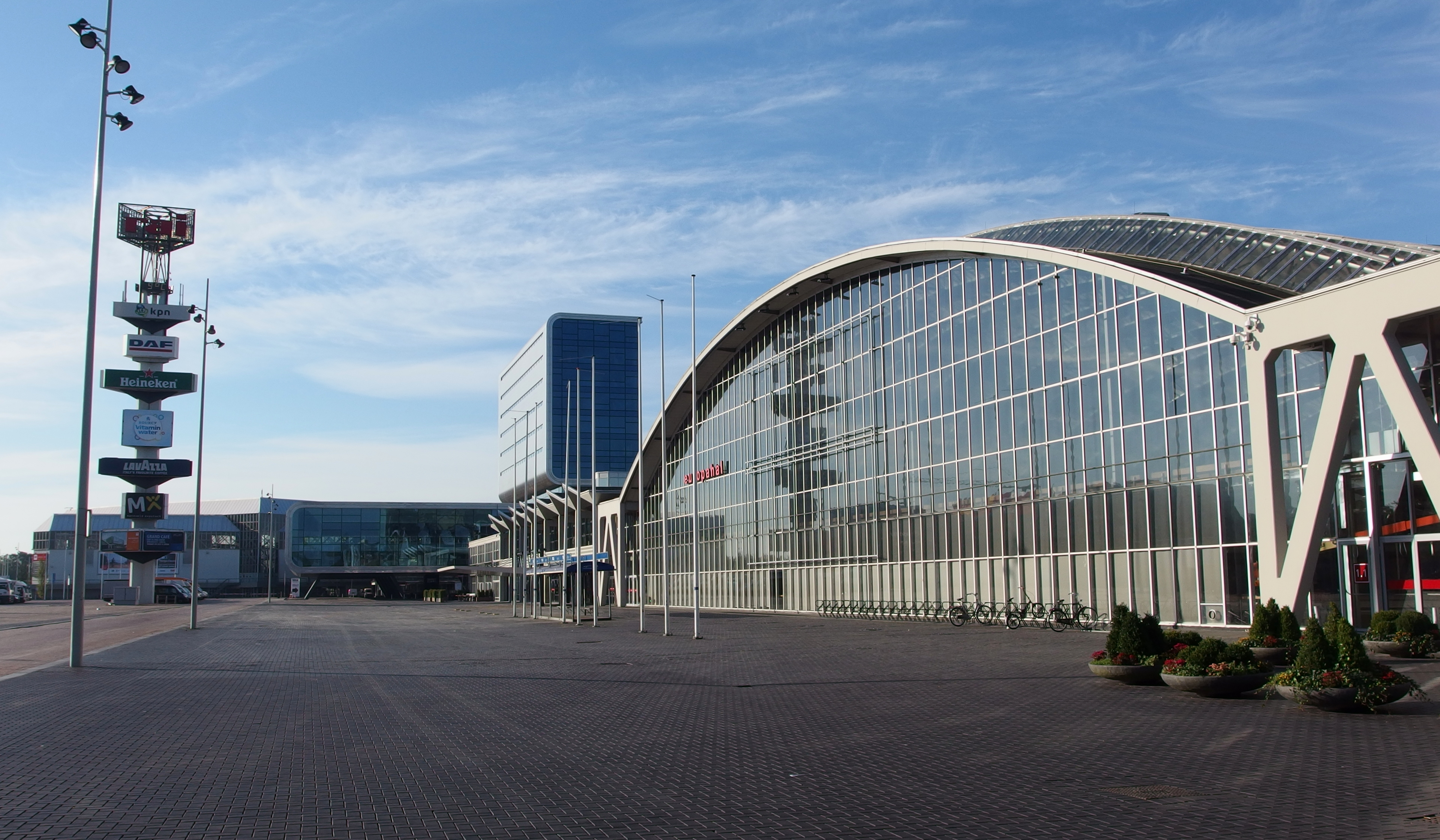
- RAI Amsterdam in 2015
- Interactive map of RAI Amsterdam
- Former names: Amsterdam RAI Exhibition and Convention Centre
- Location: Zuidas, Amsterdam, Netherlands
- Coordinates: 52°20′29″N 4°53′18″E
- Owner: RAI Vereniging; Municipality of Amsterdam
- Public transit: Train: Amsterdam RAI; Metro: RAI, Europaplein

Construction
- Opened: 2 February 1961; 65 years ago
- Renovated: 2007–2009, 2018
- Expanded: 1963, 1965, 2009, 2015
- Architect: Alexander Bodon

Website
- www.rai.nl

RAI Amsterdam (Dutch pronunciation: [raːi], acronym for Rijwiel en Automobiel Industrie), is a complex of conference and exhibition halls in the Zuidas business district of Amsterdam, Netherlands.

Opened in 1961, the RAI welcomed its 75 millionth visitor in February 2001. Up to 2 million people visit the RAI every year. Some 50 international conferences and 70 trade shows are held at the RAI annually. The complex consists of 22 conference rooms and 11 multi-functional halls and has a total floor space of 112,200 m^{2}. The largest and oldest hall, Europahal RAI, has capacity for 12,900 people. The complex also includes a musical and concert theatre and underground parking space for over 4,000 cars. The convention centre gives its name to the nearby Amsterdam RAI railway station.

== History ==
The origins of the RAI complex can be traced back to 1893, when the trade association RI (Rijwiel-Industrie, Dutch for "Bicycle Industry") was founded by several bicycle manufacturers. The first bicycle trade show of the RI was held in 1895 at the Paleis voor Volksvlijt ("Palace of Industry") building in Amsterdam. In 1900, the RI changed its name to RAI (Rijwiel en Automobiel Industrie) because many of its members had started manufacturing automobiles in addition to bicycles.

In 1922, the RAI occupied an exhibition hall of its own on the Ferdinand Bolstraat in Amsterdam. This building, the "old RAI", was demolished in 1975 and replaced by the current building complex on Europaplein square, which was opened by Prince Bernhard of the Netherlands on February 2, 1961. Vesthallen was completed in 1963, and a separate conference center followed in 1965. Since then, the center has continued to grow with several new halls and meeting rooms.

The RAI completed the construction of a 47 metres tall expansion named Elicium in 2009, serving as Europe’s largest conference center. A multi-purpose building, Amtrium, opened in 2015, and an underground car park followed in 2016. In January 2020, the center's first hotel was opened.

Europahal RAI was declared a rijksmonument in 2015 together with the advertising pillar in front of it. The RAI trade association still owns 75% of the complex, with the remainder in the hands of the municipality of Amsterdam.

== Events ==
Trade shows and other events held annually at the RAI include:

- KunstRAI, an art fair
- AutoRAI, an automobile trade show (until 2015)
- HISWA, a boating and watersports trade show
- Horecava, a trade fair for the hospitality industry
- Horti Fair, a trade show for the horticultural industry
- International Broadcasting Convention, an annual trade show for broadcasters
- Jumping Amsterdam, an equestrian sporting event

In addition, the 1969 Grand Gala du Disque and 1970 Eurovision Song Contest were held at the RAI.

== In media ==
Parts of the film Trafic (1971) by Jacques Tati were shot at the RAI during the 1970 car show.

== Gallery ==
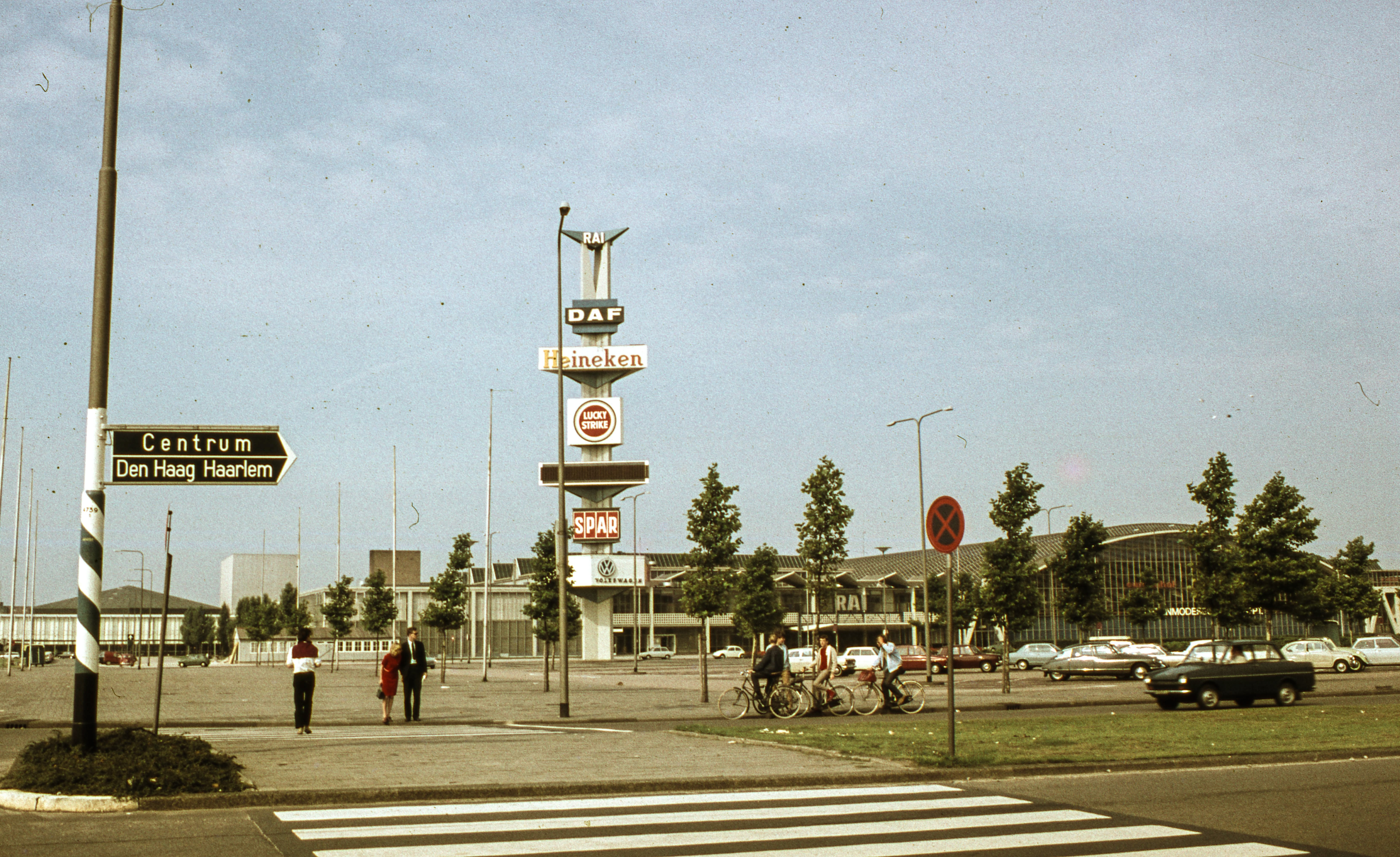
The convention centre in the 1970s

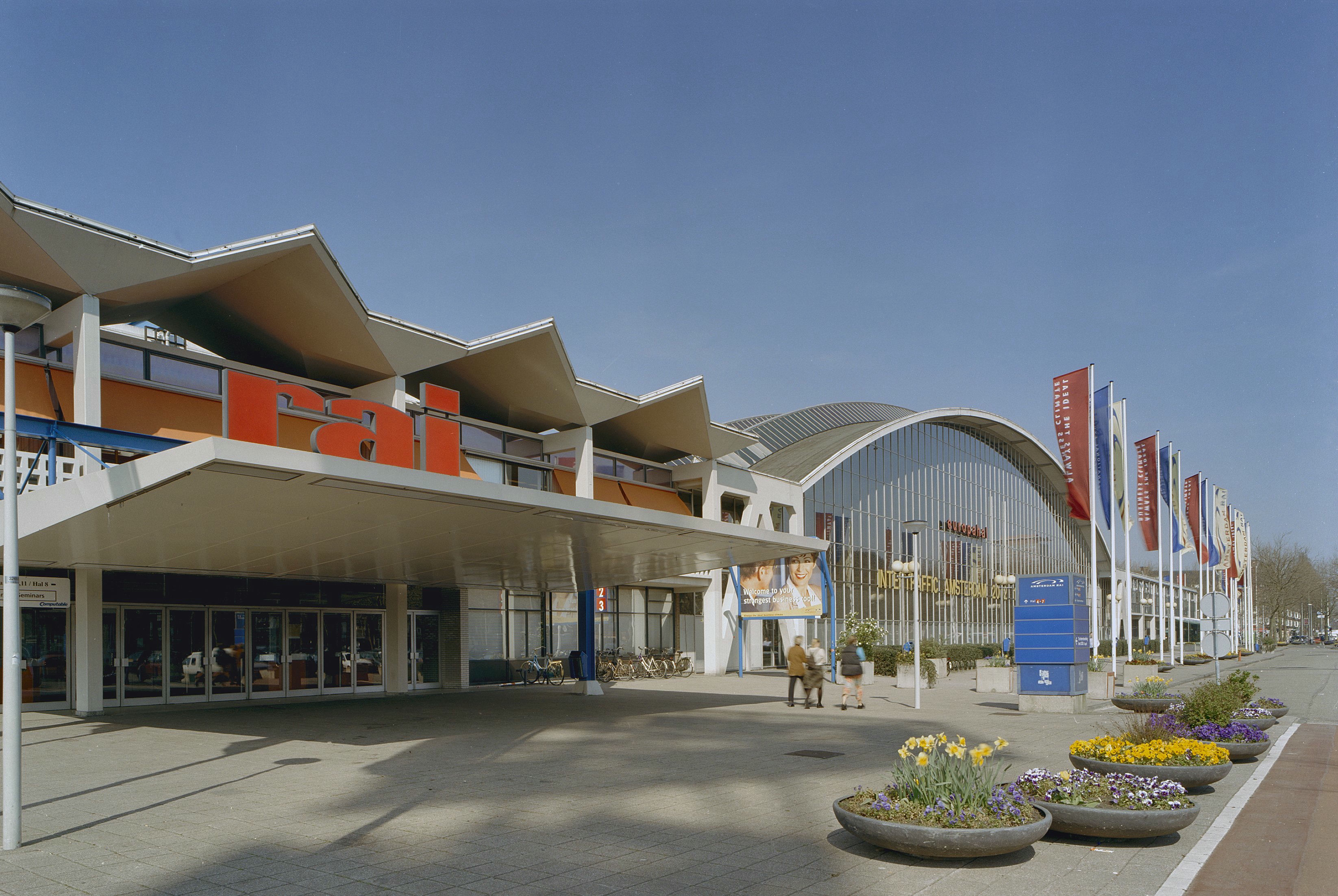
Europahal RAI in April 2002

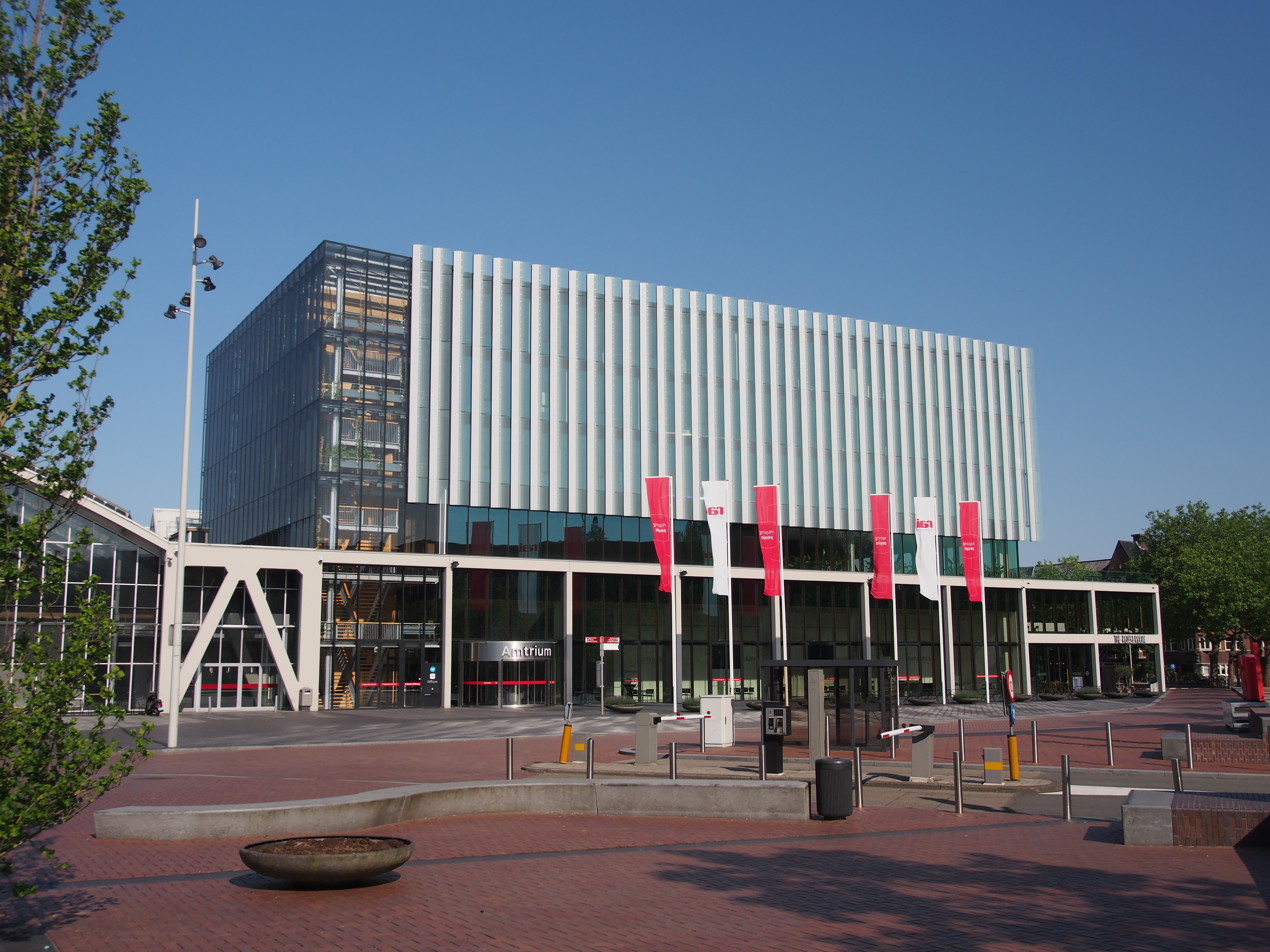
The Amtrium building in June 2016

== See also ==
- List of convention centres in the Netherlands

Preceded by Teatro Real; Madrid	Eurovision Song Contest; Venue; 1970	Succeeded by Gaiety Theatre; Dublin
