= Jaarbeurs =

Exhibition and convention center in Utrecht, Netherlands

Coordinates: 52.0850°N 5.1050°E

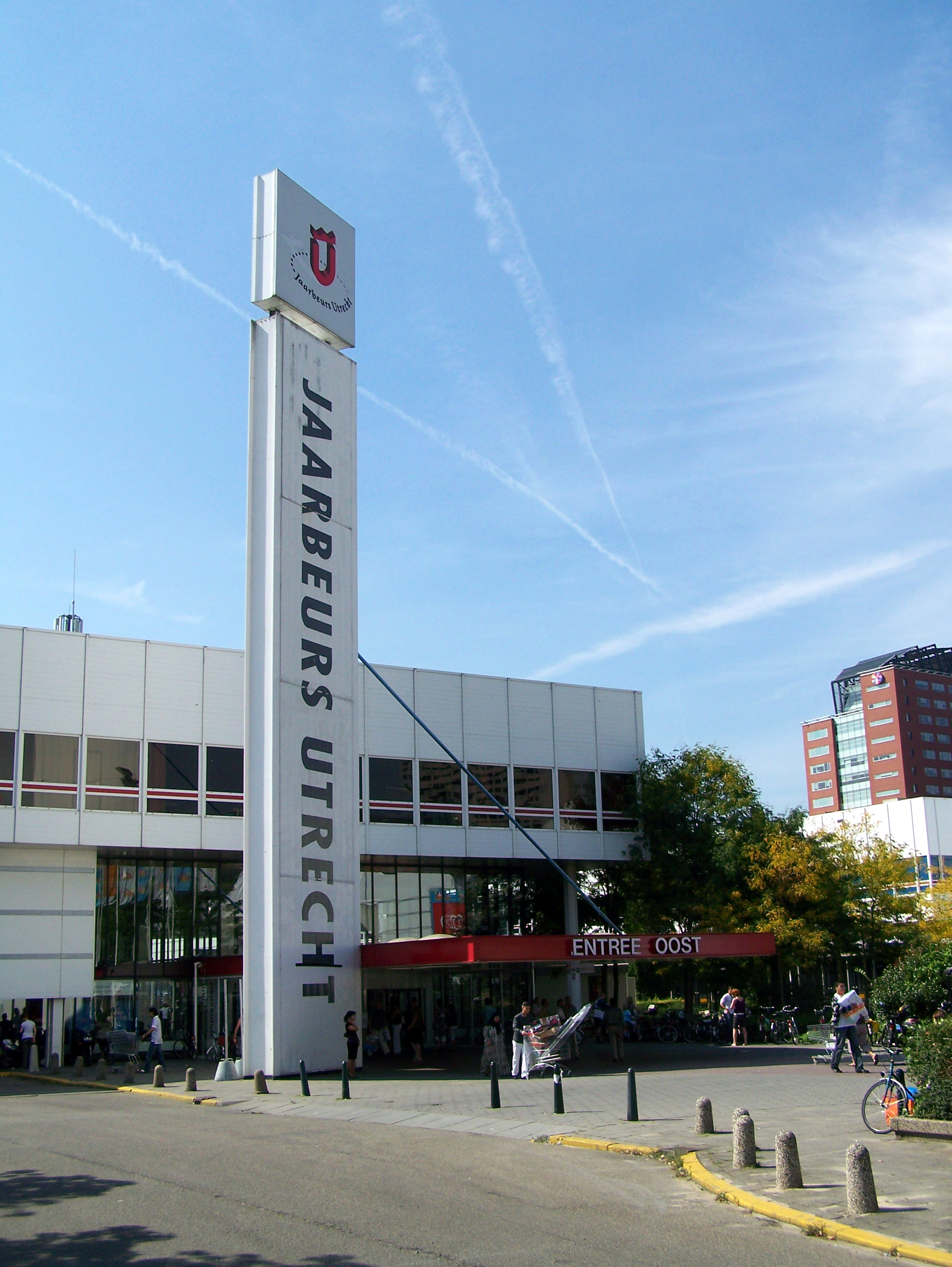
- Jaarbeurs entrance
- Interactive map of Jaarbeurs

Website
- jaarbeurs.nl

The Jaarbeurs (pronounced [ˈjaːrbøːrs]; Dutch for 'Yearly Fair') is an exhibition and convention centre located in the Beurskwartier district of Utrecht, in the Netherlands.

== Events ==
Noted events which have taken place at Jaarbeurs include the former Space '86, the Hobby Computer Club Days (HCC Dagen), and the Mega Record and CD Fair. The venue used to be also a regular base for music festivals like ASOT festival and Thunderdome.

The Jaarbeurs extends to an area of 100.000 m^{2} close to Utrecht Centraal railway station.

The first Jaarbeurs was held in 1997. It was a major success from the start, opening up the city of Utrecht as a trade centre and giving it an economic boost.

== See also ==
- Jaarbeurs Utrecht Marathon
- List of convention centres in the Netherlands
