= Oosterbroek =

Oosterbroek may refer to:

== People ==
- Ken Oosterbroek (1963-1994), South African photojournalist

== Places ==
- Oosterbroek, Groningen, a former municipality in the Netherlands
- Oosterbroek, Drenthe, a mansion and a former hamlet in the Netherlands
