= Oosterbroek, Drenthe =

Oosterbroek
- Hamlet
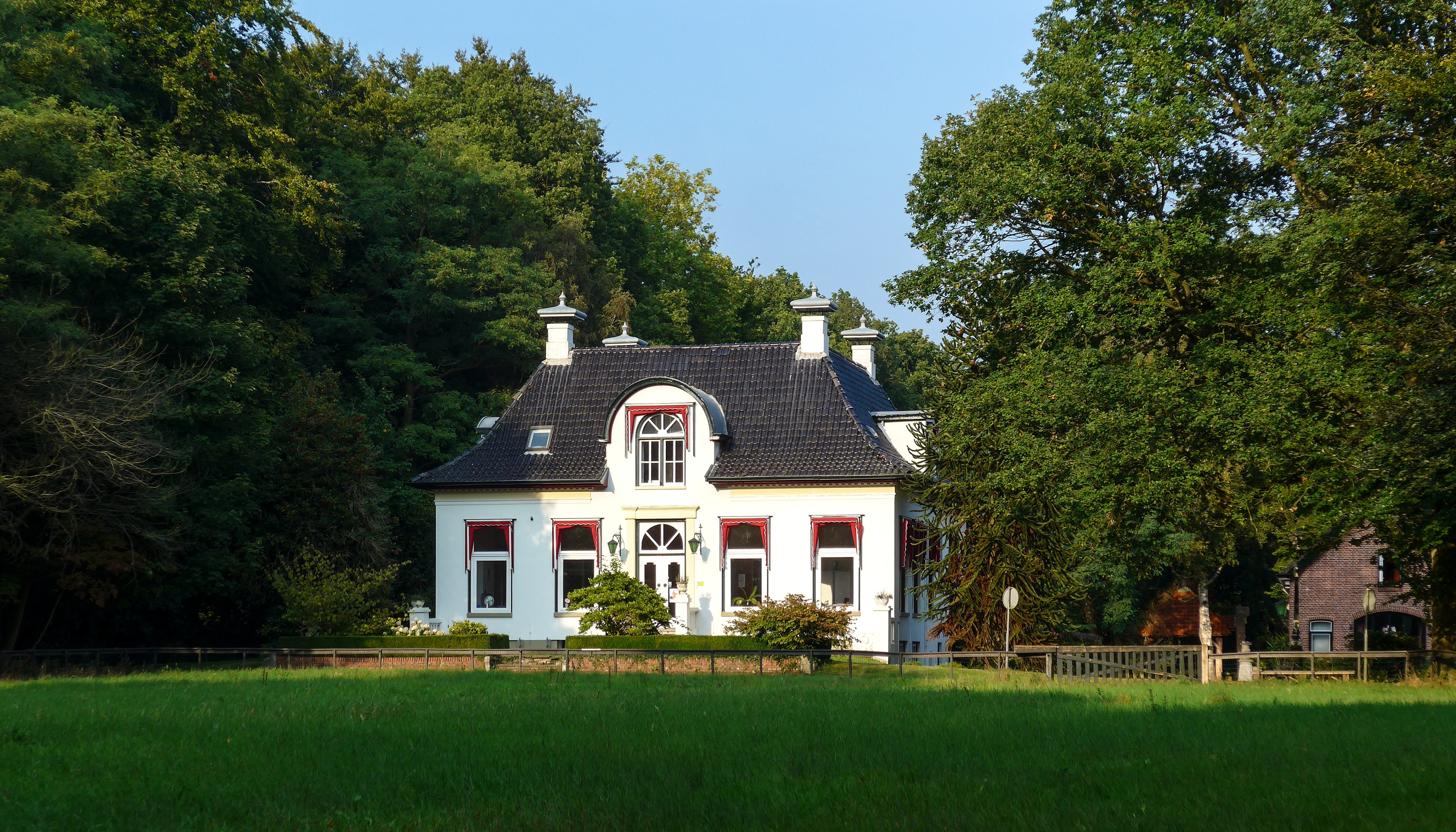
- Havezate Oosterbroek

- Location in province of Drenthe in the Netherlands Oosterbroek (Netherlands)
- Coordinates: 53.1314°N 6.5928°E
- Country: Netherlands
- Province: Drenthe
- Municipality: Tynaarlo

Area
  - Total: 1.77 km^{2} (0.68 sq mi)
- Elevation: 3 m (9.8 ft)

Population (2021)
  - Total: 165
  - Density: 93.2/km^{2} (241/sq mi)
- Time zone: UTC+1 (CET)
  - Summer (DST): UTC+2 (CEST)
- Postal code: 9761
- Dialing code: 050

Oosterbroek is a mansion and a former hamlet in the Dutch province of Drenthe. The mansion is located about 2 km east of Eelde, in the municipality of Tynaarlo.

The hamlet was located around the mansion. The mansion was a havezate which was a requirement to be admitted to the Knights of Drenthe. Around 1850, it had 3 houses and about 25 inhabitants. It was still considered to be a separate settlement in 1997, but the name no longer appears on the newest topographical maps. As of 2021, it is a statistical entity with Groningen Airport Eelde, however the postal authorities have put it under Eelde.

== Gallery ==
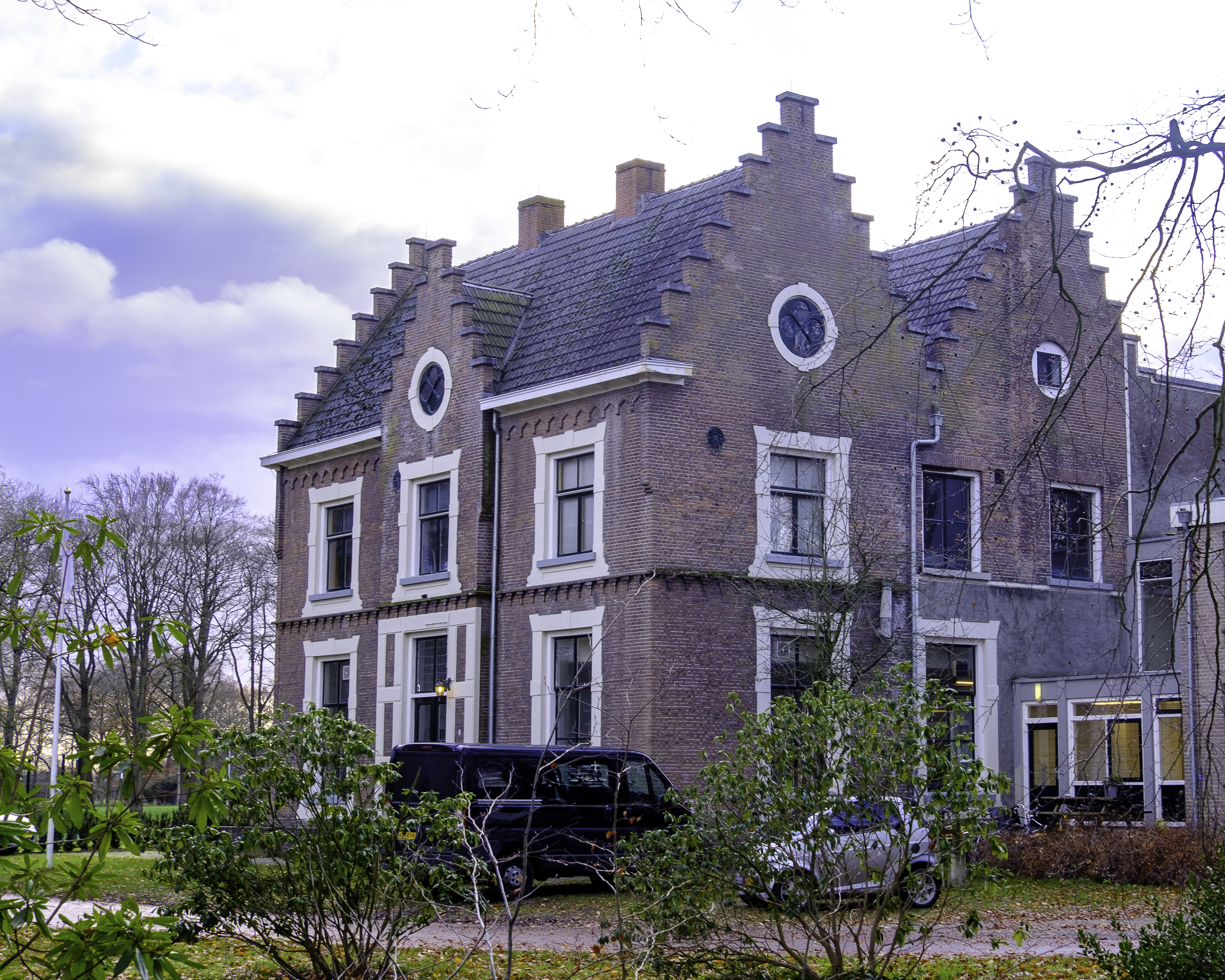
Mansion Hoog Hullen

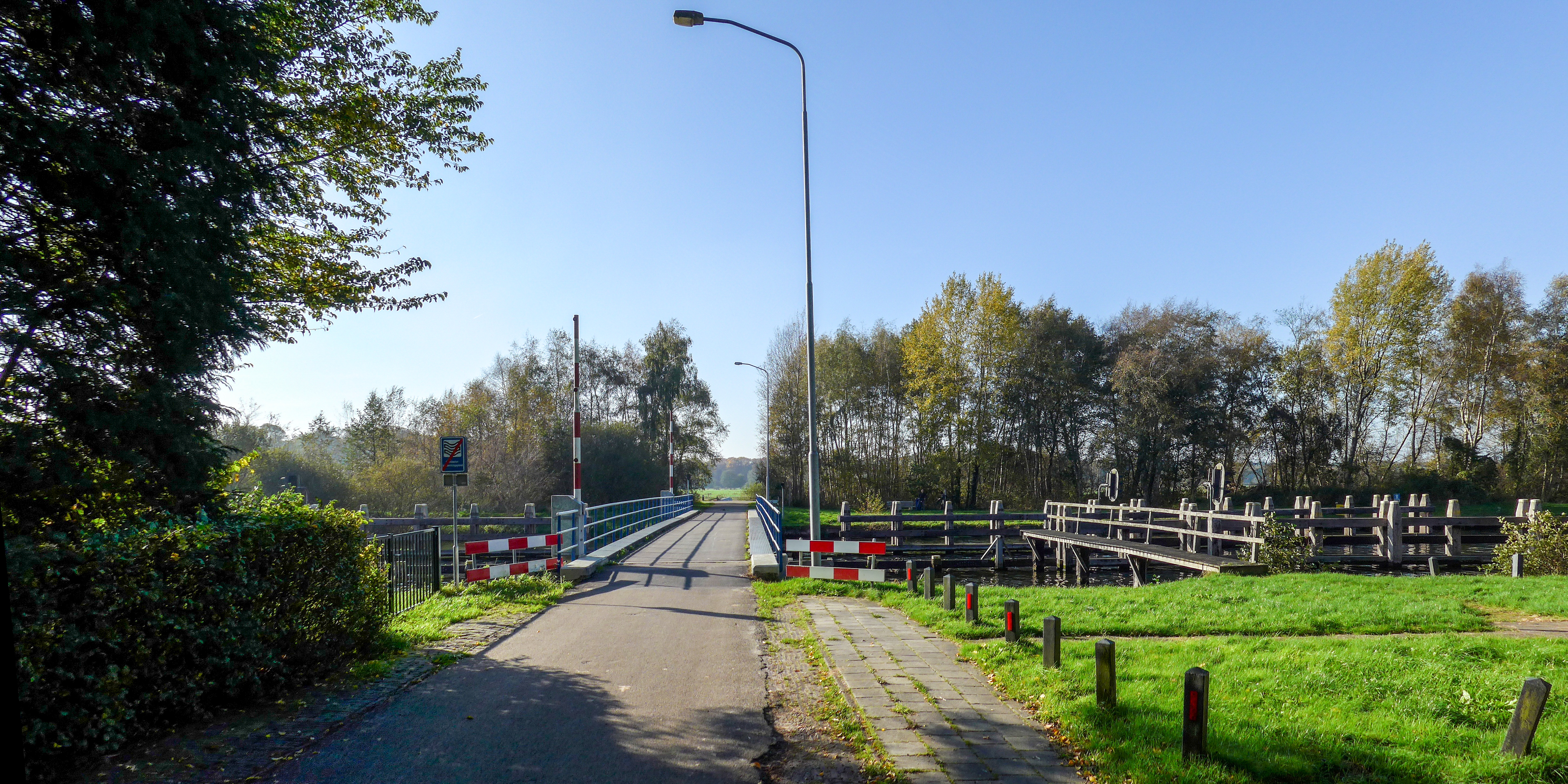
Bridge over the canal

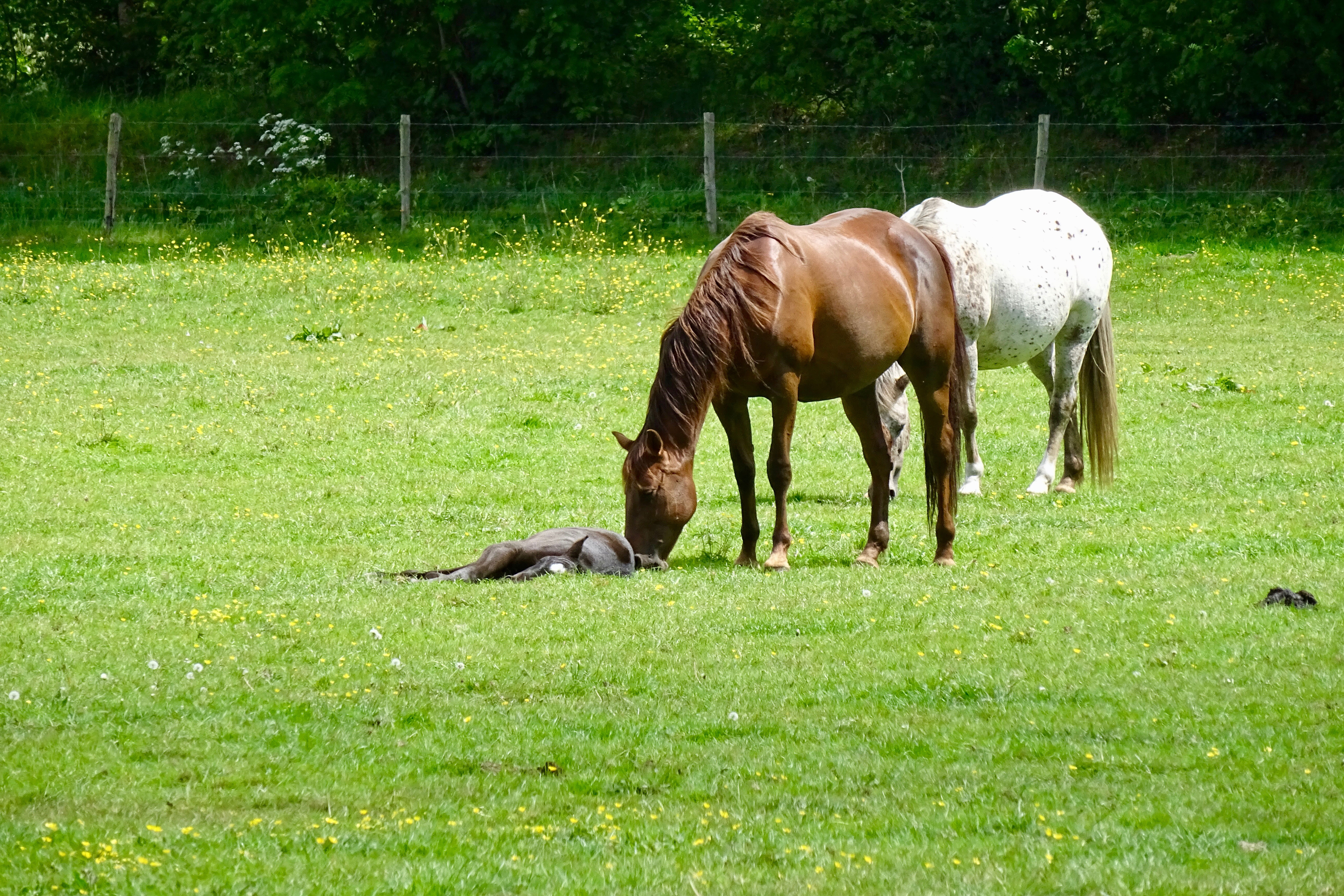
Horses near Oosterbroek
