= Eelderwolde =

- Village
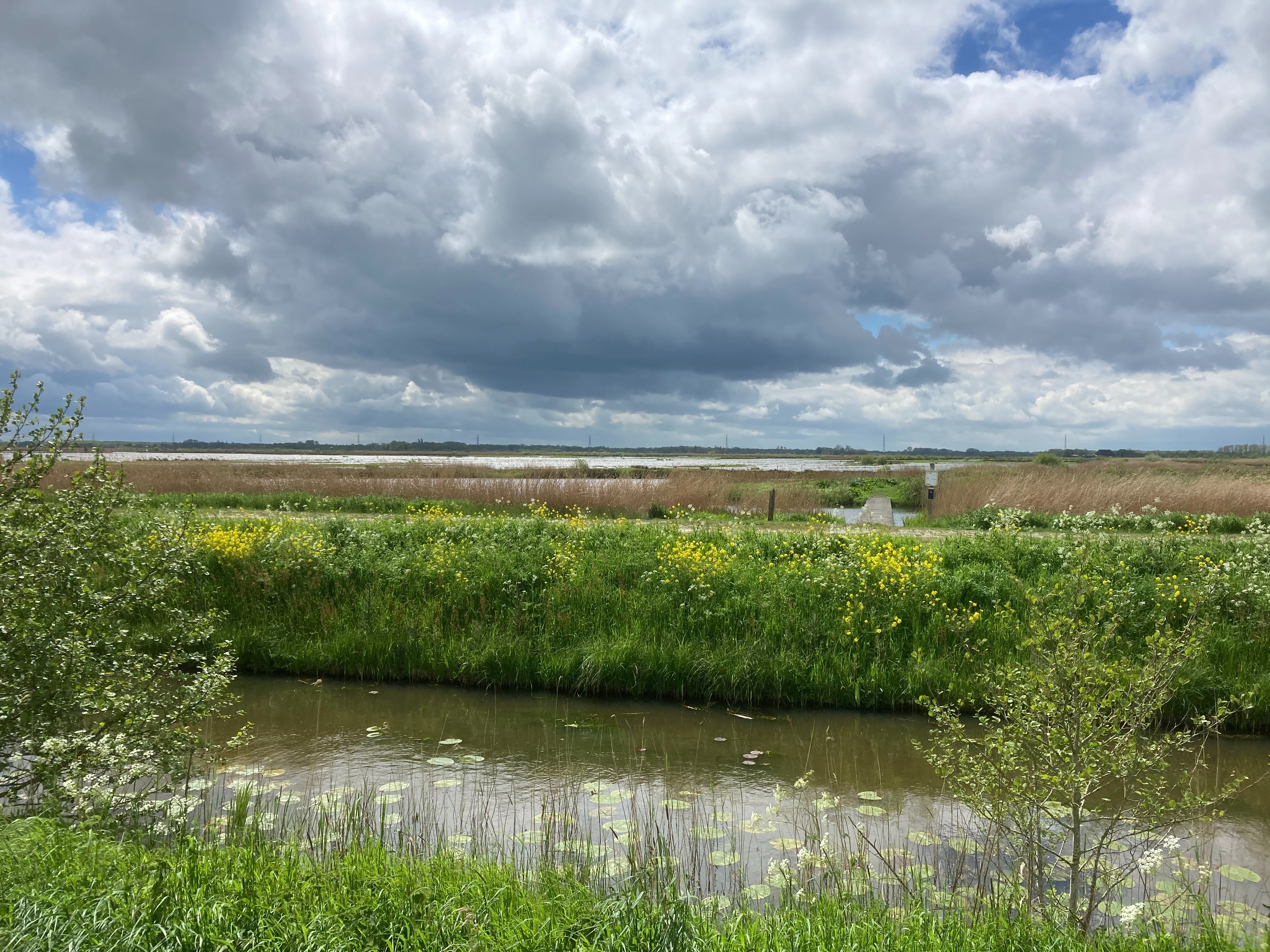
- Landscape near Eelderwolde

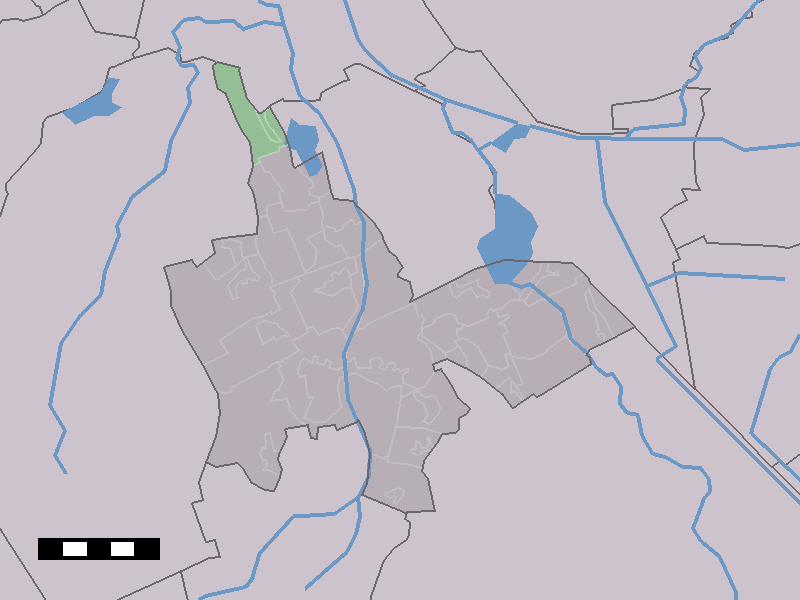
- Eelderwolde in the municipality of Tynaarlo.

- Location in the province of Drenthe Eelderwolde (Netherlands)
- Coordinates: 53°11′N 6°33′E
- Country: Netherlands
- Province: Drenthe
- Municipality: Tynaarlo, Groningen

Area
  - Total: 4.98 km^{2} (1.92 sq mi)
- Elevation: 0.0 m (0 ft)

Population (2021)
  - Total: 2,970
  - Density: 596/km^{2} (1,540/sq mi)
- Time zone: UTC+1 (CET)
  - Summer (DST): UTC+2 (CEST)
- Postal code: 9766
- Dialing code: 050

Eelderwolde is a village in the Dutch province of Drenthe. It is a part of the municipality of Tynaarlo, and lies about 5 km south of Groningen.

== History ==
The village was first mentioned in 1442 as "to Eelderwolde", and means "woods of Eelde".

Eelderwolde was home to 34 people in 1840. In 1973, a recreation area is developed near Eelderwolde. It was expanded in 1983, and in 1987, a Scandinavian village with sauna was added. Since 2006, the neighbourhood Ter Borch is being developed with will ultimately consists of 1,250 houses.
