= Zeegse =

- Village
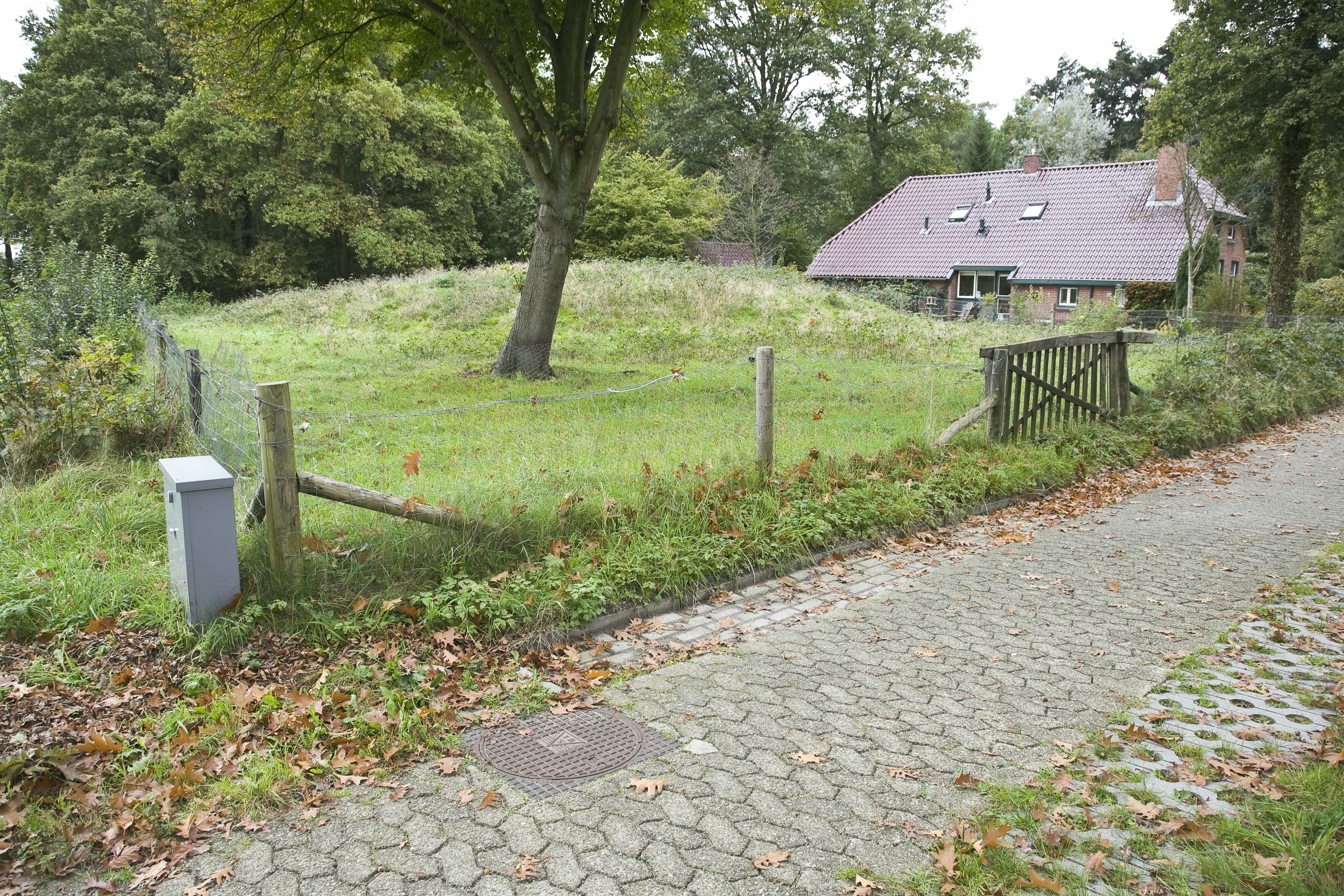
- Burial hill and farm in Zeegse

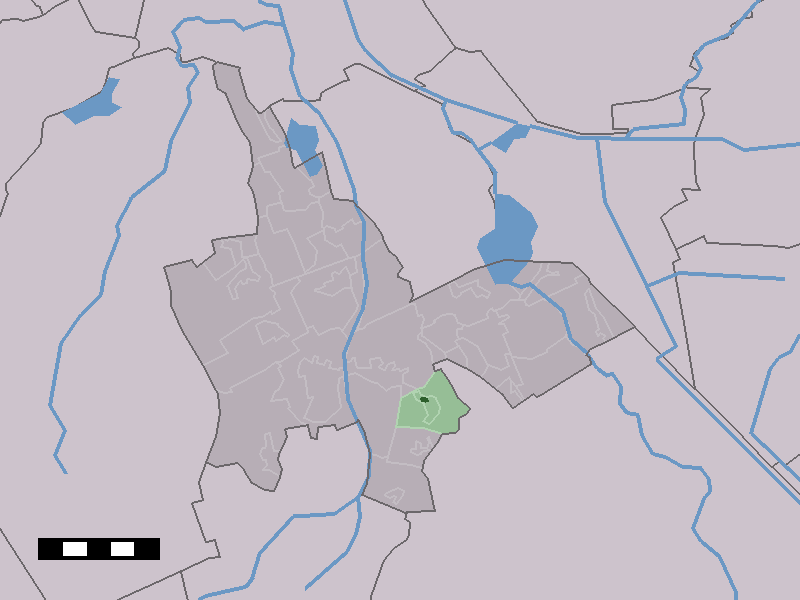
- The village centre (dark green) and the statistical district (light green) of Zeegse in the municipality of Tynaarlo.

- Location in the Netherlands Zeegse (Netherlands)
- Coordinates: 53°4′N 6°39′E
- Country: Netherlands
- Province: Drenthe
- Municipality: Tynaarlo

Area
  - Total: 5.15 km^{2} (1.99 sq mi)
- Elevation: 8 m (26 ft)

Population (2021)
  - Total: 405
  - Density: 78.6/km^{2} (204/sq mi)
- Time zone: UTC+1 (CET)
  - Summer (DST): UTC+2 (CEST)
- Postal code: 9483
- Dialing code: 0592

Zeegse is a village in the Dutch province of Drenthe. It is a part of the municipality of Tynaarlo, and lies about 9 km northeast of Assen.

The village was first mentioned in 1225 as Otto de Segese. The etymology is unclear. Zeegse was home to 51 people in 1840.
