= Bunne =

- Village
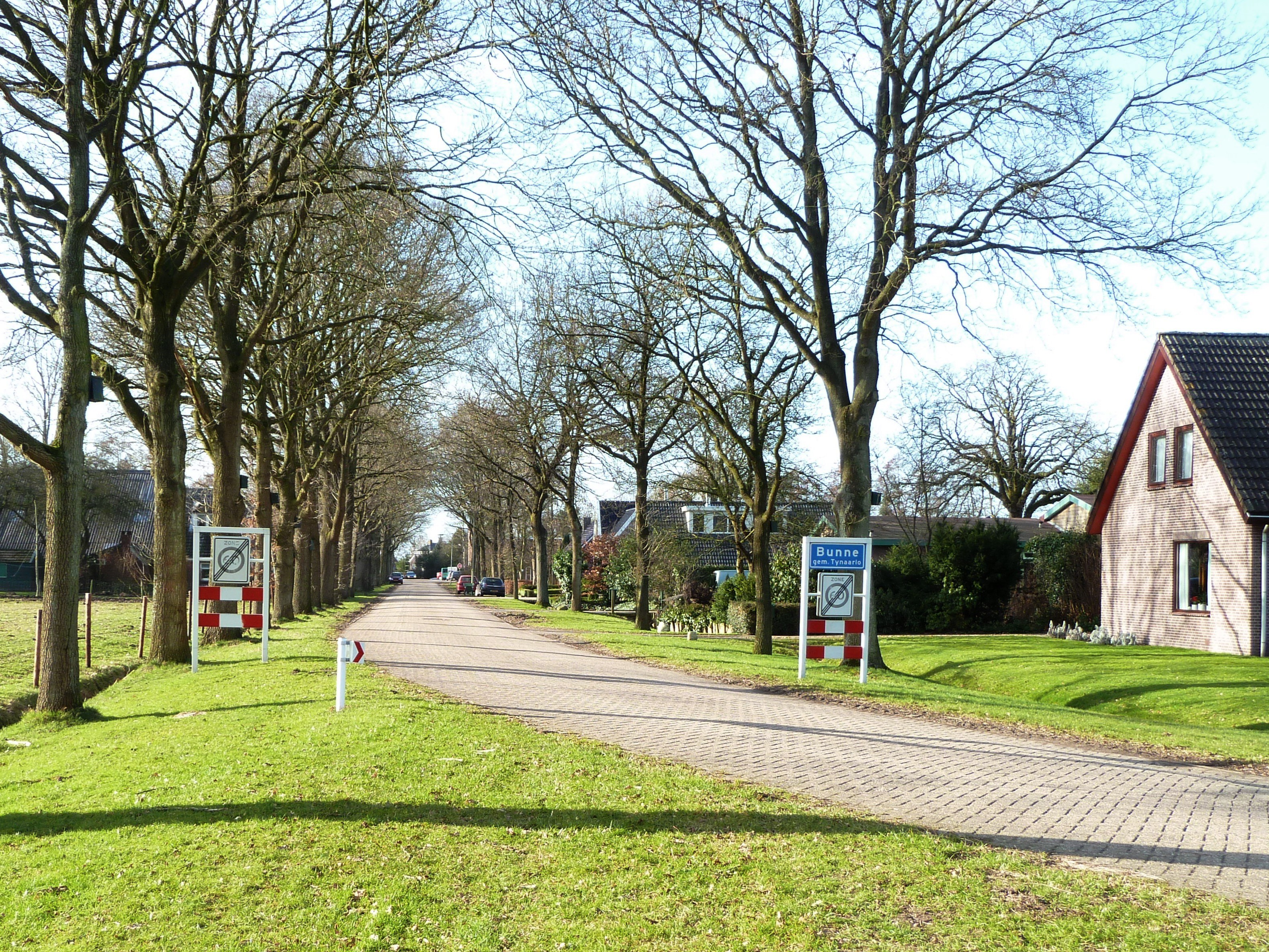
- Entrance to Bunne from the Eelderweg. (2011)

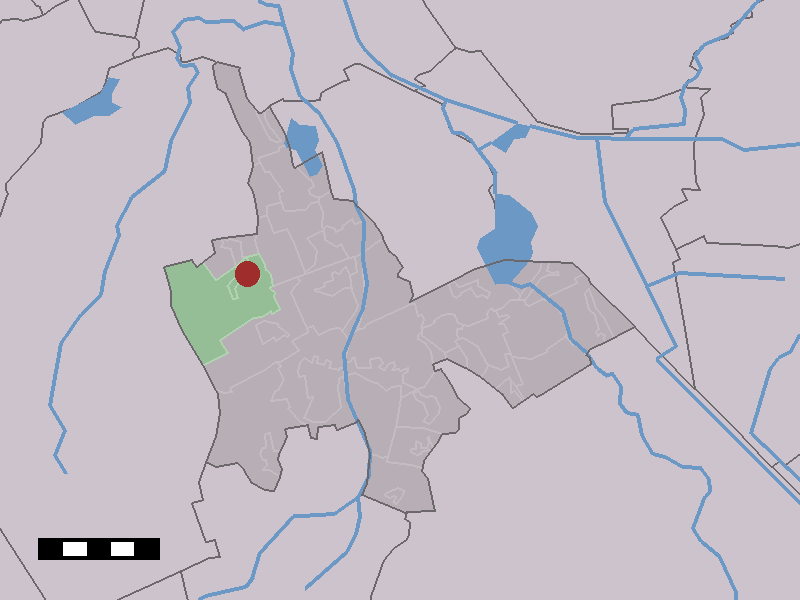
- The village (dark red) and the statistical district (light green) of Bunne in the municipality of Tynaarlo.

- Location in the Netherlands Bunne (Netherlands)
- Coordinates: 53°7′3″N 6°31′59″E
- Country: Netherlands
- Province: Drenthe
- Municipality: Tynaarlo

Area
  - Total: 12.93 km^{2} (4.99 sq mi)
- Elevation: 5 m (16 ft)

Population (2021)
  - Total: 235
  - Density: 18.2/km^{2} (47.1/sq mi)
- Time zone: UTC+1 (CET)
  - Summer (DST): UTC+2 (CEST)
- Postal code: 9496
- Dialing code: 0591

Bunne is a village in the Dutch province of Drenthe. It is a part of the municipality of Tynaarlo, and lies about 11 km south of Groningen.

== History ==
The village was first mentioned in 1206 or 1207 as Bonne. It could either mean "settlement of Bunne (person) or "settlement on a height". Bunne developed as an esdorp. There used to be a small nun monastery in the village called "Het Huys van Bunne".

Bunne was home to 110 people in 1840. In 1896, a cooperative dairy factory opened in the village. It closed in 1968, and was converted into a metal construction company in 1971. The chimney was demolished in 1980.

== Notable people ==
- Jan Aling (1949-2020), racing cyclist

== Gallery ==
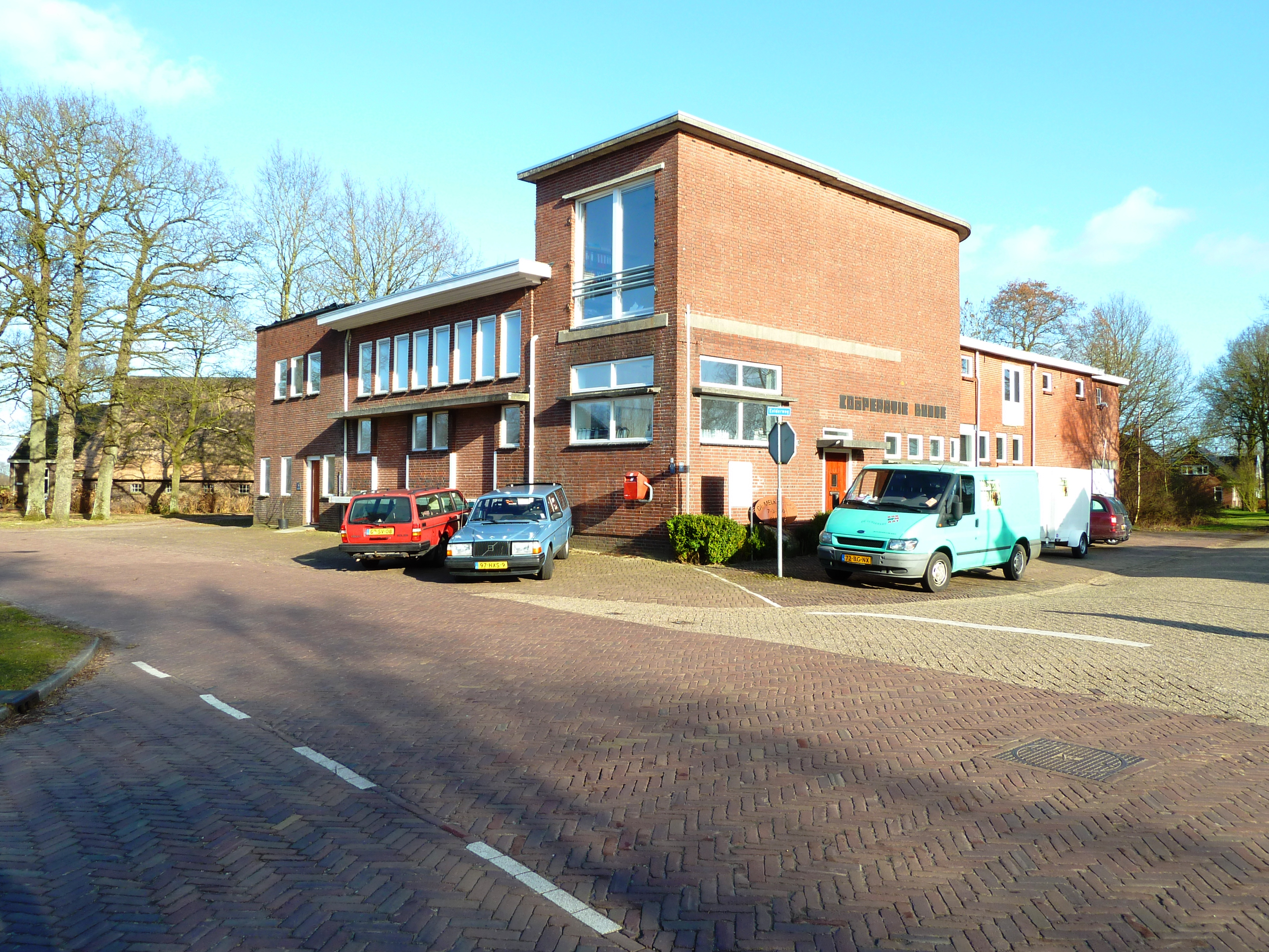
Dairy factory

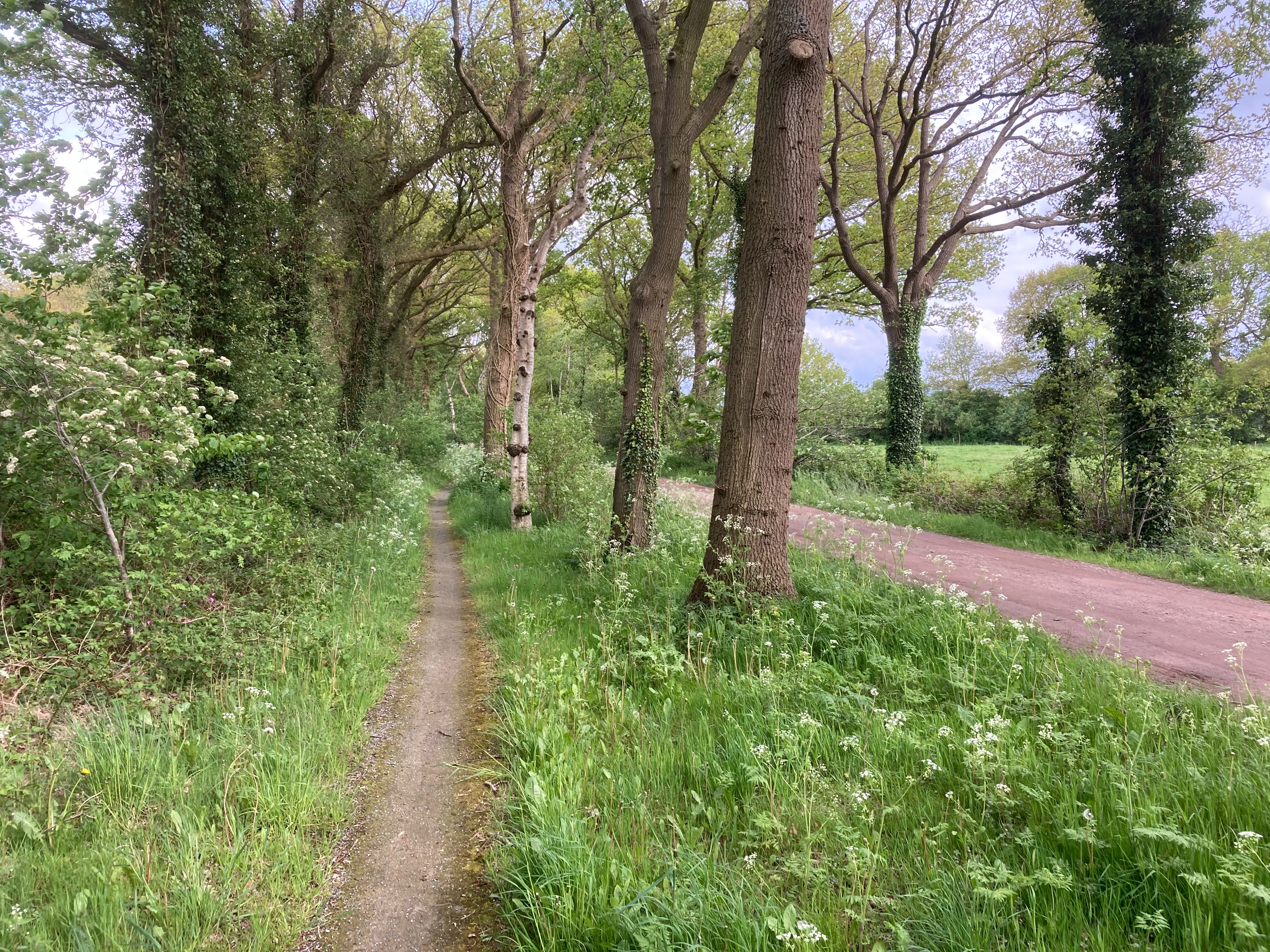
Back road in Bunne
