= Vries, Netherlands =

Vries
- Village
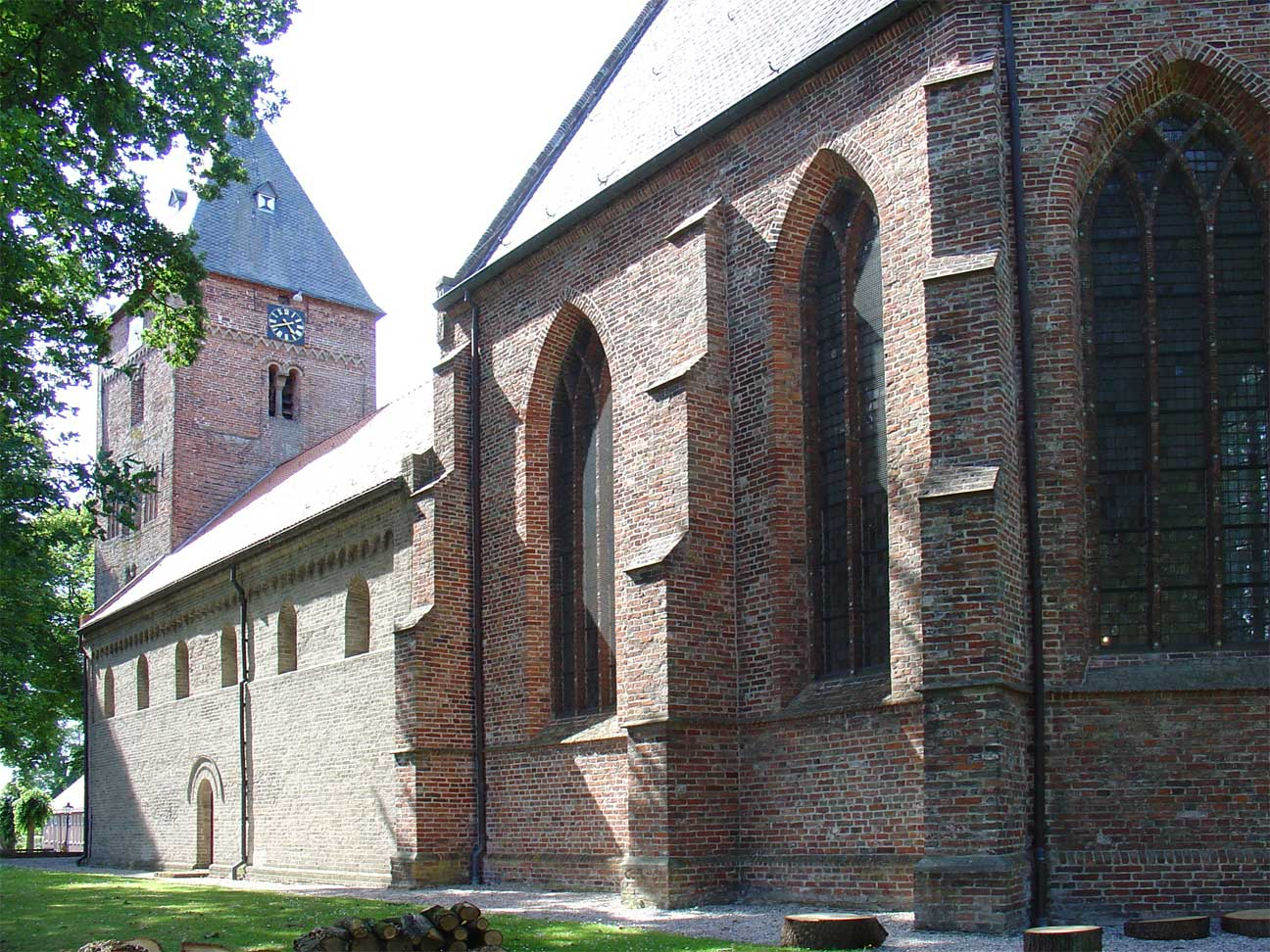
- Romaanse Sint-Bonifatiuskerk van Vries

- Flag Coat of arms

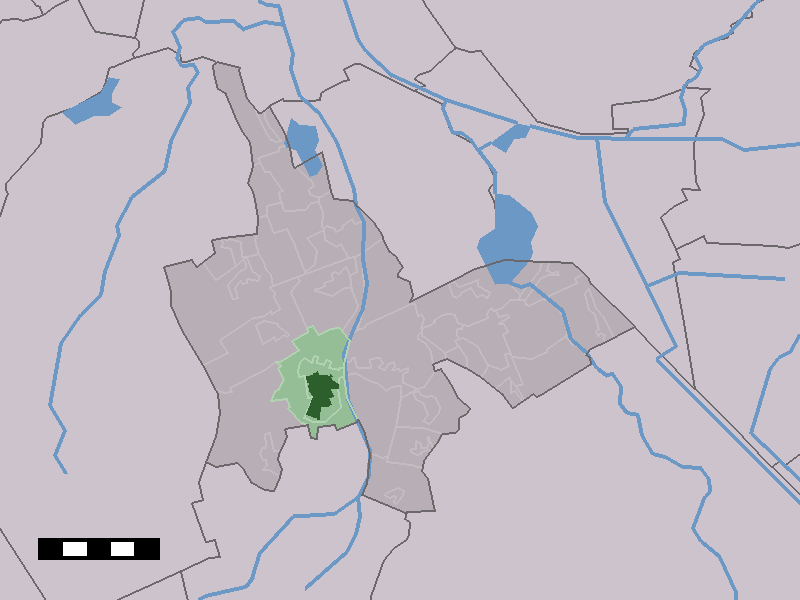
- The village centre (dark green) and the statistical district (light green) of Vries in the municipality of Tynaarlo.

- Location in the province of Drenthe Vries (Netherlands)
- Coordinates: 53°4′24″N 6°34′37″E
- Country: Netherlands
- Province: Drenthe
- Municipality: Tynaarlo

Area
  - Total: 10.40 km^{2} (4.02 sq mi)
- Elevation: 7 m (23 ft)

Population (2021)
  - Total: 4,045
  - Density: 388.9/km^{2} (1,007/sq mi)
- Time zone: UTC+1 (CET)
  - Summer (DST): UTC+2 (CEST)
- Postal code: 9481
- Dialing code: 0592

Vries is a village in the Dutch province of Drenthe. It is a part of the municipality of Tynaarlo, and lies about 8 km north of Assen.

Vries was a separate municipality until 1998, when it was merged with Eelde and Zuidlaren into a new municipality called Tynaarlo.

== History ==
The village was first mentioned in 1139 as Vrees. The etymology is unclear. Vries is an esdorp which developed in the Early Middle Ages. The old village structure is still visible.

The Dutch Reformed church dates from the 12th century. It was extended around 1425. The church contains two sarcophagi. (disputed by the Wikipedia page about Roden)

Vries was home to 415 people in 1840. Vries used to be independent municipality. In 1998, it was merged into Tynaarlo.

== Gallery ==
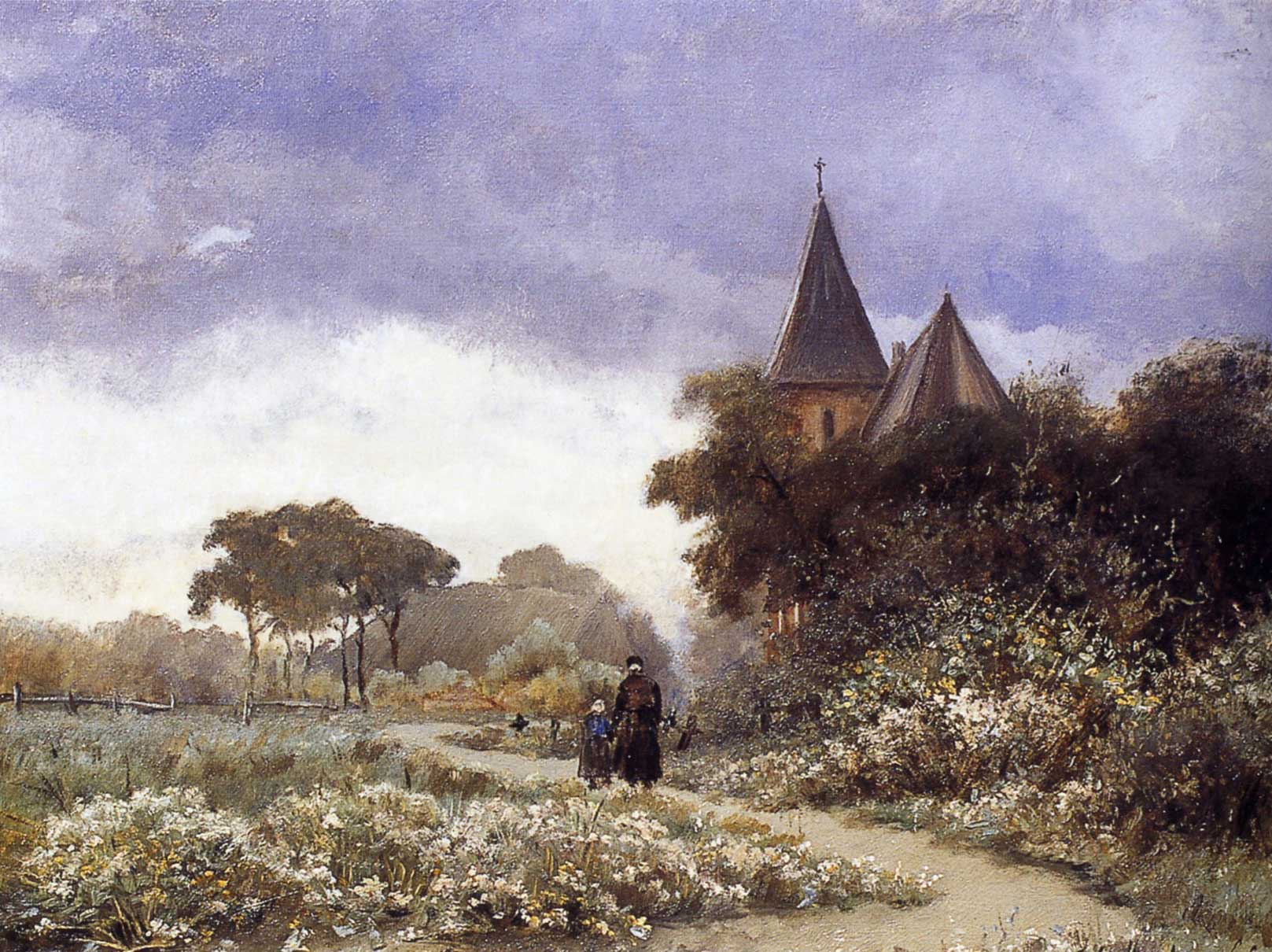
Zicht op Vries by Geesje van Calcar

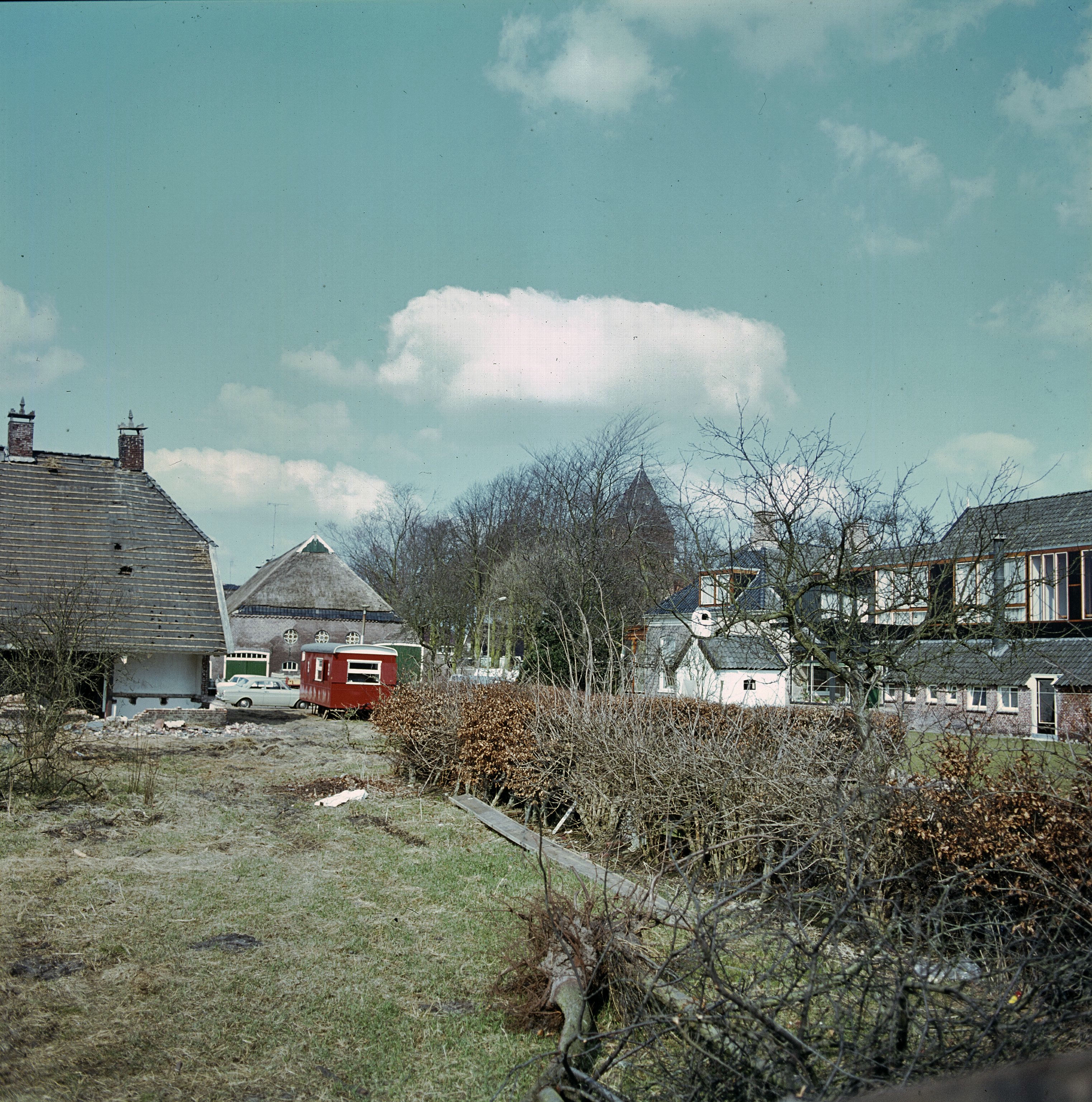
View on the brink (village square)

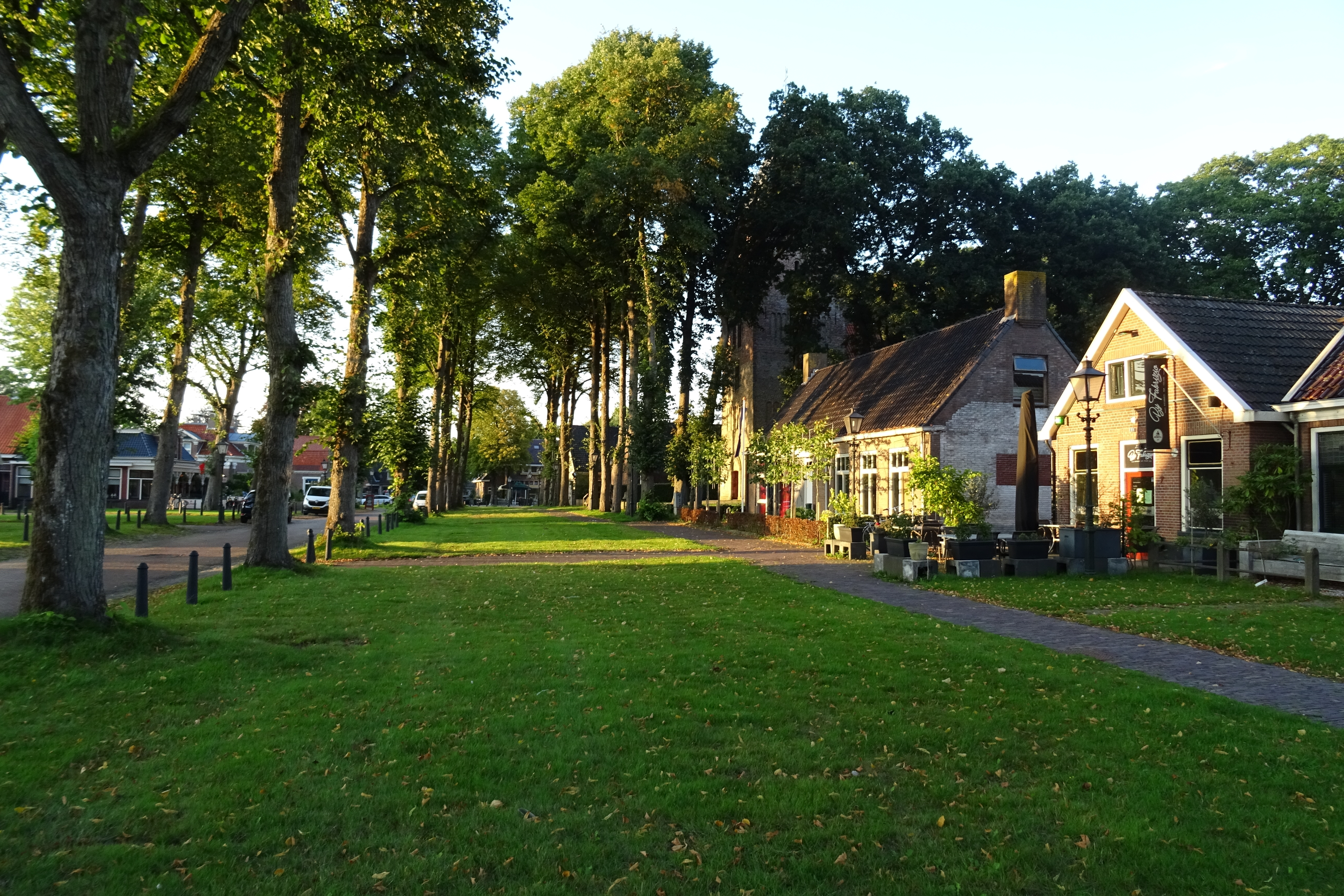
Street view

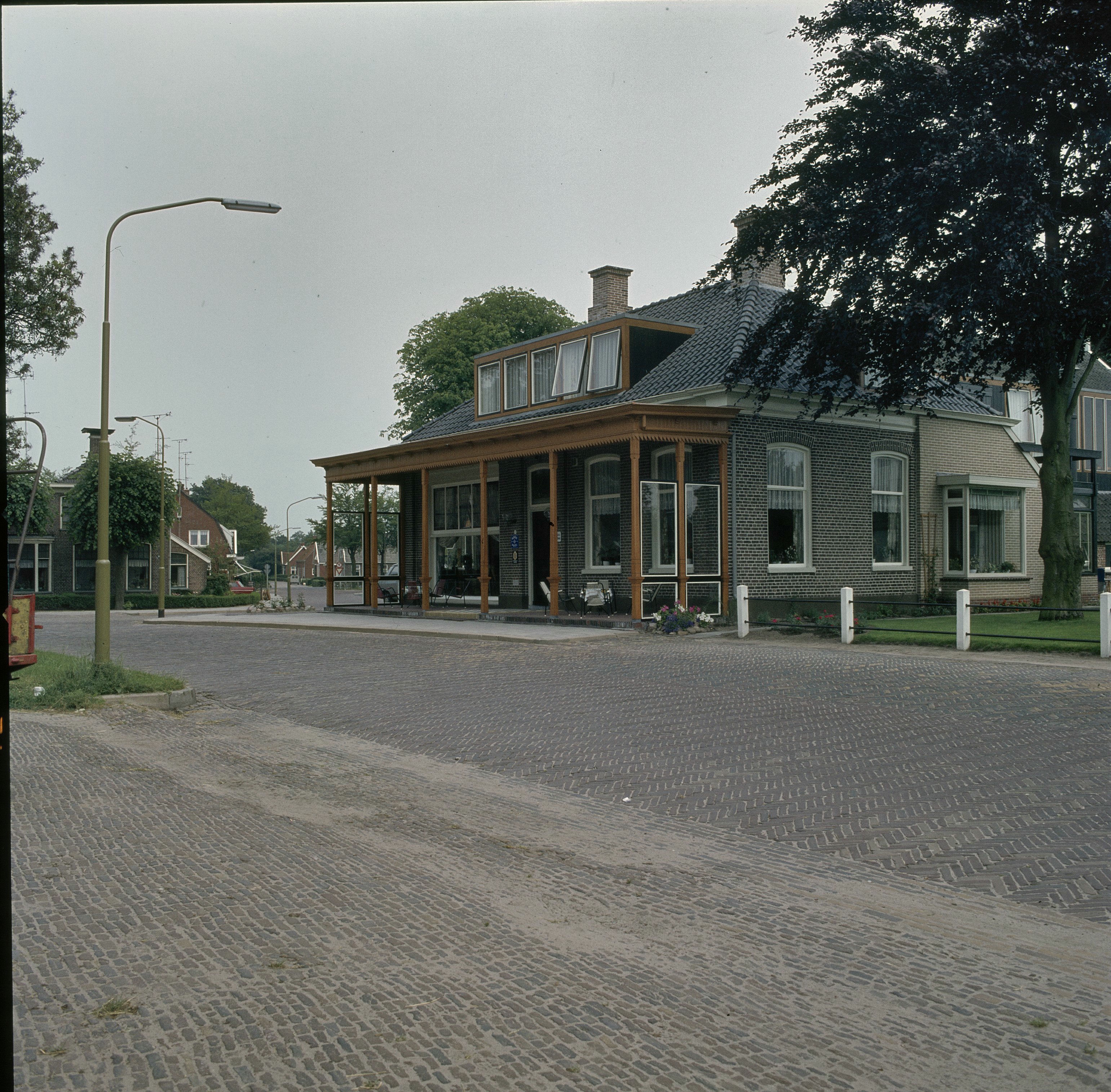
Hotel in Vries
