= Zuidlaarderveen =

- Village
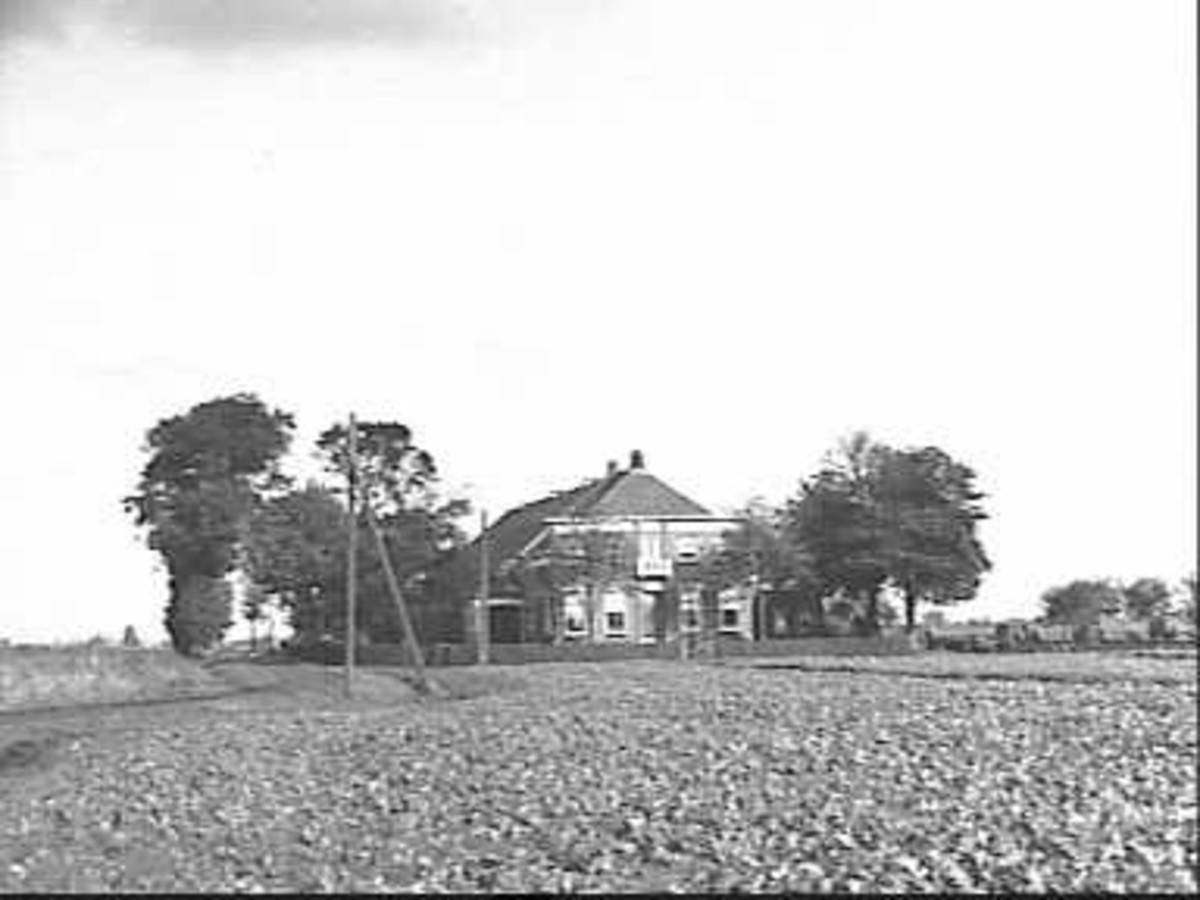
- Farm at Zuidlaarderveen

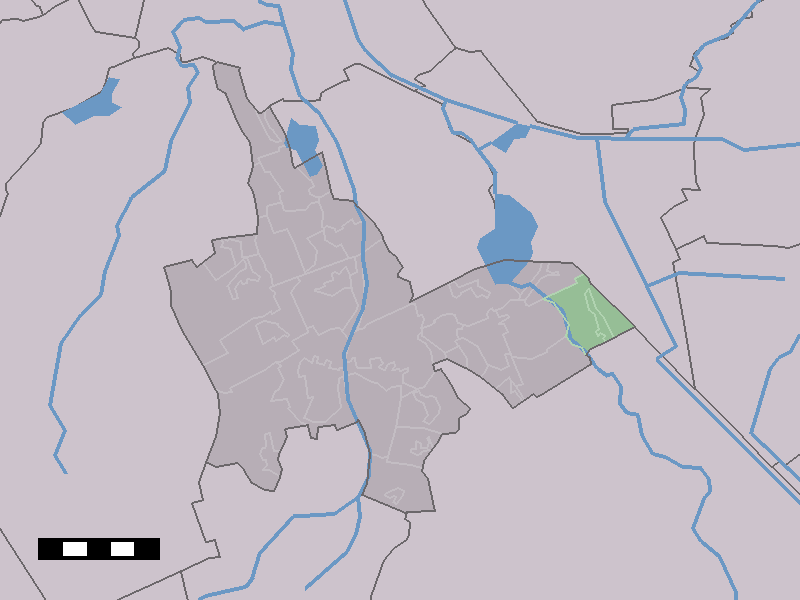
- Zuidlaarderveen in the municipality of Tynaarlo.

- Location in province of Drenthe in the Netherlands Zuidlaarderveen (Netherlands)
- Coordinates: 53°6′N 6°45′E
- Country: Netherlands
- Province: Drenthe
- Municipality: Tynaarlo

Area
  - Total: 6.07 km^{2} (2.34 sq mi)
- Elevation: 1.8 m (5.9 ft)

Population (2021)
  - Total: 320
  - Density: 53/km^{2} (140/sq mi)
- Time zone: UTC+1 (CET)
  - Summer (DST): UTC+2 (CEST)
- Postal code: 9474
- Dialing code: 0598

Zuidlaarderveen is a village in the Dutch province of Drenthe. It is a part of the municipality of Tynaarlo, and lies about 17 kilometres (11 mi) northeast of Assen.

The village was first mentioned around 1642 as "op Suitlarerveen", and means "peat excavation settlement of Zuidlaren". In 1262, the land was sold to the Aduard Abbey to excavate the peat and cultivate the land. In 1680, there was a dispute between the province of Groningen and Drenthe about the ownership of the area around Zuidlaarderveen. In 1713, a deal was reached about the border, and the village became part of Drenthe. The village started to develop in the 19th century. Zuidlaarderveen was home to 231 people 1840.
