= Winde =

- Village
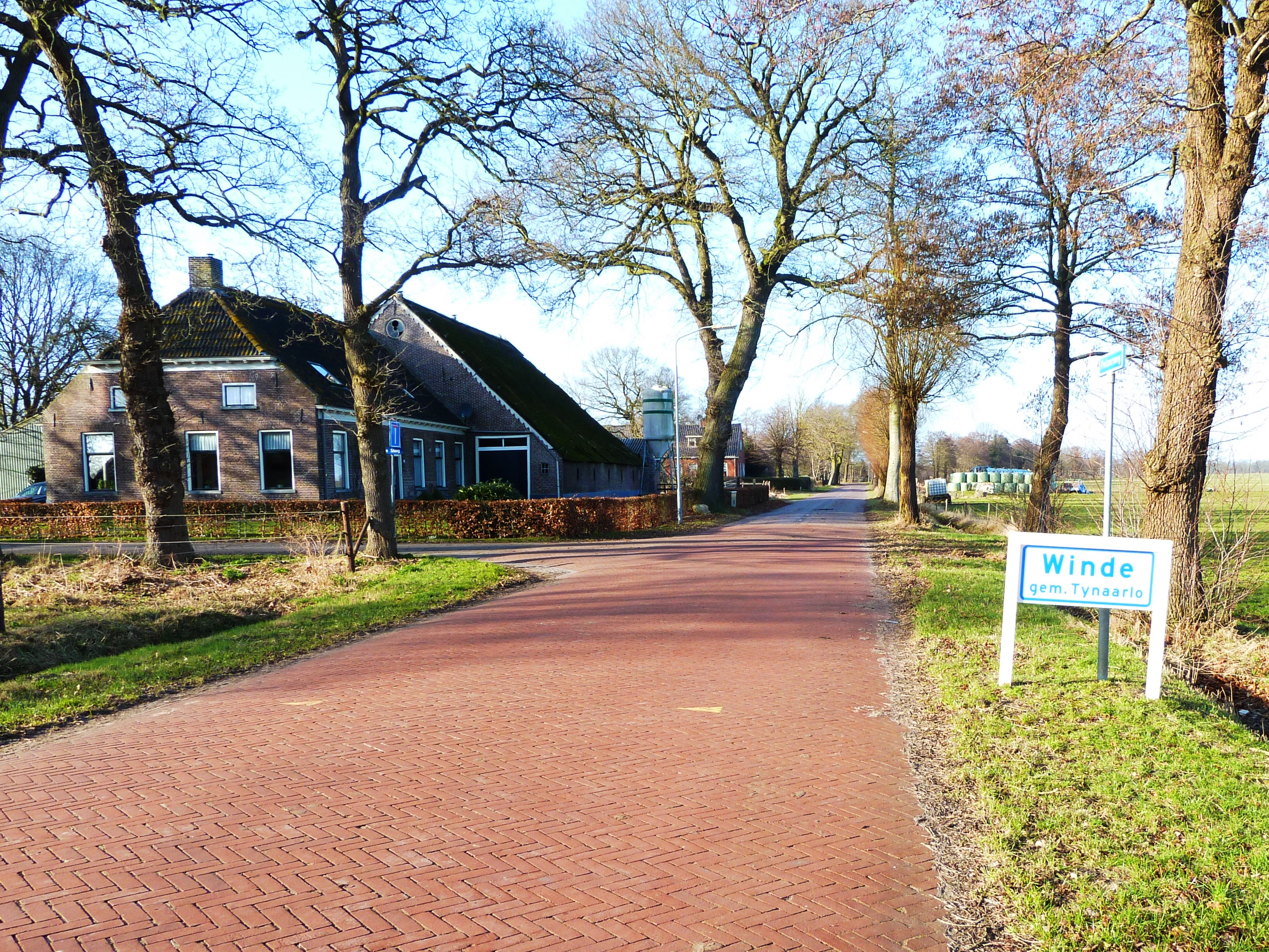

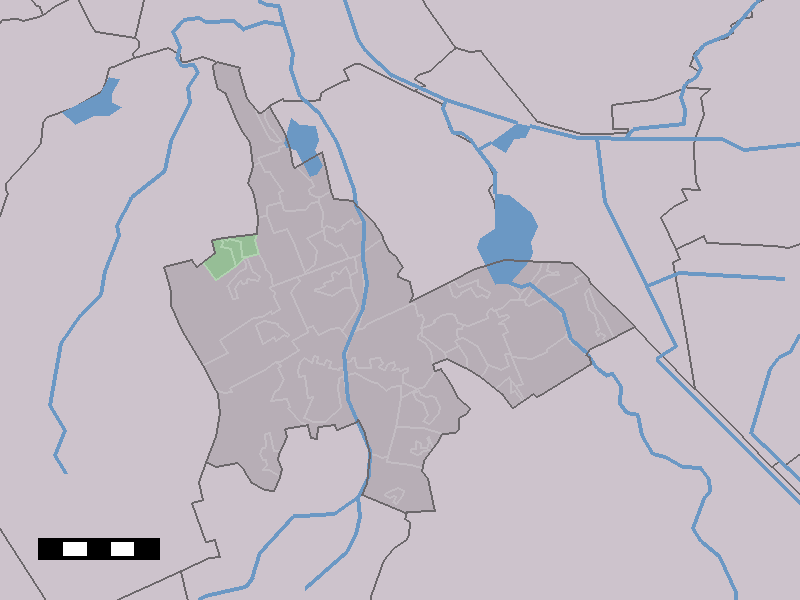
- Winde in the municipality of Tynaarlo.

- Location in the Netherlands Winde (Netherlands)
- Coordinates: 53°7′36″N 6°31′39″E
- Country: Netherlands
- Province: Drenthe
- Municipality: Tynaarlo

Area
  - Total: 2.53 km^{2} (0.98 sq mi)
- Elevation: 3.5 m (11 ft)

Population (2021)
  - Total: 95
  - Density: 38/km^{2} (97/sq mi)
- Time zone: UTC+1 (CET)
  - Summer (DST): UTC+2 (CEST)
- Postal code: 9495
- Dialing code: 050

Winde is a village in the Dutch province of Drenthe. It is a part of the municipality of Tynaarlo, and lies about 10 km south of Groningen.

The village was first mentioned in 1338 as de Winde. The etymology is unclear. Winde was home to 53 people in 1840.
