= Donderen =

- Village
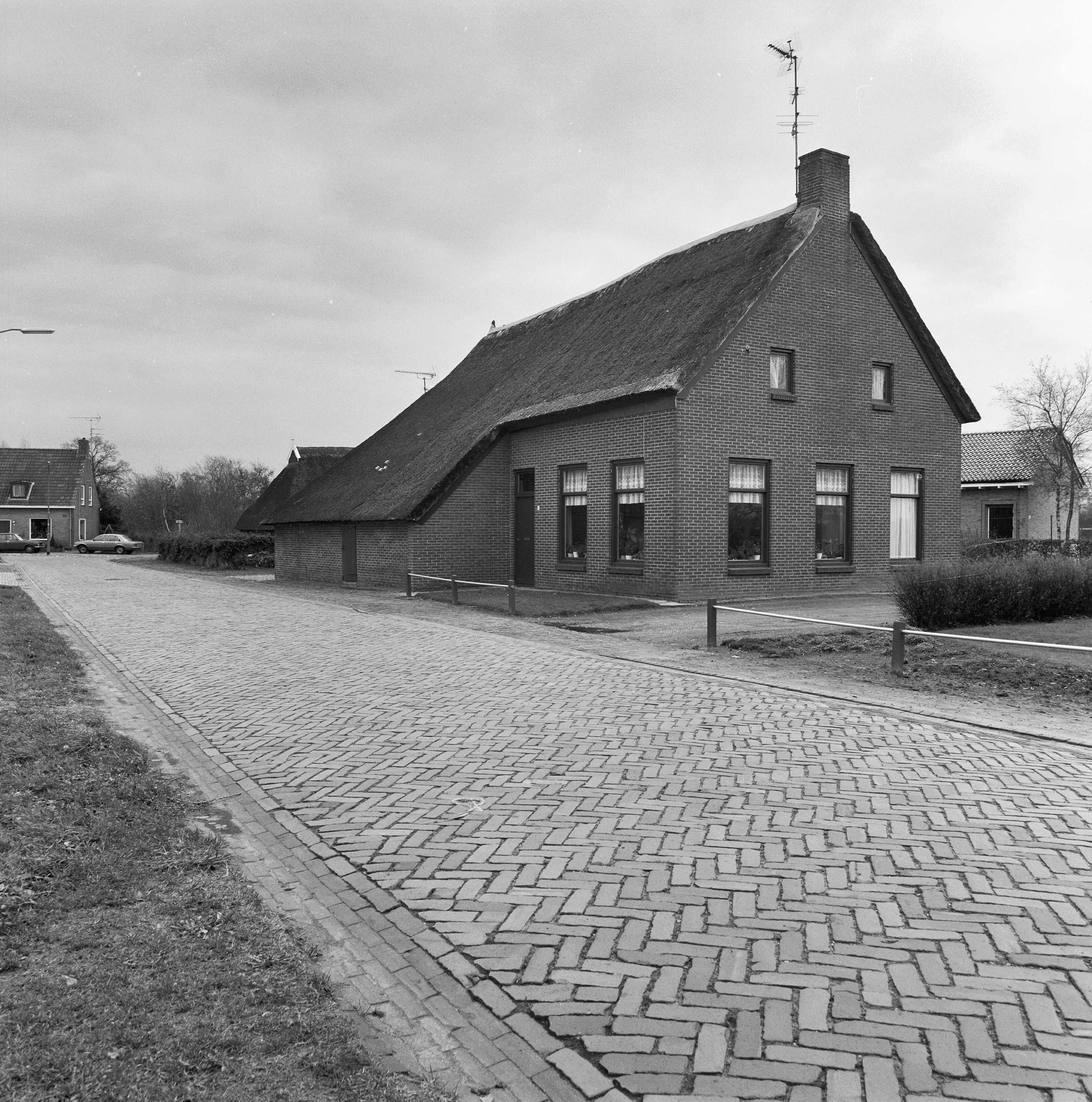
- Farm at Donderen

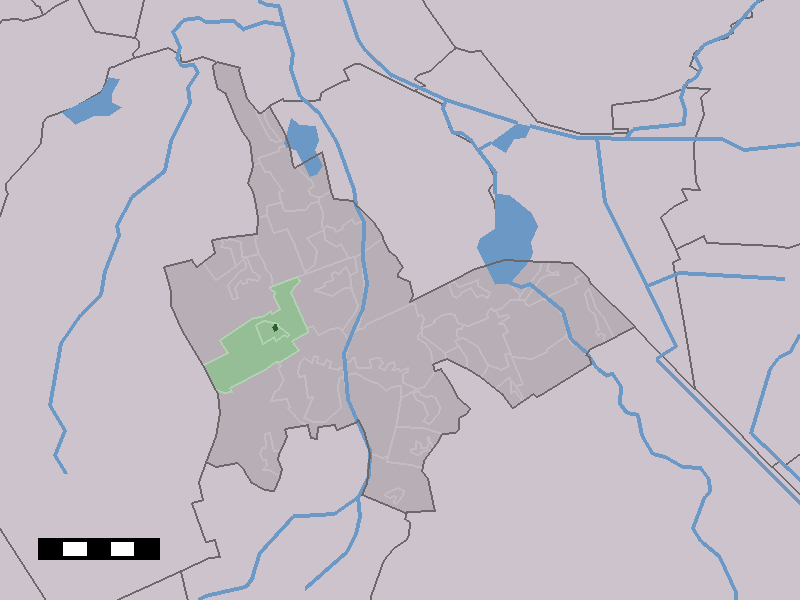
- The village centre (dark green) and the statistical district (light green) of Donderen in the municipality of Tynaarlo.

- Location in province of Drenthe in the Netherlands Donderen (Netherlands)
- Coordinates: 53°6′N 6°33′E
- Country: Netherlands
- Province: Drenthe
- Municipality: Tynaarlo

Area
  - Total: 9.15 km^{2} (3.53 sq mi)
- Elevation: 7 m (23 ft)

Population (2021)
  - Total: 475
  - Density: 51.9/km^{2} (134/sq mi)
- Time zone: UTC+1 (CET)
  - Summer (DST): UTC+2 (CEST)
- Postal code: 9497
- Dialing code: 0592

Donderen is a village in the Dutch province of Drenthe. It is a part of the municipality of Tynaarlo, and lies about 10 km north of Assen.

The village was first mentioned in 1276 as "Sigheri de Dunren". The etymology is unclear. Donderen was home to 267 people in 1840.

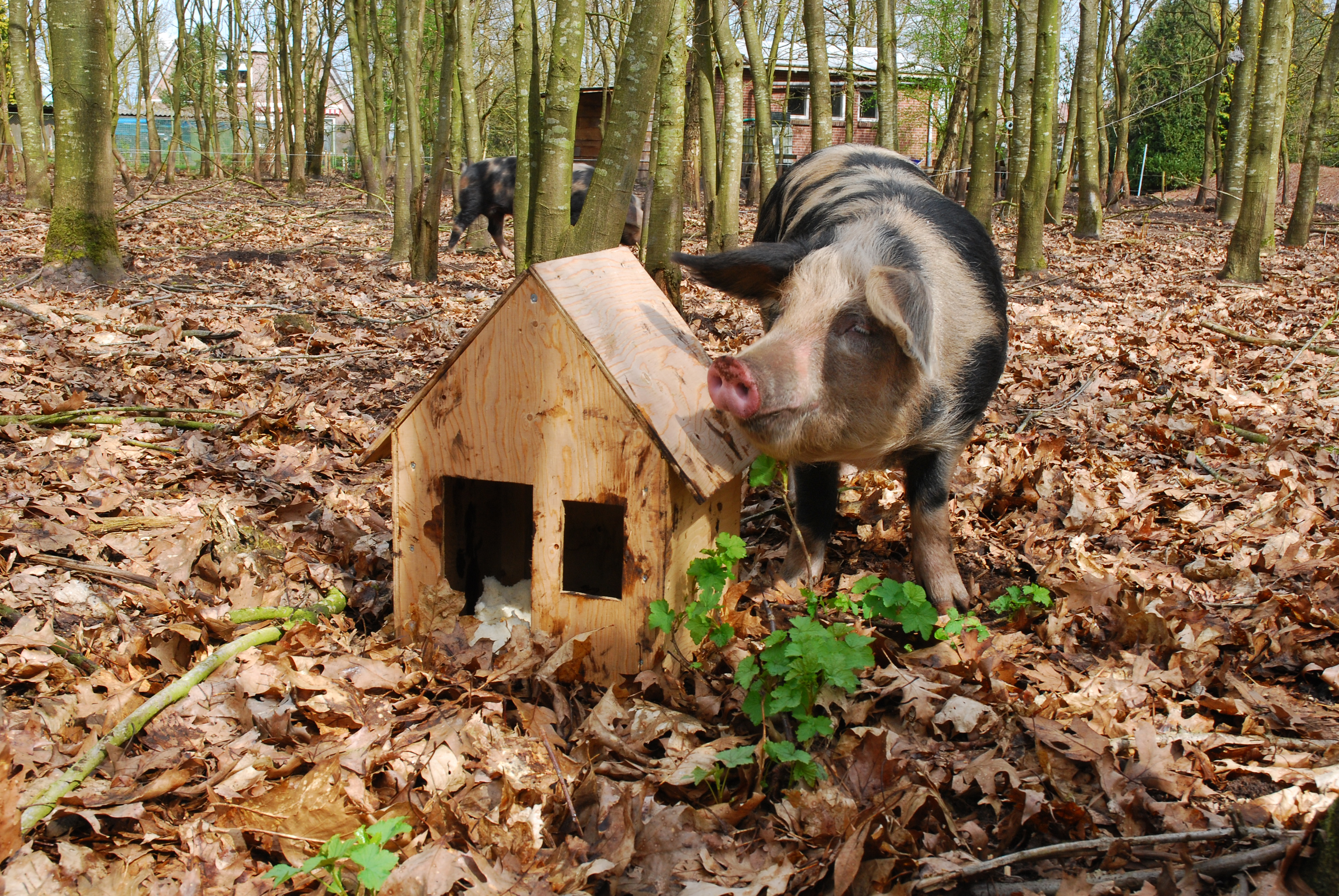
Pig house in Donderen
