= Eelde =

- Town
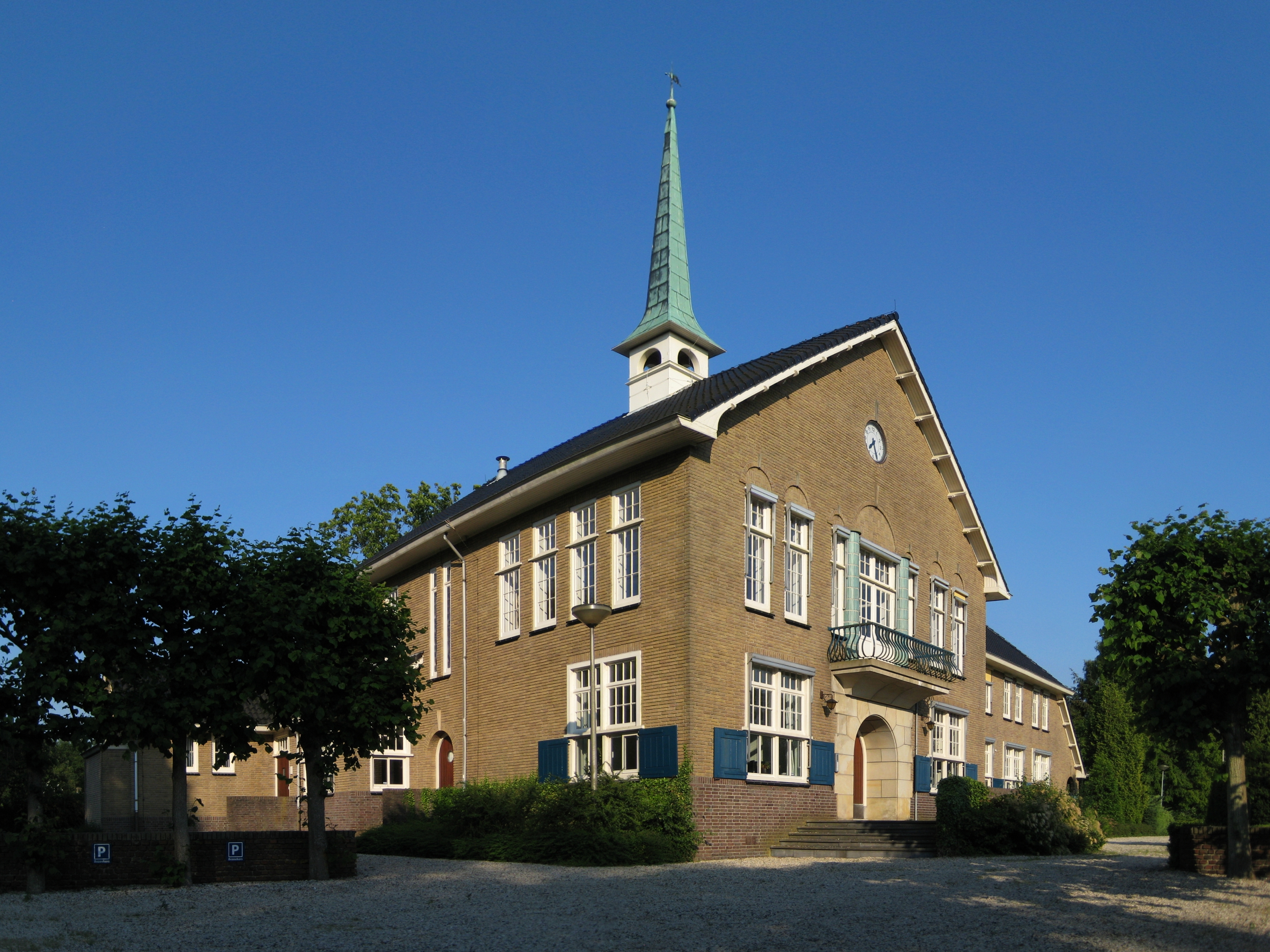
- Former townhall in 2010

- Flag Coat of arms

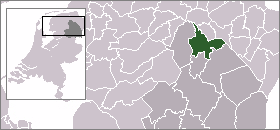

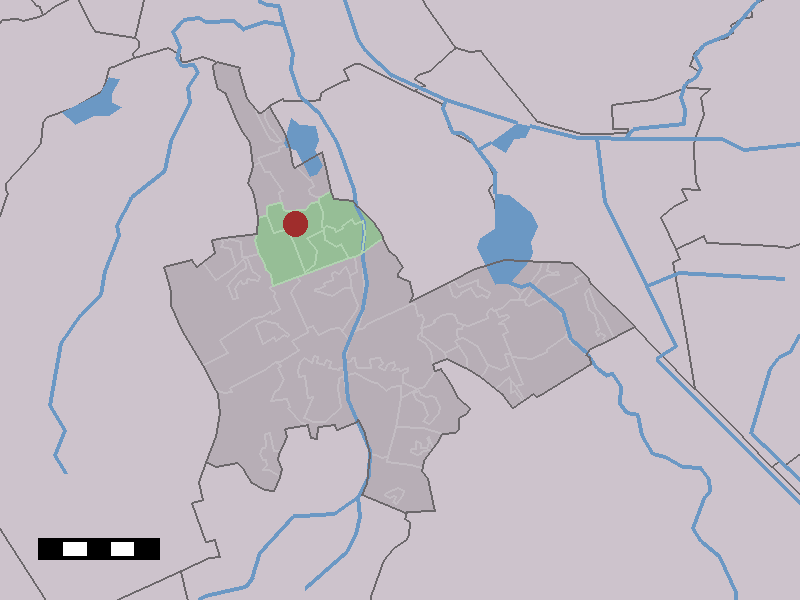
- The village (dark red) and the statistical district (light green) of Eelde in the municipality of Tynaarlo.
- Coordinates: 53°08′00″N 6°34′00″E
- Country: Netherlands
- Province: Drenthe
- Municipality: Tynaarlo

Population
  - Total: 7,000
- Eelde-Paterswolde ca. 11,000
- Time zone: UTC+1 (CET)
  - Summer (DST): UTC+2 (CEST)

Eelde (Dutch pronunciation: [ˈeːldə]) is a town in the Dutch province of Drenthe. It is a part of the municipality of Tynaarlo, and lies about 9 km south of Groningen. Groningen Airport Eelde is located near the village.

Eelde was a separate municipality until 1998, when it was merged with Vries and Zuidlaren.

During the 20th century, the villages of Eelde and Paterswolde have merged into one, "Eelde-Paterswolde". In 2012, Eelde counted 6,660 inhabitants, and Paterswolde 3,680, together 10,340 inhabitants.

Its major attractions are Groningen Airport Eelde, museum "De Buitenplaats", the annual flower parade and the lake "Paterswoldse meer".

== Climate ==
Climate data for Eelde (1991−2020 normals, extremes 1906−present)
Month	Jan	Feb	Mar	Apr	May	Jun	Jul	Aug	Sep	Oct	Nov	Dec	Year
Record high °C (°F)	14.5 (58.1)	18.9 (66.0)	24.0 (75.2)	28.8 (83.8)	32.8 (91.0)	33.8 (92.8)	36.9 (98.4)	36.3 (97.3)	32.6 (90.7)	27.4 (81.3)	19.4 (66.9)	15.4 (59.7)	36.9 (98.4)
Mean daily maximum °C (°F)	5.2 (41.4)	6.0 (42.8)	9.5 (49.1)	14.2 (57.6)	17.6 (63.7)	20.4 (68.7)	22.7 (72.9)	22.6 (72.7)	19.0 (66.2)	14.2 (57.6)	9.0 (48.2)	5.9 (42.6)	13.9 (57.0)
Daily mean °C (°F)	2.8 (37.0)	3.0 (37.4)	5.5 (41.9)	9.0 (48.2)	12.5 (54.5)	15.4 (59.7)	17.5 (63.5)	17.3 (63.1)	14.1 (57.4)	10.3 (50.5)	6.3 (43.3)	3.5 (38.3)	9.8 (49.6)
Mean daily minimum °C (°F)	0.1 (32.2)	−0.1 (31.8)	1.4 (34.5)	3.7 (38.7)	7.0 (44.6)	9.9 (49.8)	12.2 (54.0)	11.9 (53.4)	9.4 (48.9)	6.3 (43.3)	3.2 (37.8)	0.8 (33.4)	5.5 (41.9)
Record low °C (°F)	−22.0 (−7.6)	−22.9 (−9.2)	−18.4 (−1.1)	−8.1 (17.4)	−3.4 (25.9)	0.1 (32.2)	2.5 (36.5)	3.2 (37.8)	−1.0 (30.2)	−6.9 (19.6)	−13.6 (7.5)	−22.0 (−7.6)	−22.9 (−9.2)
Average precipitation mm (inches)	72.7 (2.86)	54.7 (2.15)	54.1 (2.13)	41.3 (1.63)	57.9 (2.28)	65.0 (2.56)	85.0 (3.35)	77.8 (3.06)	75.4 (2.97)	71.4 (2.81)	70.0 (2.76)	79.4 (3.13)	804.7 (31.68)
Average precipitation days (≥ 1.0 mm)	13.3	10.6	10.3	8.5	9.5	10.3	11.7	11.5	11.1	12.1	13.2	14.0	136.0
Average relative humidity (%)	89.5	87.0	82.8	77.5	77.3	79.0	79.8	81.3	84.8	87.6	91.1	91.2	84.1
Mean monthly sunshine hours	60.7	86.1	139.0	188.7	218.0	198.6	212.3	196.3	150.7	112.9	63.4	56.1	1,682.8
Percentage possible sunshine	24.0	30.8	37.7	45.0	44.4	39.3	41.8	42.8	39.4	34.2	24.2	23.7	35.6
Source: Royal Netherlands Meteorological Institute
