= Tynaarlo =

- Village and municipality
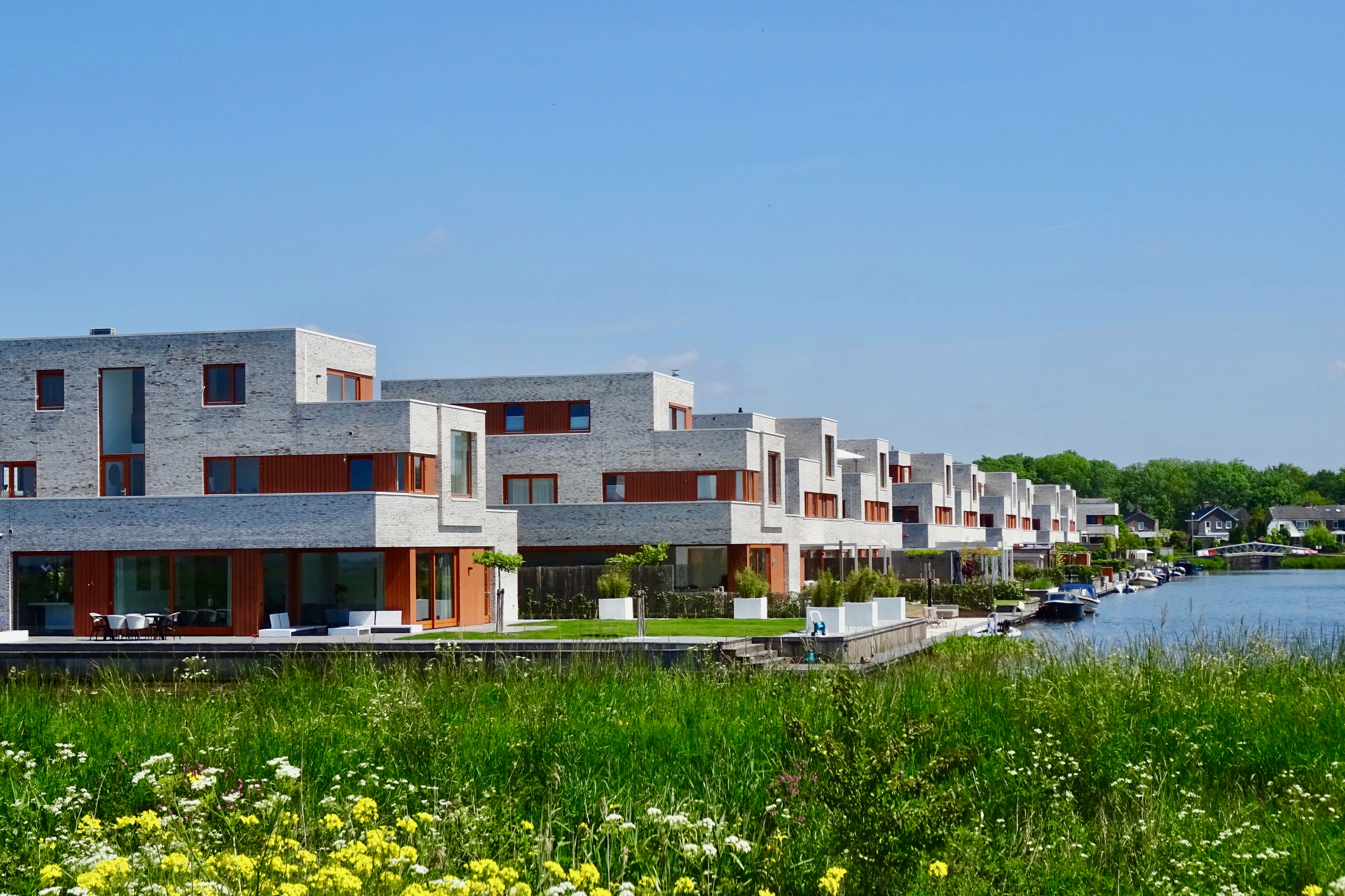
- Waterwijk in the municipality of Tynaarlo

- Flag Coat of arms

- Location in Drenthe
- Coordinates: 53°5′N 6°35′E
- Country: Netherlands
- Province: Drenthe
- Established: 1 January 1998
- Renamed: 1 January 2000

Government
  - Body: Municipal council
  - Mayor: Marcel Thijsen

Area
  - Total: 147.70 km^{2} (57.03 sq mi)
  - Land: 143.00 km^{2} (55.21 sq mi)
  - Water: 4.70 km^{2} (1.81 sq mi)
- Elevation: 6 m (20 ft)

Population (January 2021)
  - Total: 33,978
  - Density: 238/km^{2} (620/sq mi)
- Time zone: UTC+1 (CET)
  - Summer (DST): UTC+2 (CEST)
- Postcode: Parts of 9000 range
- Area code: 050, 0592, 0598
- Website: www.tynaarlo.nl

Tynaarlo (pronounced [tiˈnaːrloː]; Gronings: Tynaorl) is a village and municipality in the Northeastern Netherlands. Although it is located in the province of Drenthe, many of its communities serve as suburbs of the neighbouring city of Groningen, capital of the eponymous province. In 2019, the municipality of Tynaarlo had a population of 33,698.

== History ==
The municipality of Tynaarlo was established in 1998 as the merger of the former municipalities of Eelde, Vries and Zuidlaren; it was supposed to retain the name of the latter, but after the two first voiced their discontent, the name of the smaller central village of Tynaarlo was chosen.

== Population centres ==
- Bunne
- Bunnerveen
- De Groeve
- De Punt
- Donderen
- Eelde
- Eelderwolde
- Midlaren
- Oudemolen
- Paterswolde
- Taarlo
- Tynaarlo
- Vries
- Winde
- Yde
- Zeegse
- Zeijen
- Zuidlaarderveen
- Zuidlaren

=== Topography ===
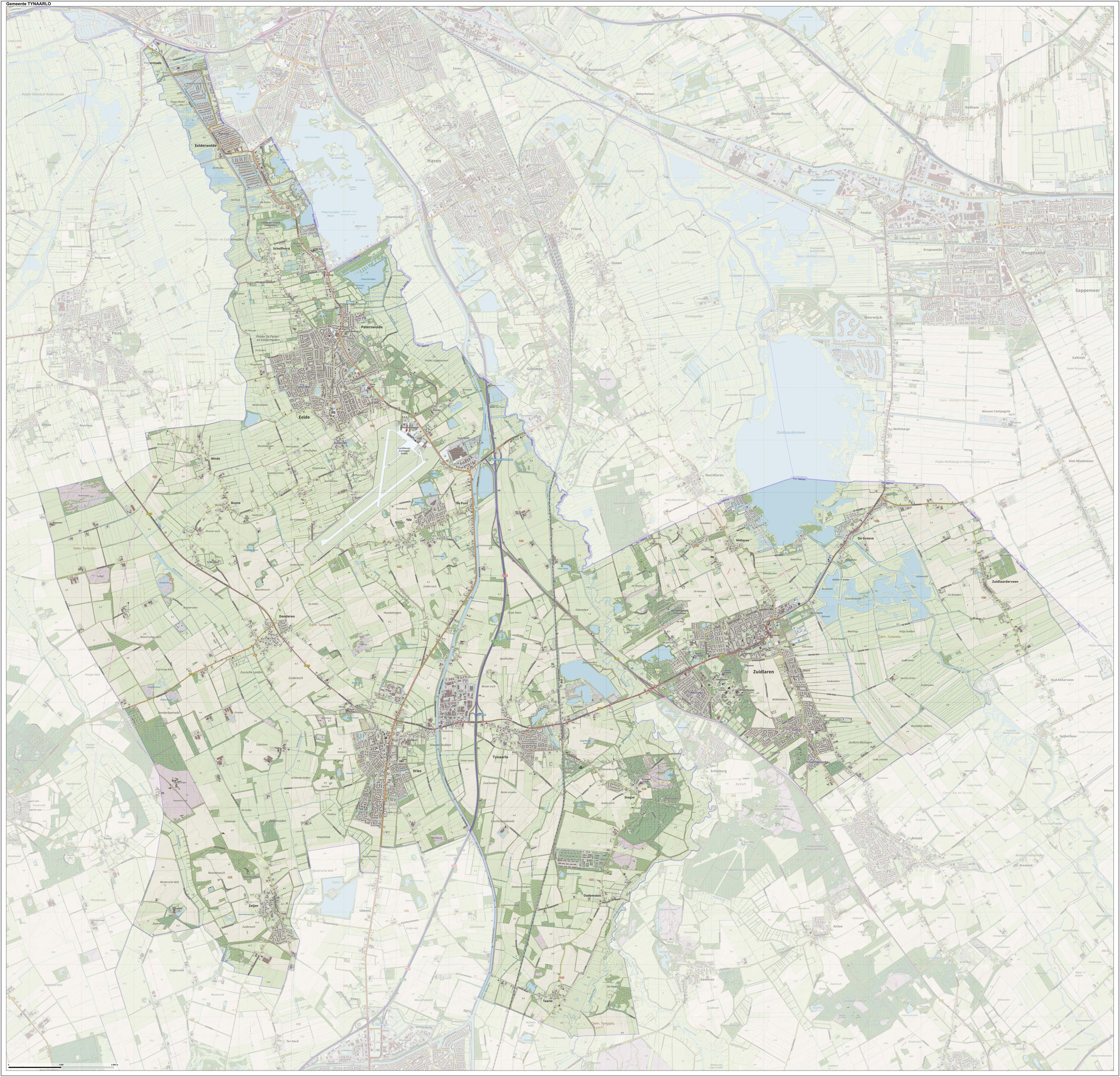

== Village of Tynaarlo ==
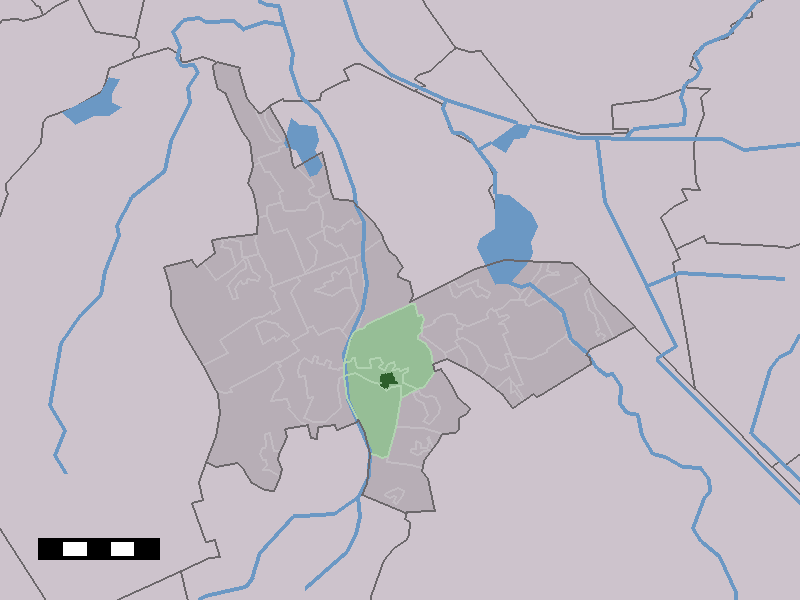
The village of Tynaarlo (dark green), statistical district (light green) in the municipality (dark grey)

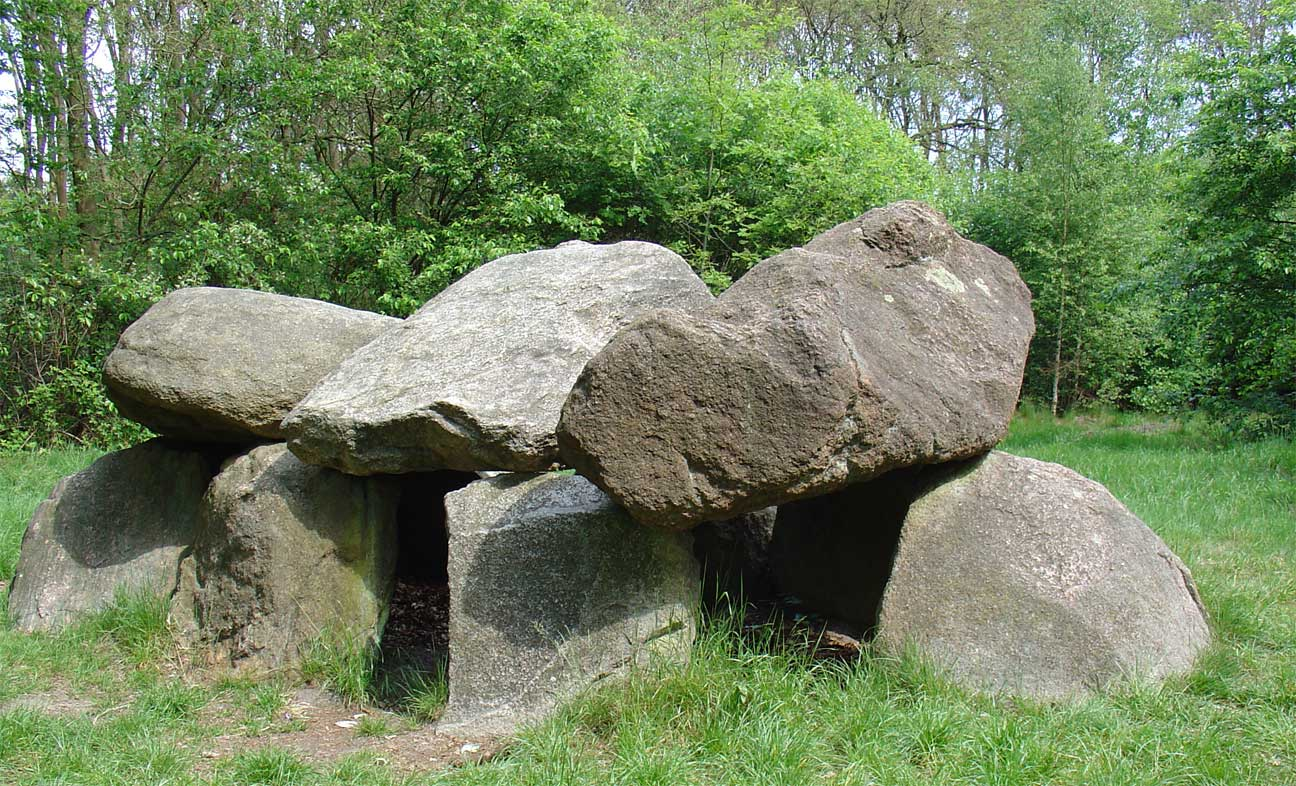
Dolmen D6 near the village of Tynaarlo

The village of Tynaarlo is a part of the municipality and lies about 9 km (5.6 mi) north of Assen. It is situated between the three largest villages of the municipality: Zuidlaren, Eelde and Vries. Tynaarlo is located close to the motorway A28, which is a connection to the south and the west of the country.

In 2001, the village of Tynaarlo had 1,009 inhabitants. The built-up area of the village was 0.29 km^{2} (0.11 sq mi); it contained 427 residences. The statistical district of Tynaarlo, which also includes the surrounding countryside, has a population of 1,920.

== Notable people ==
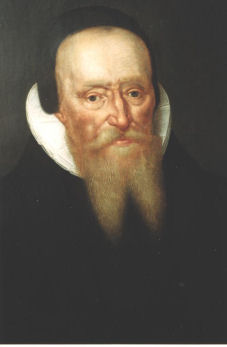
Menso Alting

- Menso Alting (1541 in Eelde – 1612), a Dutch Reformed preacher and reformer
- Lodewijk van Heiden (1772 in Zuidlaren – 1850), a Dutch admiral

=== Sport ===
- Jaap Helder (1907 in Paterswolde – 1998), a Dutch sailor who participated in the 1960 Summer Olympics
- Roelof Koops (1909 in Zuidlaren – 2008), a Dutch speed skater who competed in the 1936 Winter Olympics
- Paul Matthijs (born 1976 in Paterswolde), a Dutch footballer with over 300 club caps
- Jos Hooiveld (born 1983 in Zeijen), a Dutch footballer with over 300 club caps
- Willemijn Bos (born 1988 in Eelde), a Dutch field hockey defender, team silver medallist at the 2016 Summer Olympics

== Gallery ==
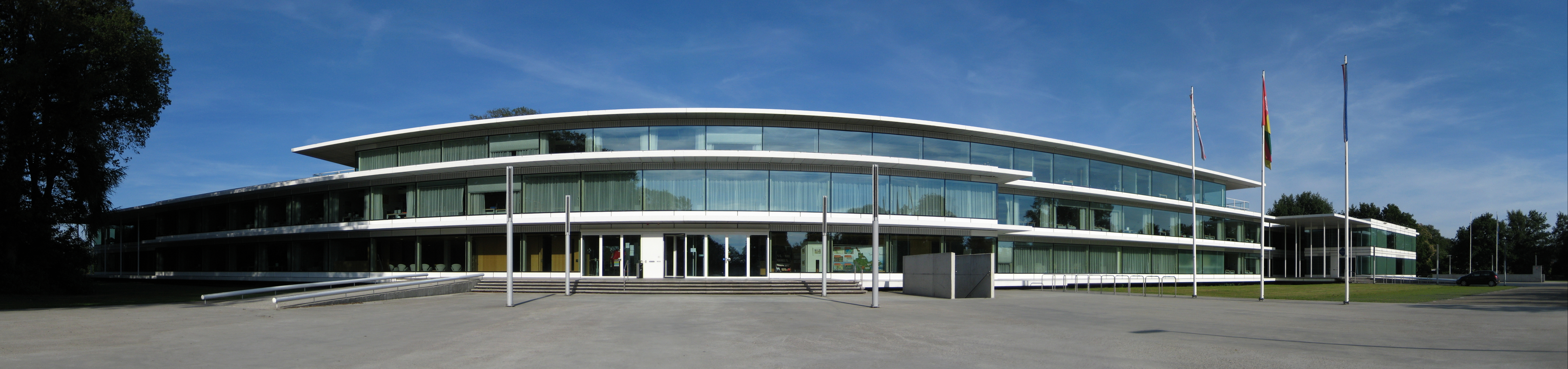
The Tynaarlo Town Hall in 2010. The building was completed in 2004 and designed by the architects Claus & Kaan.
