= Paterswolde =

- Village
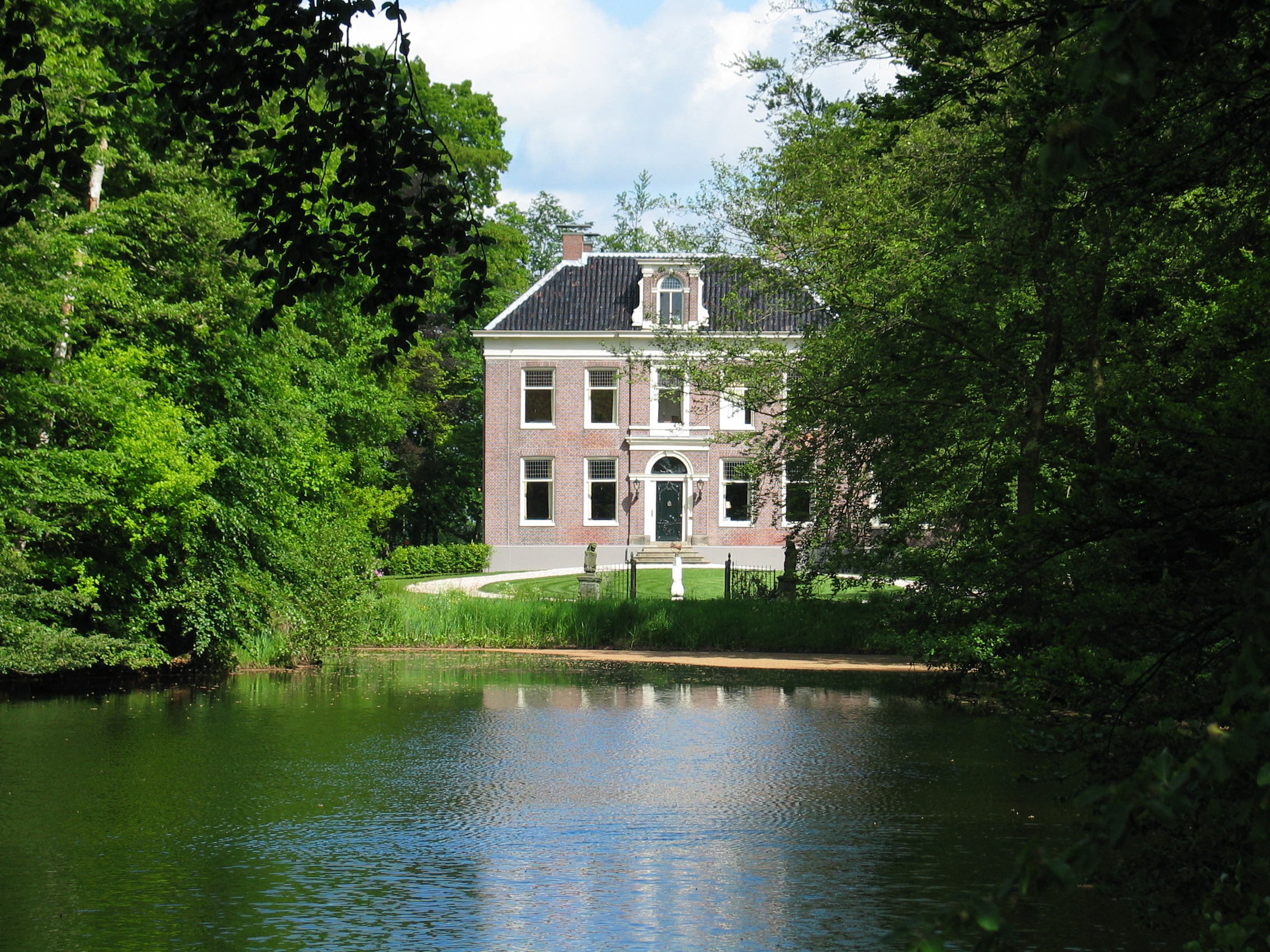
- Mansion Vennebroek in 2004

- Location in the province of Drenthe in the Netherlands Paterswolde (Netherlands)
- Coordinates: 53°9′N 6°34′E
- Country: Netherlands
- Province: Drenthe, Groningen
- Municipality: Tynaarlo, Groningen

Area
  - Total: 6.89 km^{2} (2.66 sq mi)
- Elevation: 2.6 m (8.5 ft)

Population (2021)
  - Total: 3,795
  - Density: 551/km^{2} (1,430/sq mi)
- Time zone: UTC+1 (CET)
  - Summer (DST): UTC+2 (CEST)
- Postal code: 9765
- Dialing code: 050

Paterswolde is a village in the Dutch province of Drenthe. It is a part of the municipality of Tynaarlo, and lies about 8 km south of city of Groningen. Paterswolde and Eelde has merged into a single urban area, and are often referred to as Eelde-Paterswolde, however they remain separate villages.

A small part of the village, on the south end of the lake Paterwoldsemeer, lies in the province of Groningen, in the municipality of Groningen.

== History ==
The village was first mentioned in 1408 as Potterwolt, and means "the woods of Potter (person)". Paterswolde is a road village from the Early Middle Ages which started to develop when peat was excavation in the nearby raised bog.

During the 18th and 19th century, villas and estates were built in Paterswolde mainly by nobility and industrialists from the city of Groningen.

Paterswolde was home to 795 people in 1840. The Paterwoldsemeer and the Friesche Veen became a water sports and recreational area during the 20th century. Between 1955 and 1956, the Assumption of Mary Church was built in Paterswolde.

== Gallery ==
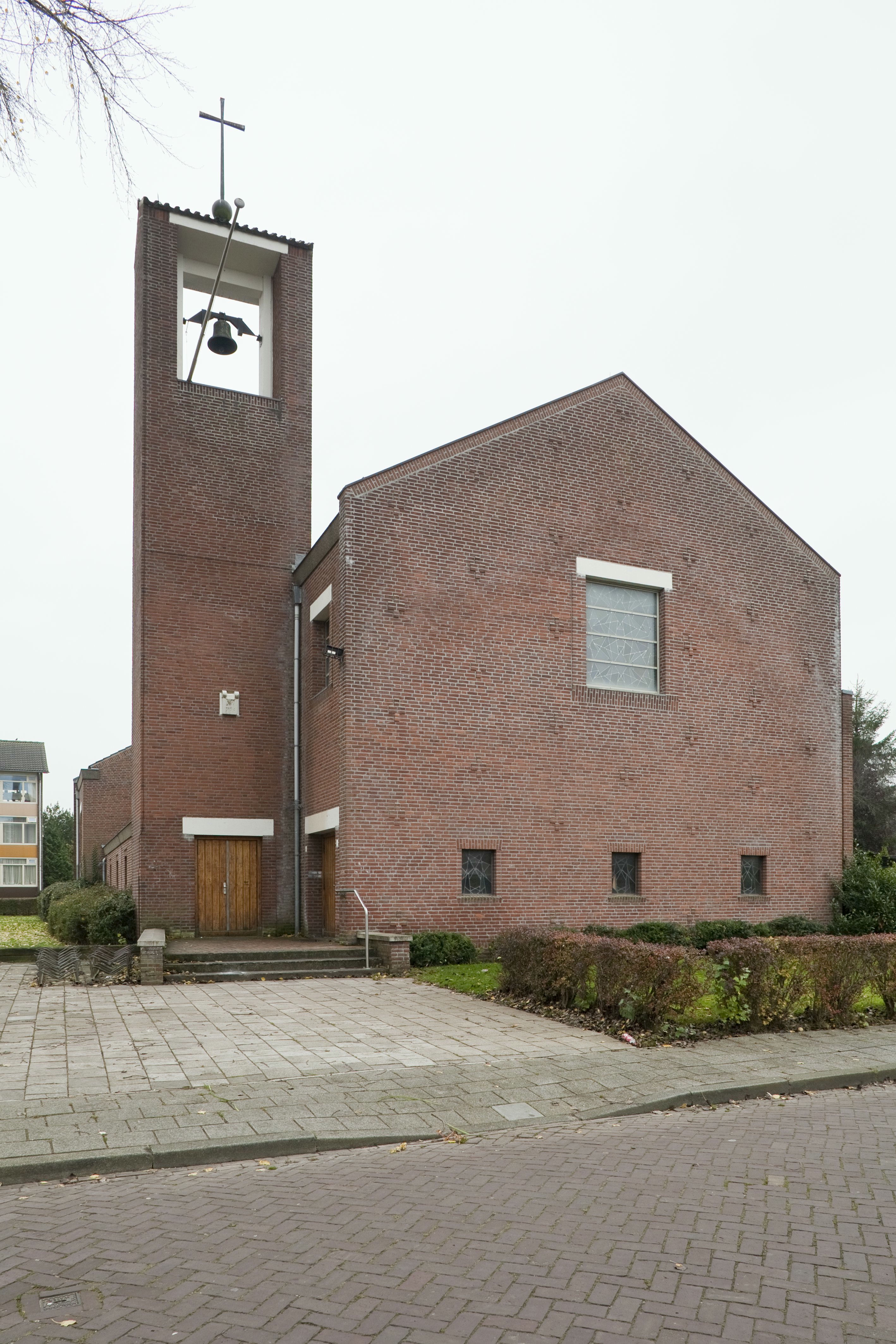
Assumption of Mary Church

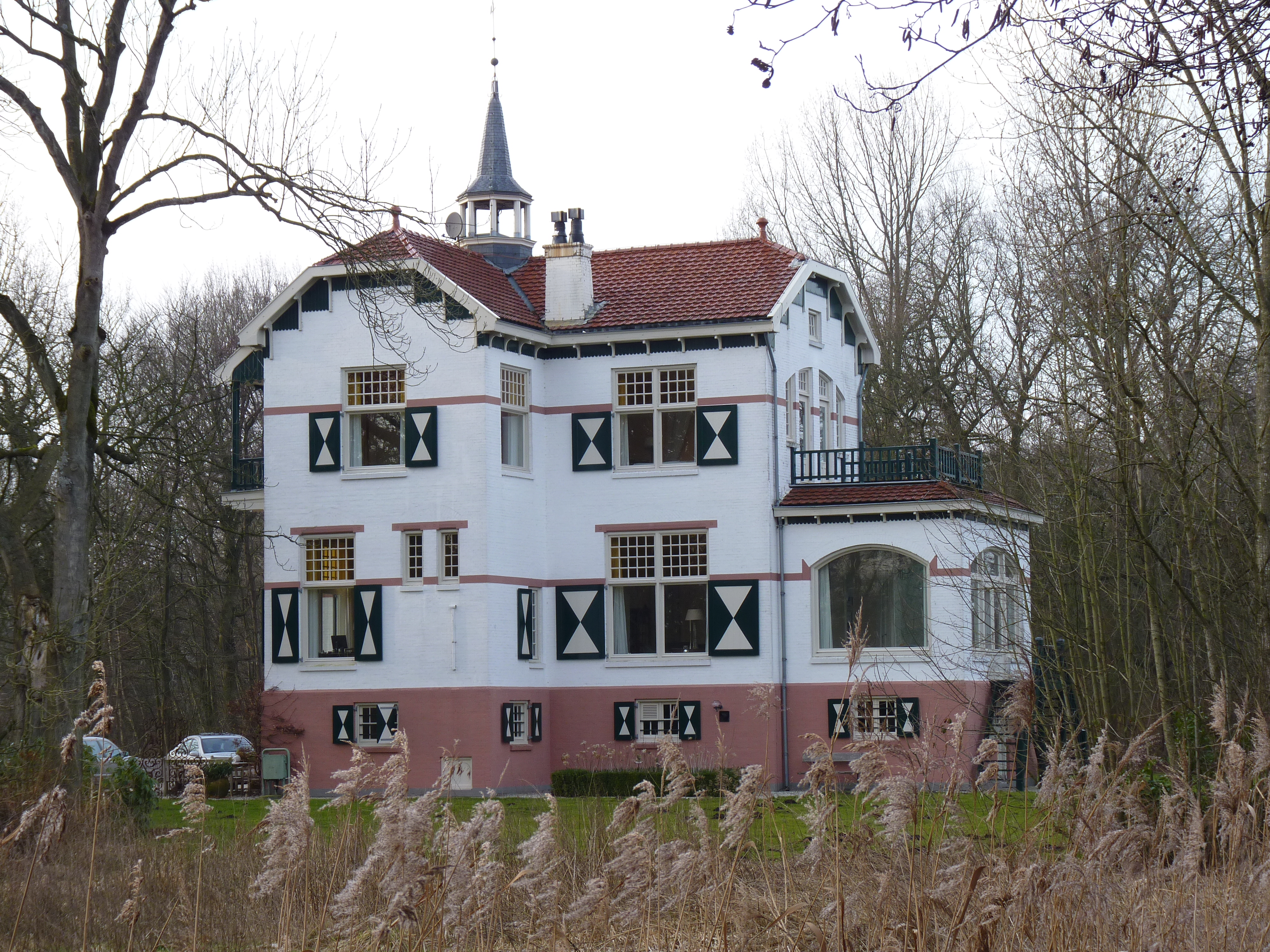
Villa in Paterswolde

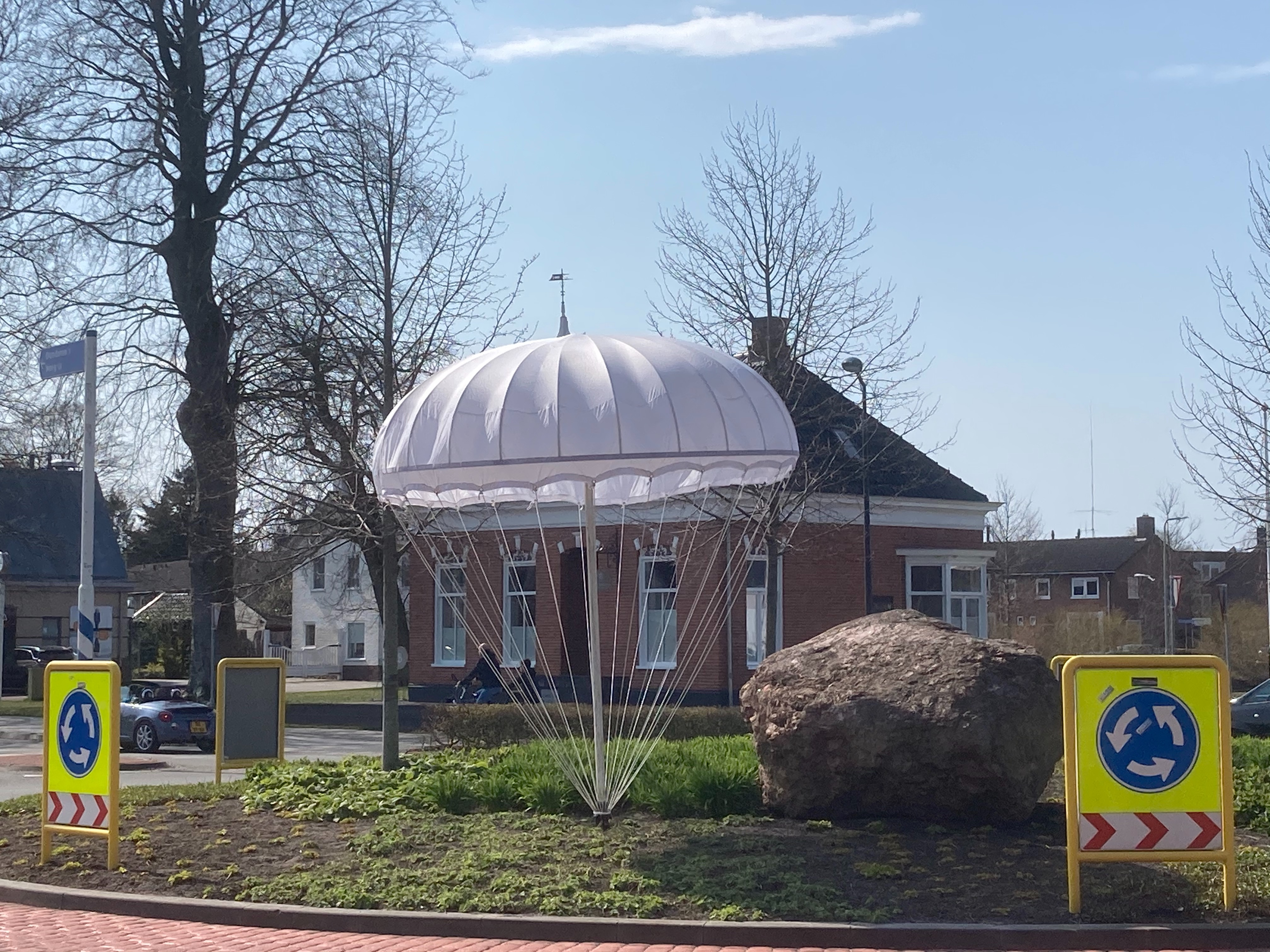
Roundabout art

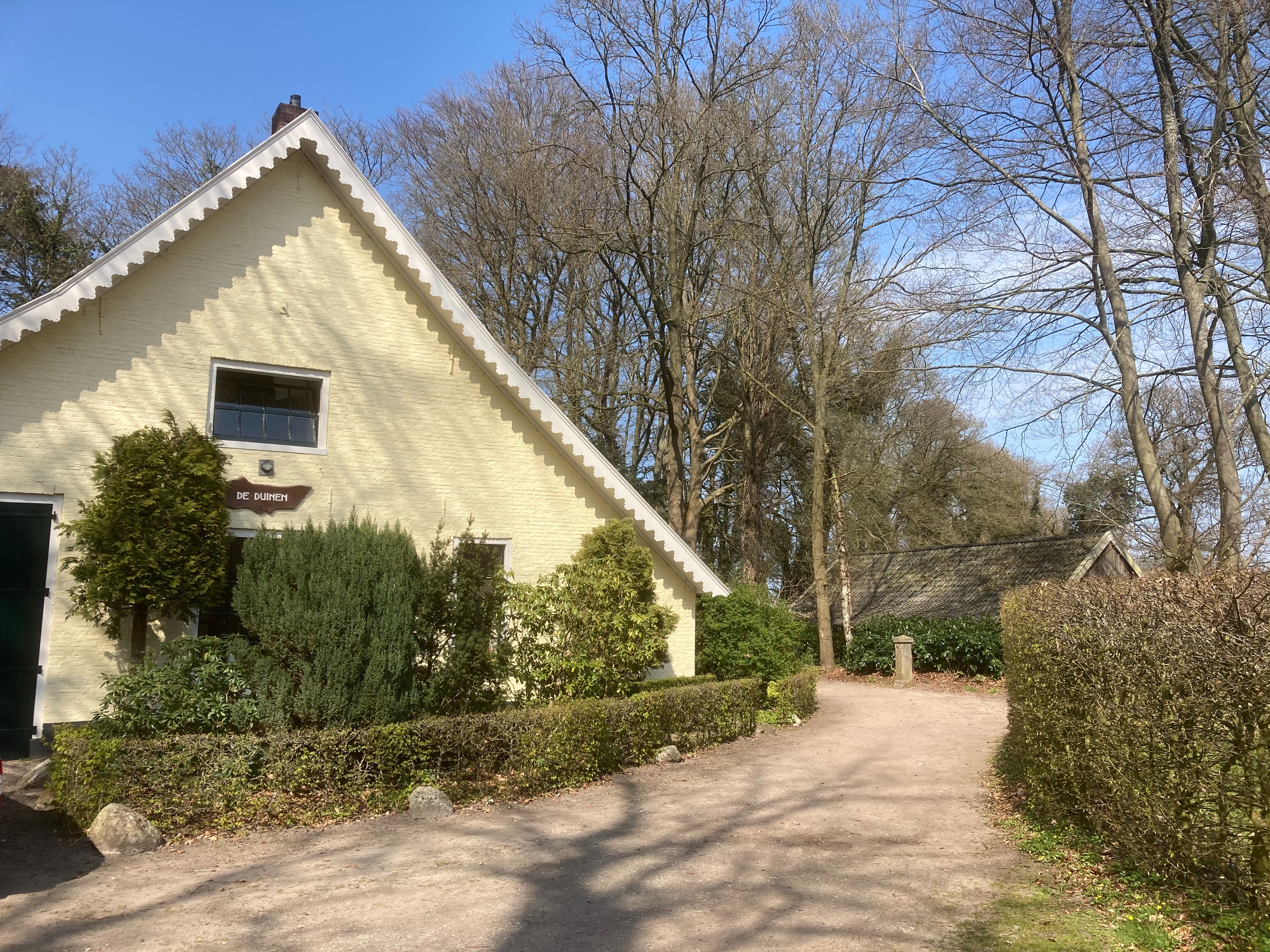
House in Paterswolde
