= Oud-Annerveen =

Oud Annerveen
- Village
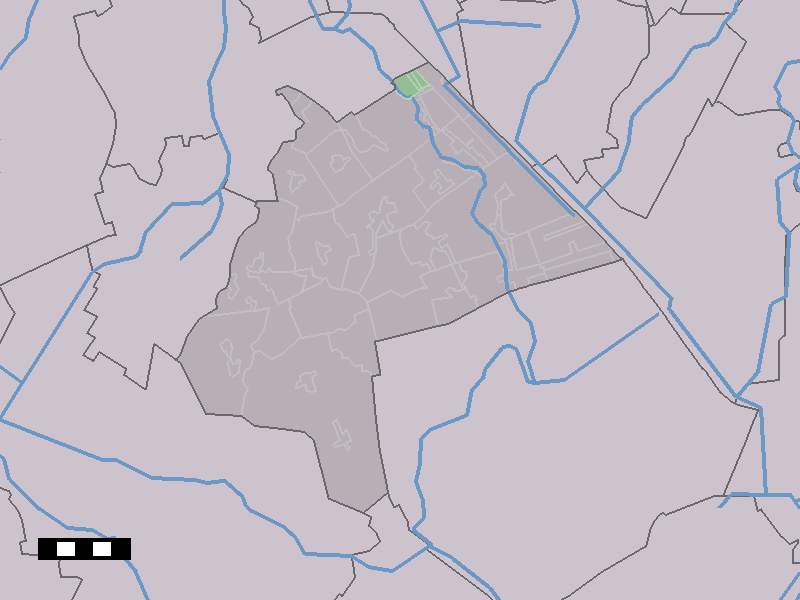
- Oud-Annerveen in the municipality of Aa en Hunze.

- Location in the Netherlands Oud Annerveen (Netherlands)
- Coordinates: 53°5′19″N 6°45′38″E
- Country: Netherlands
- Province: Drenthe
- Municipality: Aa en Hunze

Area
  - Total: 2.03 km^{2} (0.78 sq mi)
- Elevation: 2 m (6.6 ft)

Population (2021)
  - Total: 125
  - Density: 61.6/km^{2} (159/sq mi)
- Time zone: UTC+1 (CET)
  - Summer (DST): UTC+2 (CEST)
- Postal code: 9655
- Dialing code: 0598

Oud-Annerveen is a small village in the municipality of Aa en Hunze in the Dutch province of Drenthe. It lies in the extreme northwest of the town. It lies on the southeast side against Spijkerboor in the northeast bordering the Zuidlaarderveen. The Hunze river flows parallel to the main street, just south of the village.

The village was first mentioned in 1498 as "dat vene gelegen up Anner vene", and means "the old peat (colony) belonging to Annen. Oud (old) has been added to distinguish between Nieuw-Annerveen. Oud-Annerveen developed when the communal lands where split in 1457. It was mainly inhabited by small farmers who excavated the peat and worked the land.

Oud-Annerveen was home to 191 people in 1840.
