= Munnekezijlstermolen, Munnekezijl =

Windmill in Munnekezijl, Netherlands

Munnekezijlstermolen, Munnekekzijl
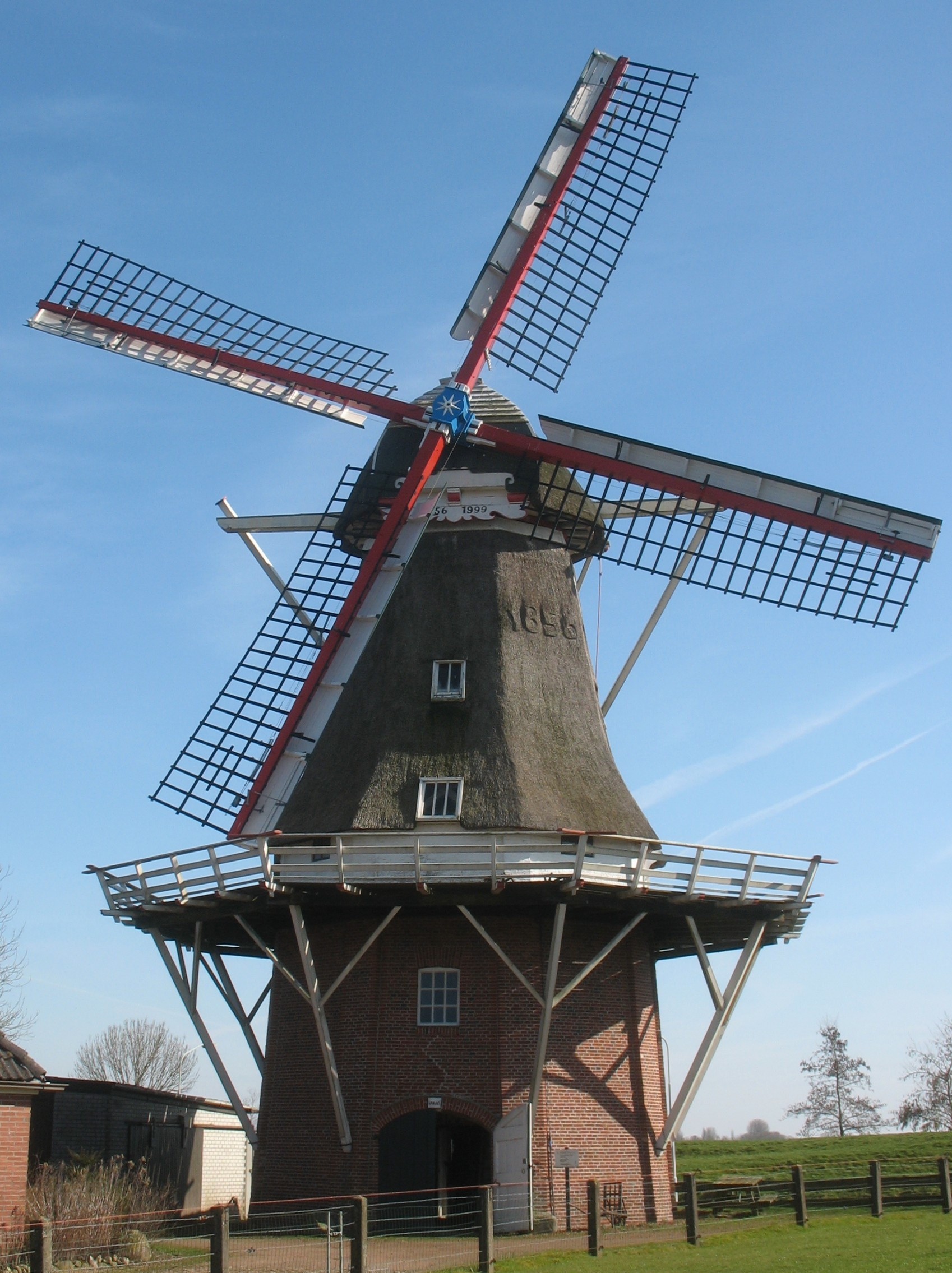
- Munnekezijlstermolen, March 2009
- Interactive map of Munnekezijlstermolen, Munnekekzijl

Origin
- Mill name: Munnekezijlstermolen or Rust Roest
- Mill location: Poorthoek 8, 9853 PE Munnekekzijl
- Coordinates: 53°18′15″N 6°16′28″E
- Operator: Stichting Erfgoed Kollumerland en Nieuwkruisland
- Year built: 1856

Information
- Purpose: Corn mill, formerly also a pearl barley mill
- Type: Smock mill
- Storeys: Two storey smock
- Base storeys: Three storey base
- Smock sides: Eight sides
- No. of sails: Four sails
- Type of sails: Common sails with Fok system on leading edges
- Windshaft: Cast iron
- Winding: Tailpole and winch
- Auxiliary power: Diesel engine
- No. of pairs of millstones: Two pairs of millstones, plus a third pair driven by engine
- Size of millstones: Two pairs 1.50 metres (4 ft 11 in) diameter, one pair 1.40 metres (4 ft 7 in) diameter,

The Munnekezijlstermolen is a smock mill in Munnekezijl, Friesland, Netherlands which was built in 1856 and is in working order. The mill is listed as a Rijksmonument.

== History ==
The mill was built in 1836 for Hermannus Dijk, who was later killed in an accident in the city of Groningen. The mill was sold to the Sikkens family, and remained in their ownership until at least the mid-1990s. As well as grinding wheat, the mill was also a pearl barley mill. A whirlwind severely damaged the mill on 20 1930, blowing the sails off and damaging the stage. The pearl barley stones were removed in the 1930s. At one point, the mill was fitted with Patent sails. The mill ceased working commercially in 1961 and was threatened with demolition. However, it was decided that the price quoted was too expensive and the mill remained standing. It was restored in 1971 by millwright Doornbosch of Adorp, Groningen. The alternative name of Rust Roest was only given to the mill in the late 20th century. The mill was sold to the Stichting Erfgoed Kollumerland en Nieuwkruisland in the mid-1990s. It was restored to full working order in 1999.

== Description ==
The Munnekekezijlstermolen is what the Dutch describe as a "stellingmolen". It is a smock mill on a three-storey brick base, there is a stage at second-floor level, 6.12 metres (20 ft 1 in) above ground level. Attached to the base is the brick shed housing the auxiliary engine. The smock and cap are thatched. The mill is winded by tailpole and winch. The sails are Common sails, with the Fok system on the leading edges. They have a span of 21.40 metres (70 ft 3 in). The sails are carried on a cast-iron windshaft, which was cast in 1870 by De Prins van Oranje of The Hague, South Holland. The windshaft also carries the brake wheel, which has 59 cogs. This drives the wallower (33 cogs) at the top of the upright shaft. At the bottom of the upright shaft, the great spur wheel, which has 85 cogs. The great spur wheel drives two pairs of millstones via a lantern pinion stone nut which have 28 staves each. The millstones are 1.50 metres (4 ft 11 in) and 1.40 metres (4 ft 7 in) diameter. A third pair of 1.50 metres (4 ft 11 in) diameter millstones is driven by the auxiliary diesel engine.

== Millers ==
- Hermannus Dijk (1836)
- Sikkens family(1836-1961)

References for above:-

== Public access ==
The Munnekezijlstermolen is open to the public on Saturdays.
