= Hondsrug =

Coordinates: 52.9489°N 6.81028°E

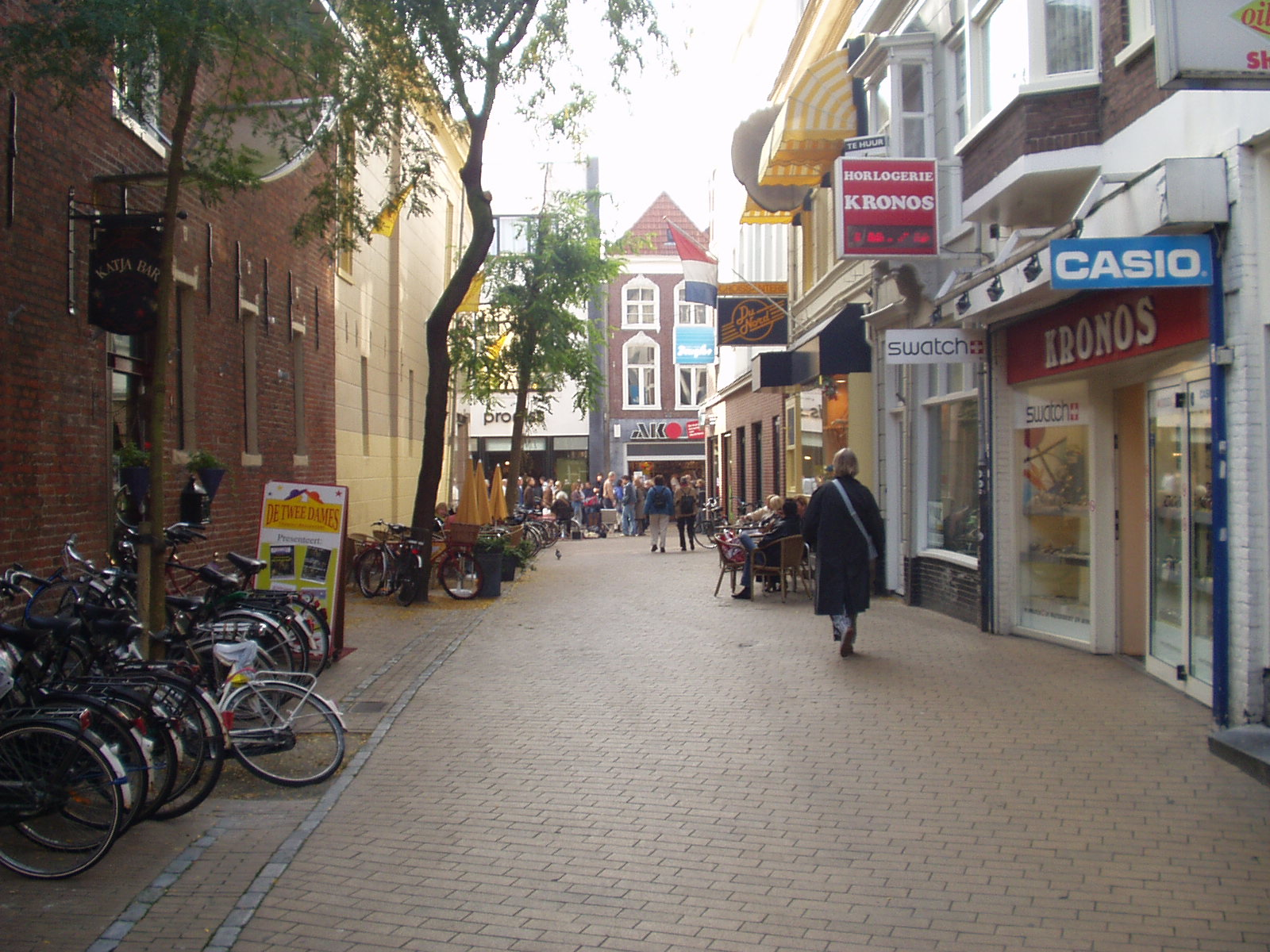
The Hoogstraatje in Groningen, the northernmost hill of the Hondsrug

Cross-section

The Hondsrug (Dutch pronunciation: [ˈɦɔntsrʏx]) is a Dutch ridge of sand that is mainly located in the province Drenthe and partly in the province Groningen.

The spur of the Hondsrug in Groningen has led to the creation of various villages build on artificial dwelling hills: Adorp, Sauwerd, Wetsinge, Winsum, Baflo, Rasquert, Warffum, Usquert, Rottum.

The name "Hondsrug" would appear to be taken from the Dutch word for "dog" or "hound" (hond) and the word for a "back" or "ridge" (rug). However, it is more likely a bastardization of the older name Hunze-rug, coming from the name of the Hunze River, which flows through Drenthe and Groningen. Until the 19th, century the Hondsrug was also known as the Bisschopsrug, meaning "Bishop's Ridge".

The Hondsung region were all created in the Saalian Ice Age. The ridge has layers of sand which were covered by boulder clay during the ice age.

The ridge has northwest–southeast orientation, which it shares with some less pronounced parallel ridges. These ridges are generally thought to be glacial landforms. It has been debated what kind of landform it should be, suggestions ranging from medial moraines to mega-flutes.

== See also ==
- Hunsrück
- Hausruckviertel
- King Willem-Alexander Canal
