= King Willem-Alexander Canal =

6 km long canal in the northeastern Netherlands

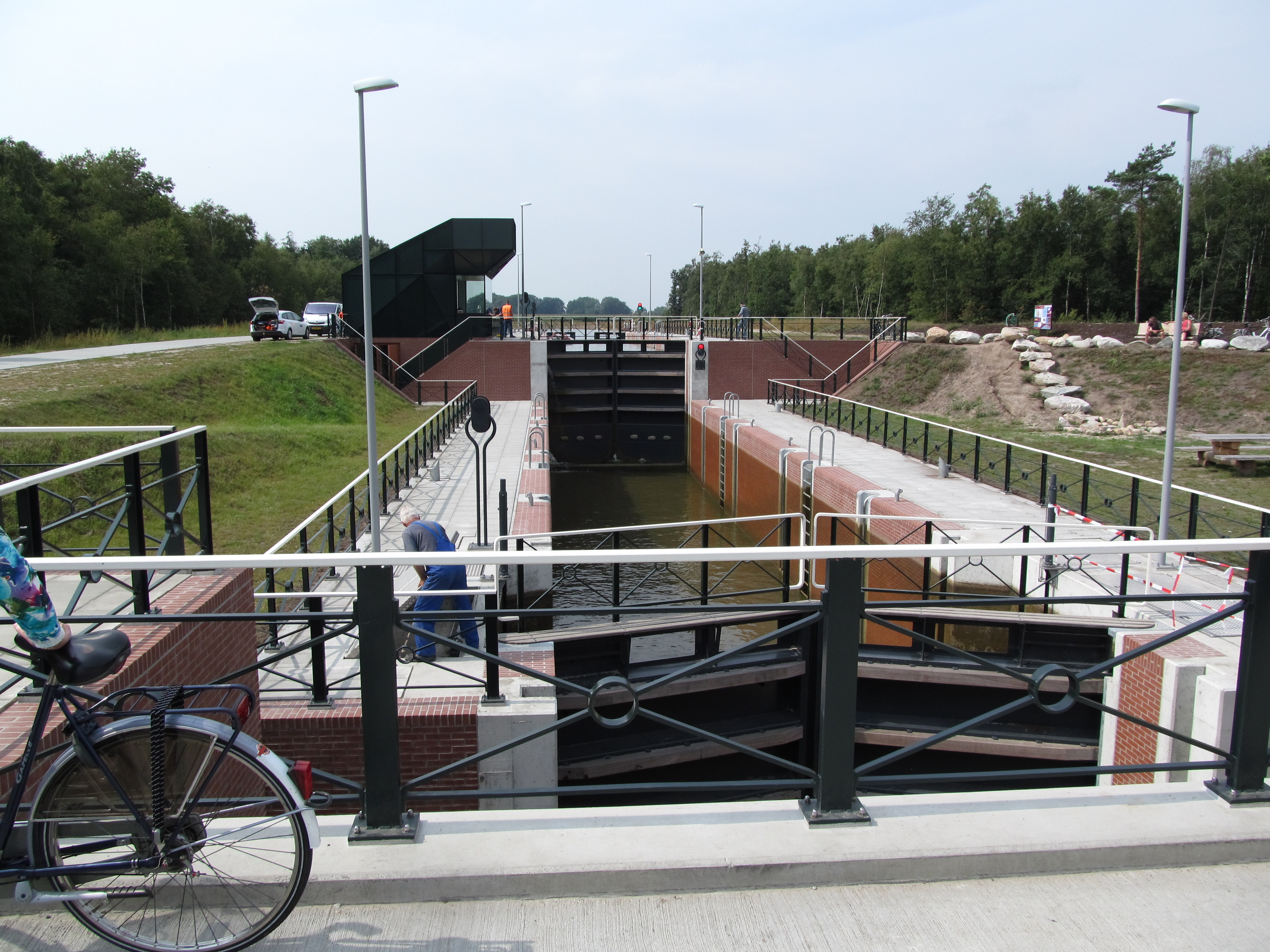
- The locks used for the canal
- Country: Netherlands

Specifications
- Length: 6 km (3.7 miles)

Geography
- Direction: Southwest
- Start point: Scholtenskanaal
- End point: Bladderswijk
- Beginning coordinates: 52.742°N 6.998°E
- Ending coordinates: 52.734°N 6.954°E

The King Willem-Alexander Canal (Dutch: Koning Willem-Alexanderkanaal), named after King Willem-Alexander of the Netherlands, is a 6 km long canal in the northeastern Netherlands. The new canal through the Hondsrug is part of the larger Veenvaart project to draw more recreational boaters and tourists to the Veenkoloniën region in the provinces of Drenthe and Groningen.

The canal was originally to be called the Veenkanaal but was renamed on 8 June 2013 in honor of recently enthroned King Willem-Alexander.
