= Nieuw-Annerveen =

Nieuw Annerveen
- Hamlet
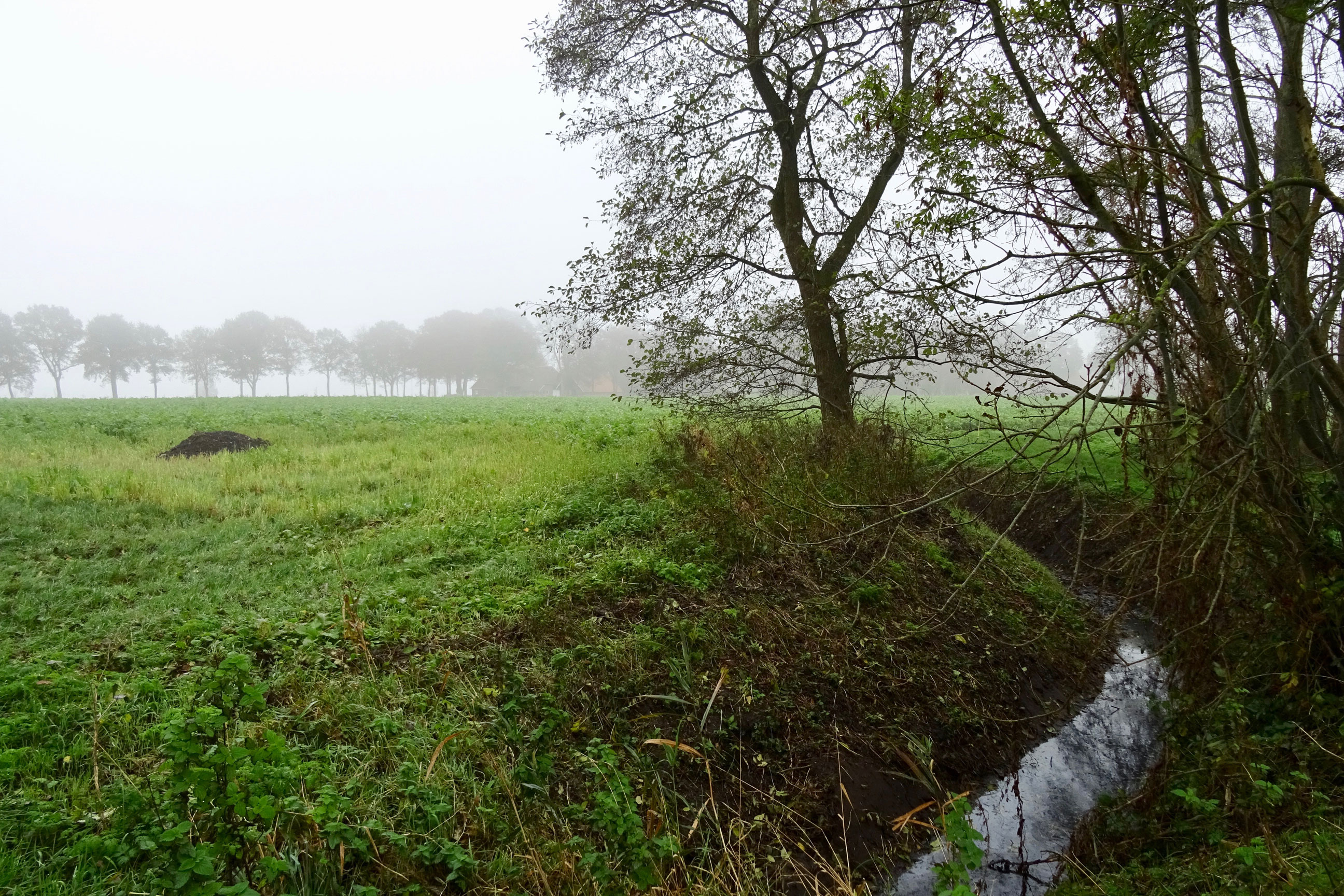
- Landscape near Nieuw-Annerveen

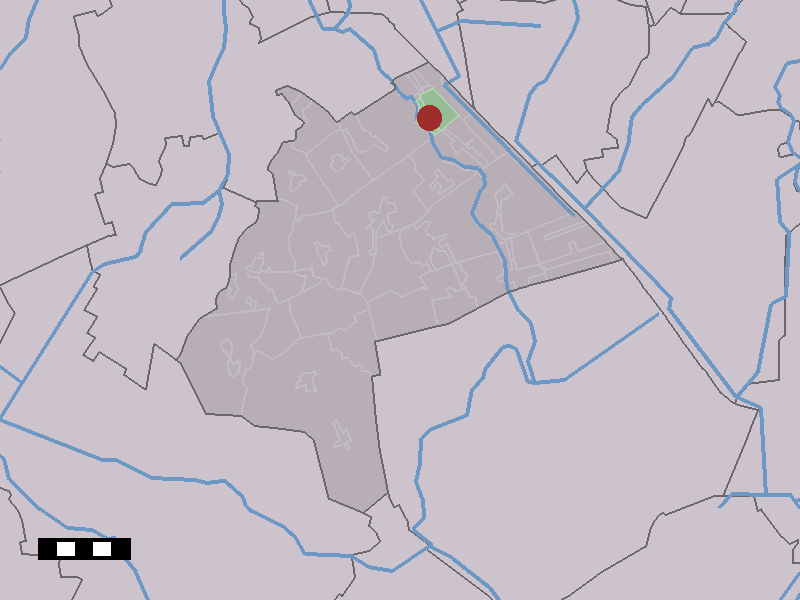
- The village (dark red) and the statistical district (light green) of Nieuw-Annerveen in the municipality of Aa en Hunze.

- Location in the Netherlands Nieuw Annerveen (Netherlands)
- Coordinates: 53°3′56″N 6°46′34″E
- Country: Netherlands
- Province: Drenthe
- Municipality: Aa en Hunze

Area
  - Total: 3.67 km^{2} (1.42 sq mi)
- Elevation: 2.3 m (7.5 ft)

Population (2021)
  - Total: 115
  - Density: 31.3/km^{2} (81.2/sq mi)
- Time zone: UTC+1 (CET)
  - Summer (DST): UTC+2 (CEST)
- Postal code: 9657
- Dialing code: 0598

Nieuw-Annerveen (Dutch pronunciation: [ˌniuˈɑnərveːn]) is a hamlet in the Dutch province of Drenthe. It is a part of the municipality of Aa en Hunze, and lies about 16 km east of Assen.

The hamlet was first mentioned in 1874 as Annerveen (Nieuw). It uses Nieuw (new) to distinguish between Oud-Annerveen. The former school is nowadays used as a village house.
