= Zuidlaardermeer =

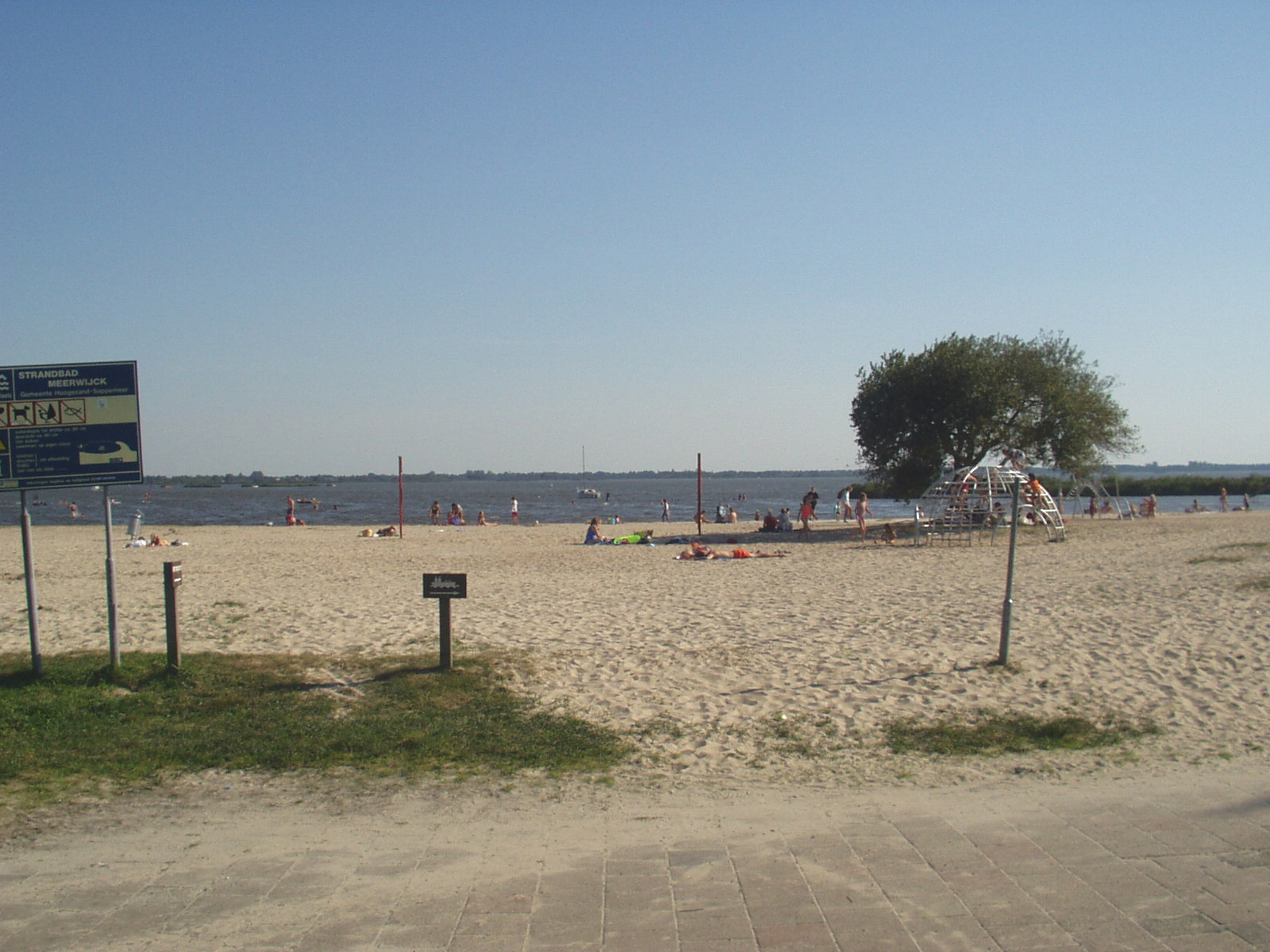
- Beach near Meerwijck

- Location within Netherlands
- Location: Netherlands
- Coordinates: 53°08′N 6°42′E
- Primary inflows: Hunze
- Primary outflows: Drentsche Diep
- Basin countries: Netherlands
- Surface area: 540 ha (1,300 acres)
- Average depth: 1 m (3 ft 3 in)
- Max. depth: 4 m (13 ft)

Ramsar Wetland
- Official name: Zuidlaardermeergebied
- Designated: 29 August 2000
- Reference no.: 1282

Zuidlaardermeer is a lake in the northern part of the Netherlands.

The lake runs Northwest of the village of Zuidlaren and southwards of the former municipality of Hoogezand-Sappemeer and is called Zuidlaardermeer (Dutch for: Lake of Zuidlaren). The lake is largely situated in the provinces of Groningen and Drenthe. It was formed 5,000-8,000 years ago. The lake is fed by the river Hunze. This river enters the lake in the south-east and exits the lake in the north as Drentsche Diep.

The lake is shallow (about 1 m deep), but some parts are deeper, like the fairway. The lake is popular with tourists, but in particular with yachtsmen. Many sailboats are moored in the lake, because the Zuidlaardermeer is one of the few suitable lakes for sailing in the region.

Large parts of the lake and nearby polders are conducted by the Groninger Zeeschap foundation.

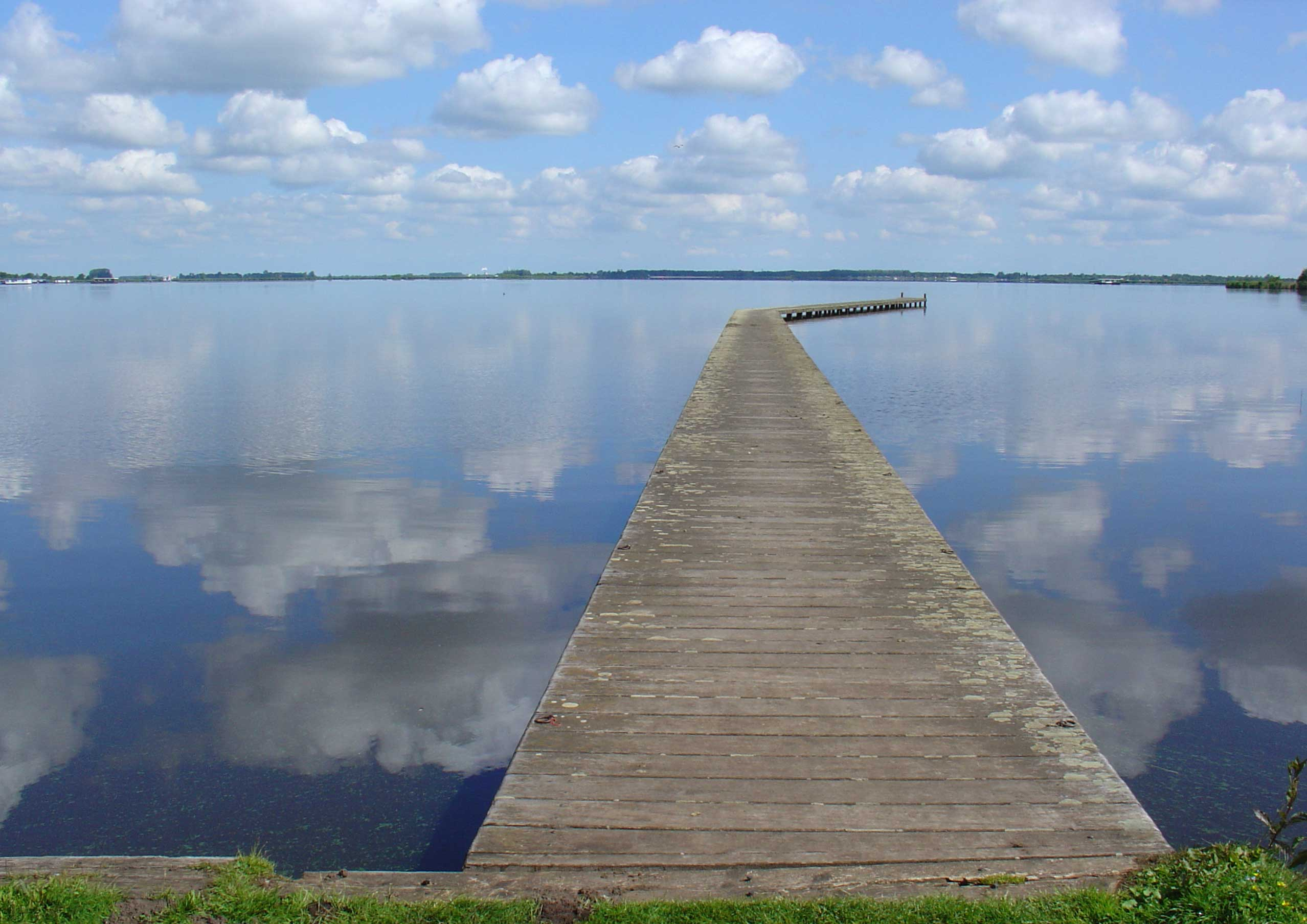
Zuidlaardermeer

== See also ==
- Hunze
