= Munnekezijl =

Munnekezijl Muntsjesyl
- Village
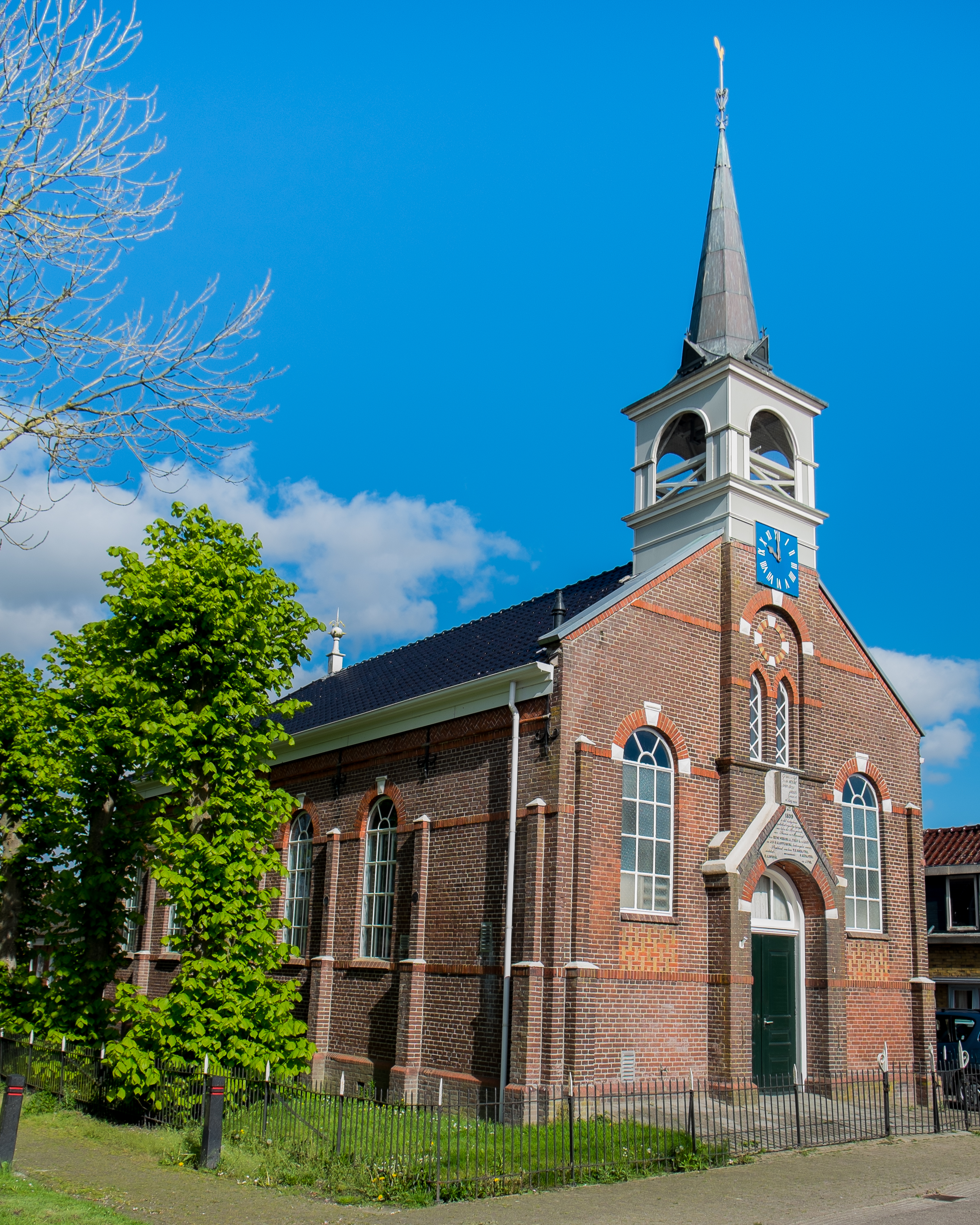
- The Dutch Reformed church of Munnekezijl

- Flag Coat of arms

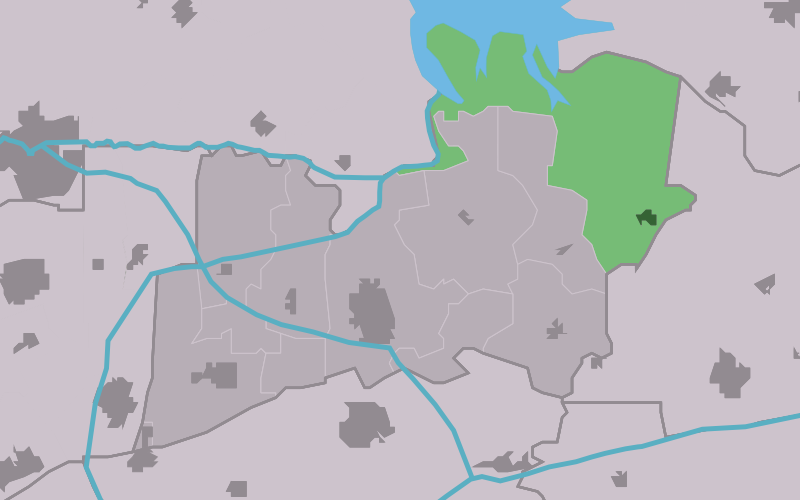
- Location in the former Kollumerland municipality

- Location in the Netherlands Munnekezijl (Netherlands)
- Country: Netherlands
- Province: Friesland
- Municipality: Noardeast-Fryslân

Area
  - Total: 25.85 km^{2} (9.98 sq mi)
- Elevation: 0.6 m (2.0 ft)

Population (2021)
  - Total: 500
  - Density: 19/km^{2} (50/sq mi)
- Time zone: UTC+1 (CET)
  - Summer (DST): UTC+2 (CEST)
- Postal code: 9853
- Dialing code: 0594

Munnekezijl (West Frisian: Muntsjesyl; Gronings: Muntjesiel) is the easternmost village in Noardeast-Fryslân, Friesland, the Netherlands. It had a population of 488 in January 2017. Before 2019, the village was part of the Kollumerland en Nieuwkruisland municipality.

There is a windmill in the village, the Munnekezijlstermolen.

== History ==
The village was first mentioned in 1510 as Monicken nyem szyl, and means "sluice of the monks" which is referenced to the monastery of Gerkesklooster who built a sluice at the location around 1450. In 1476, the sluice was damaged by the citizens of Achtkarspelen. In 1539, the sluice was moved further to the east, and in 1585, a sconce was built near the sluice. The current sluice dates from 1741.

The Dutch Reformed church was built in 1899 to replace its 17th century predecessor. In 1840, Munnekezijl was home to 333 people. The grist mill Munnekezijlstermolen dates from 1856. It was restored between 1970 and 1971, and as of 2017, in service again.

== Gallery ==
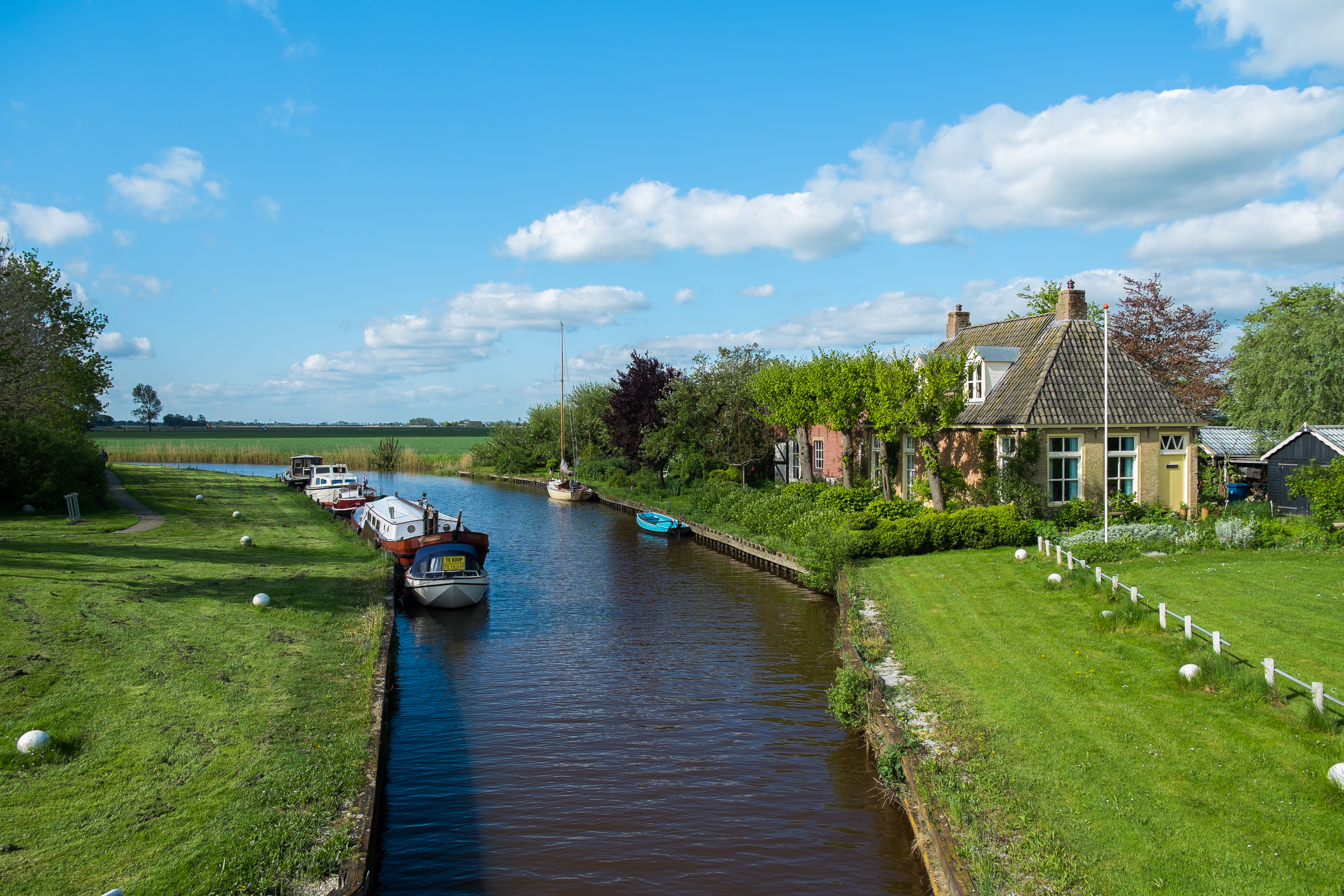
View of the Lauwers River

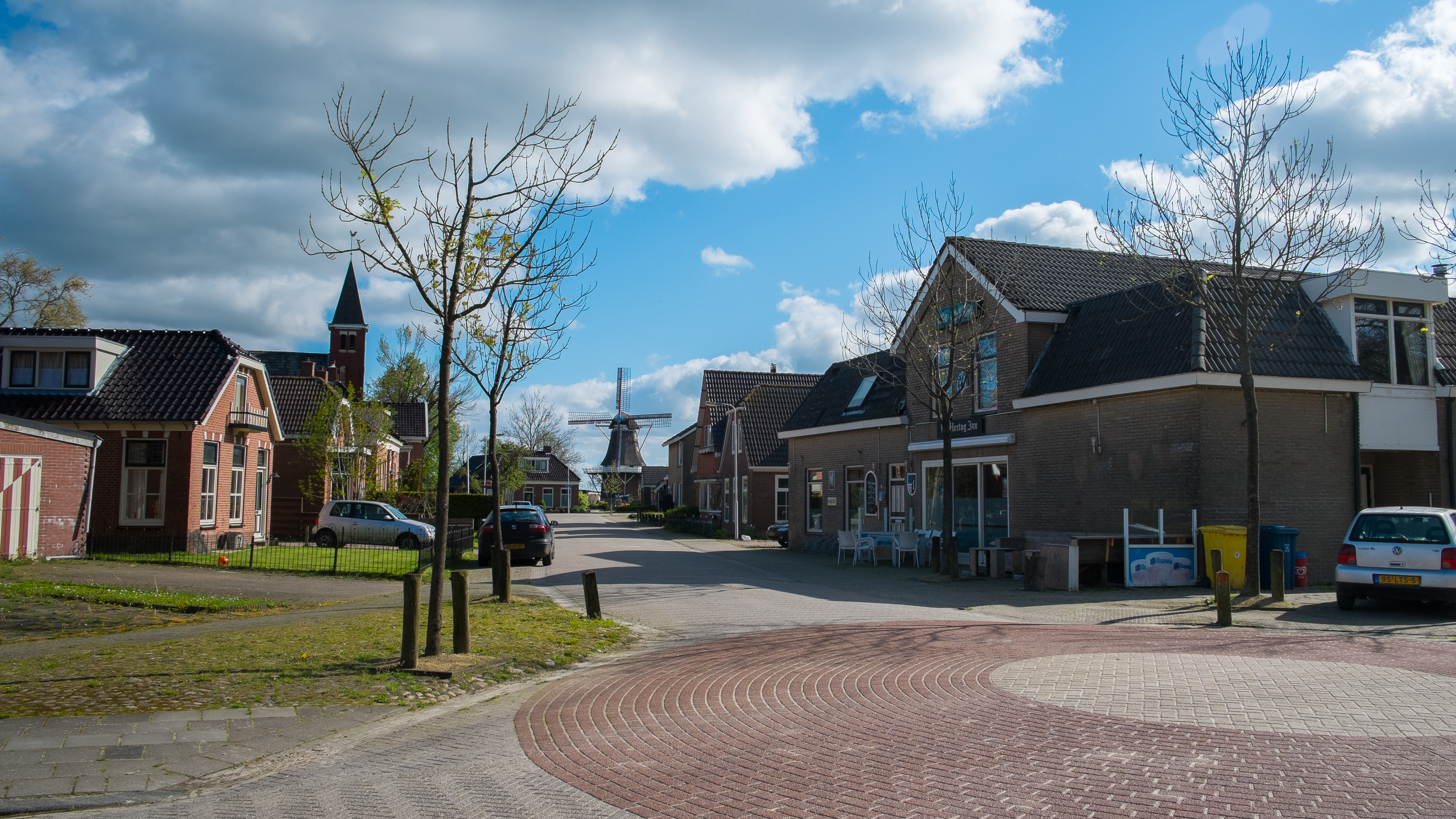
Village street

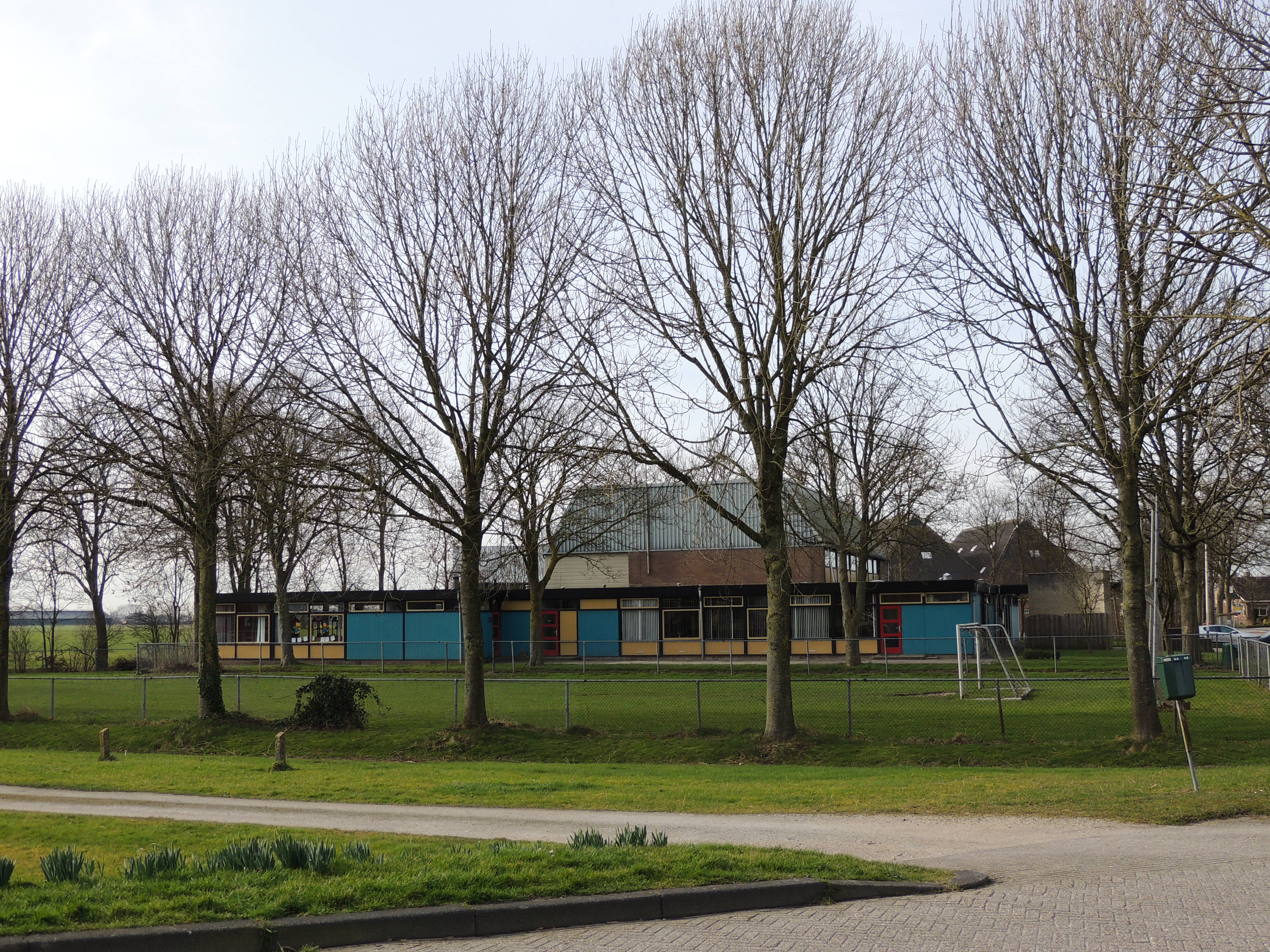
Village house De Skâns

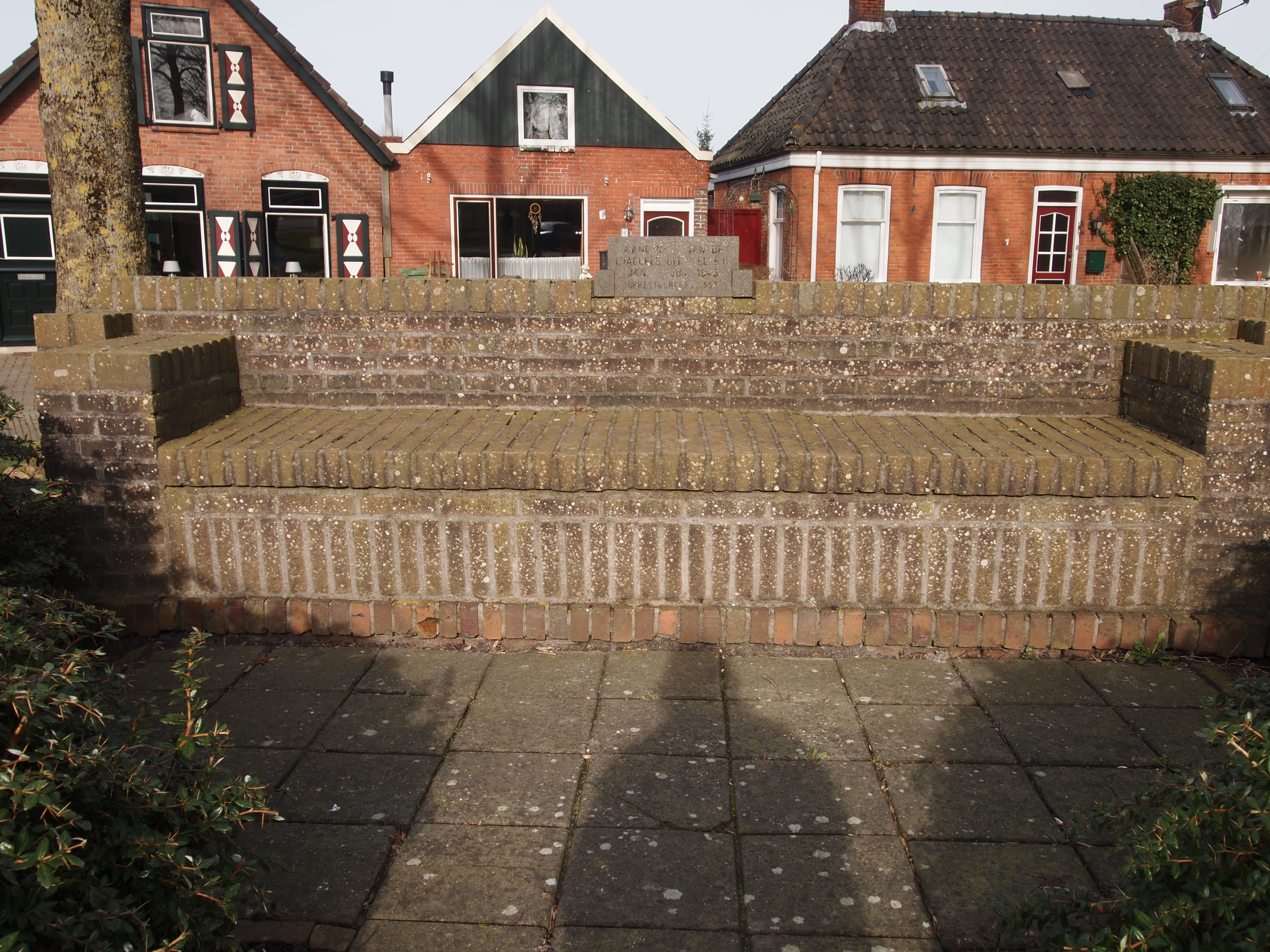
War memorial
