= Hunze =

River in the Netherlands

Coordinates: 53°11′01″N 6°39′18″E

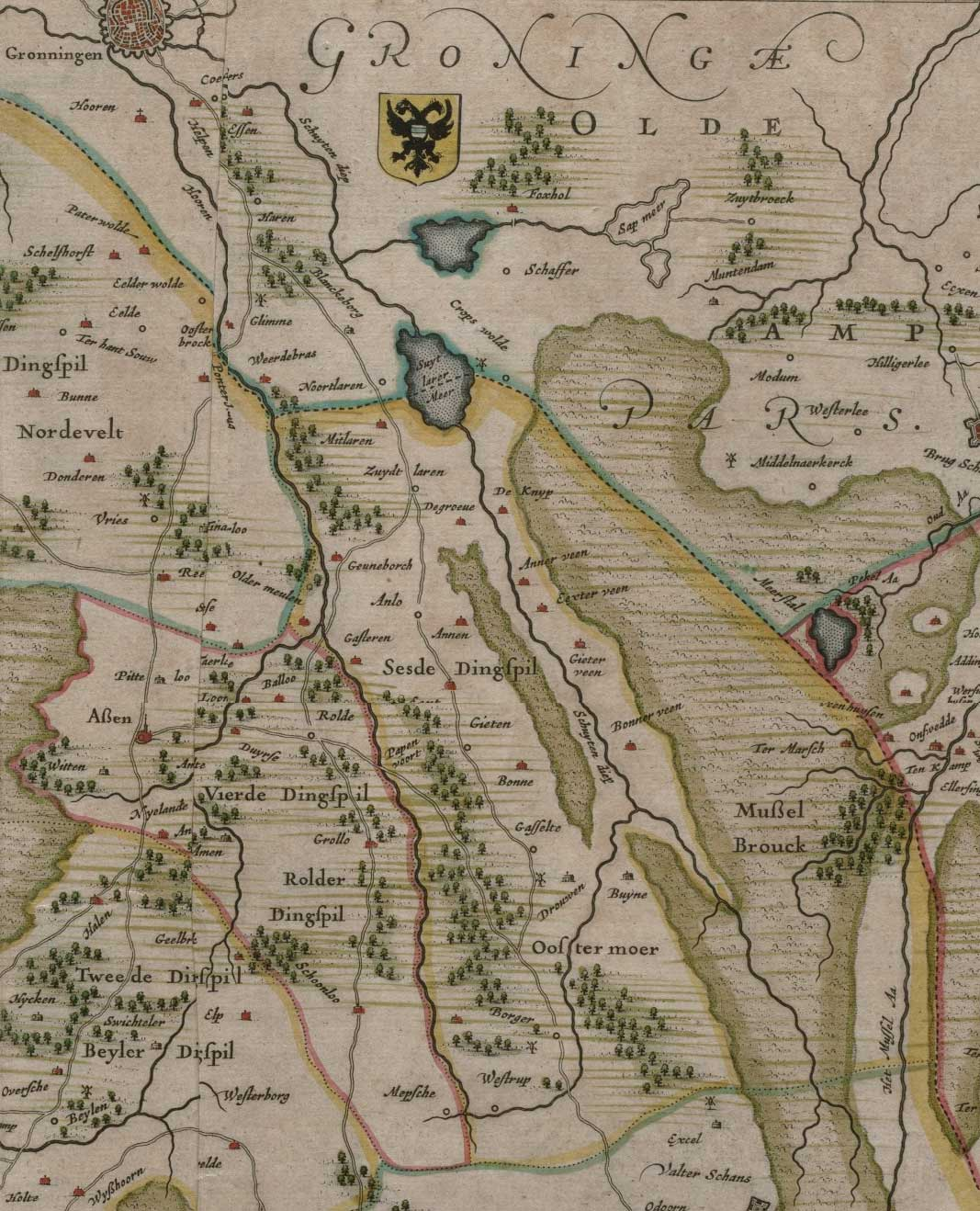
- The Hunze on the 1634 map of Drenthe by Cornelis Pijnacker - called Schuyten diep on this map

Location
- Country: Netherlands

The Hunze (also known as Oostermoerse Vaart, Oostermoersche Vaart, Drentsche Diep, and Schuyten diep) is a river located in the border area of Drenthe and Groningen, east of the Hondsrug, in the Netherlands. The Hunze used to run through to the Wadden Sea, first at Pieterburen and later at Zoutkamp, via the Lauwerszee.

The name means "marsh or mud (stream)". The name of the area, Hunsingo, refers to this river, which originally flowed into the Wadden Sea.

== Origin ==
The Hunze valley probably formed in the Saale Glaciation (the penultimate ice age; 236,000 to 124,000 B.C.) during the last phase of the hif period, when the ice flow of the land ice changed direction from northeast-southwest to northwest-southeast. Possibly the cutout was caused by an ice lobe. It was previously thought that this occurred later and that the valley was created by meltwater runoff. However, the presence of depressions and the steep straight boundary on the west side of the Hunze Valley make this illogical. Later, the valley did serve to drain meltwater. The valley originally had a width of 15 kilometers and a depth of 50 meters. During the Saalian and subsequent periods, including the Eemian (until 114,000 BC; an interglacial period) and the Weichselian (until 9,700 BC), a significant portion of the valley was predominantly filled with sand. The Eemian (between 124,000 and 114,000 B.C.) is seen as the period when probably either the river system of the Hunze (main stream with supplying tributary streams) was formed or the time when a swamp (fed by streams) arose on the site of the Hunze. However, evidence for this is as yet lacking. Over time, the river was reduced to a stream valley no more than a few kilometers wide. In the 14th century, the northern arm towards Hiddingezijl was diked off and only the western arm remained, which in the course of time was excavated to become the Reitdiep. Particularly on the east side of the city of Groningen, parts were excavated to realize a better drainage and waterborne transport. From the middle of the 18th century on, the valley was further narrowed by land reclamation. In the 20th century, the water was canalized in many places by cutting off meanders and digging sections. At the beginning of the 21st century, parts were transformed into nature reserves, with plans to partially remold the Hunze.

=== Gallery ===
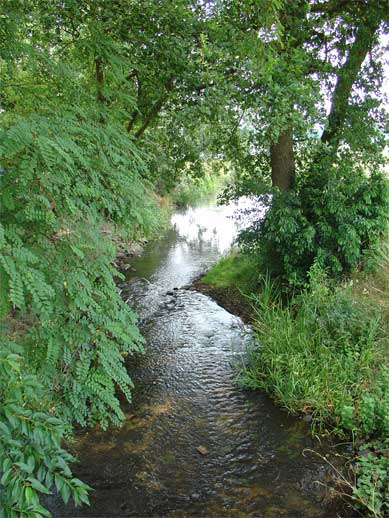
Voorste Diep near Bronneger (2006)

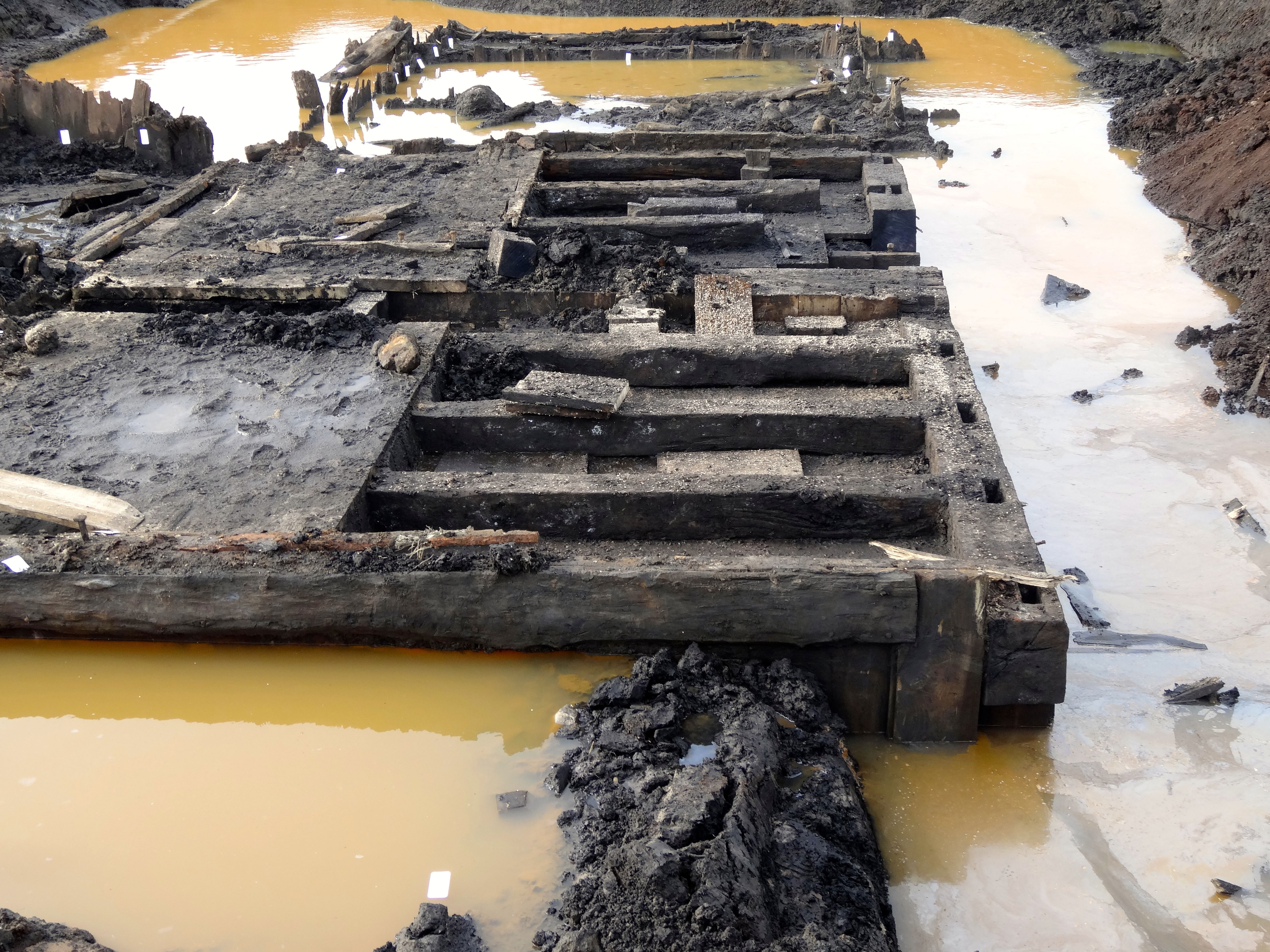
Remains of an old floodgate in De Hunze near De Hilte (Tjassensverlaat)

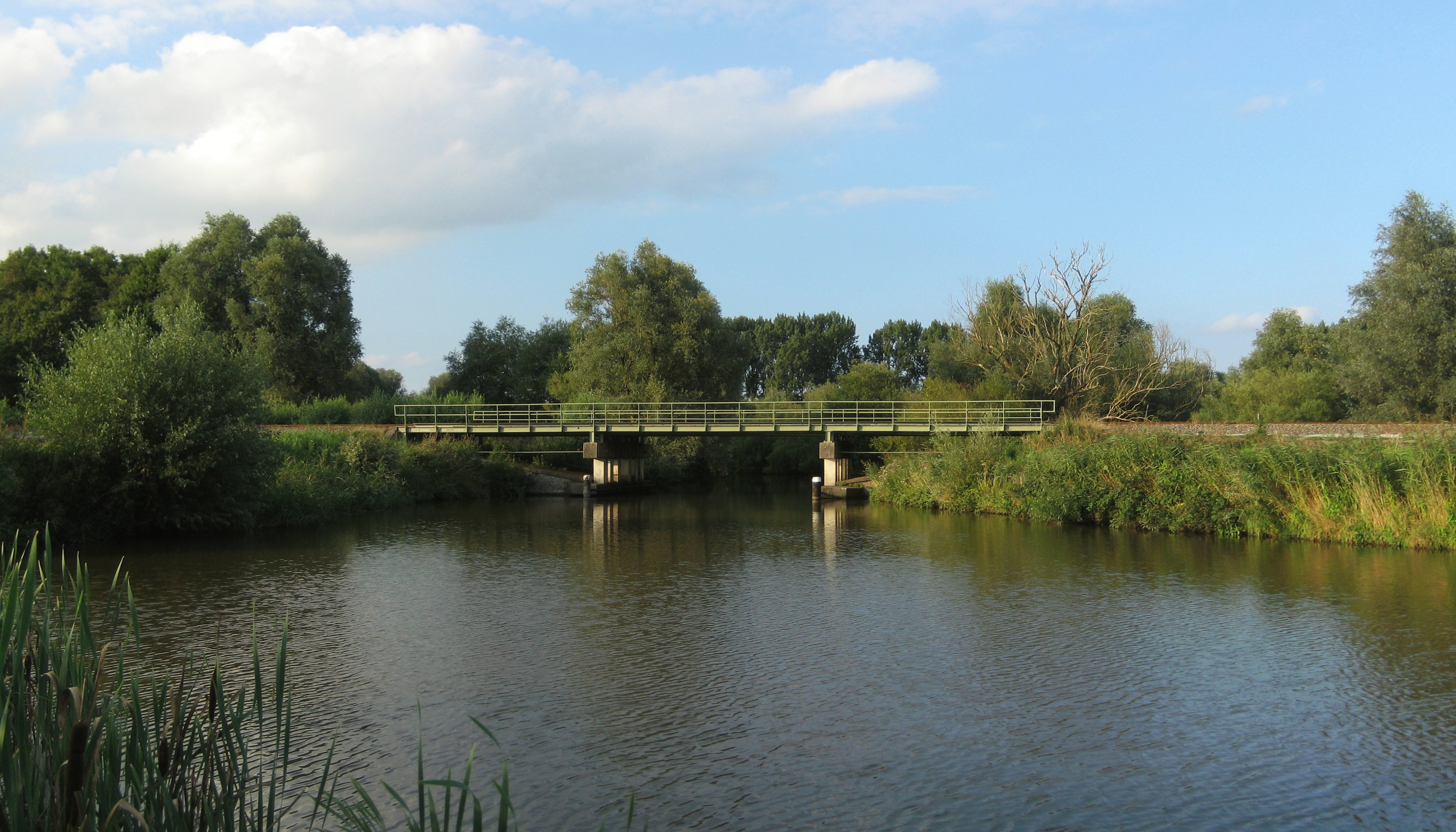
Railroad bridge over the Drentsche Diep near Waterhuizen (2013)

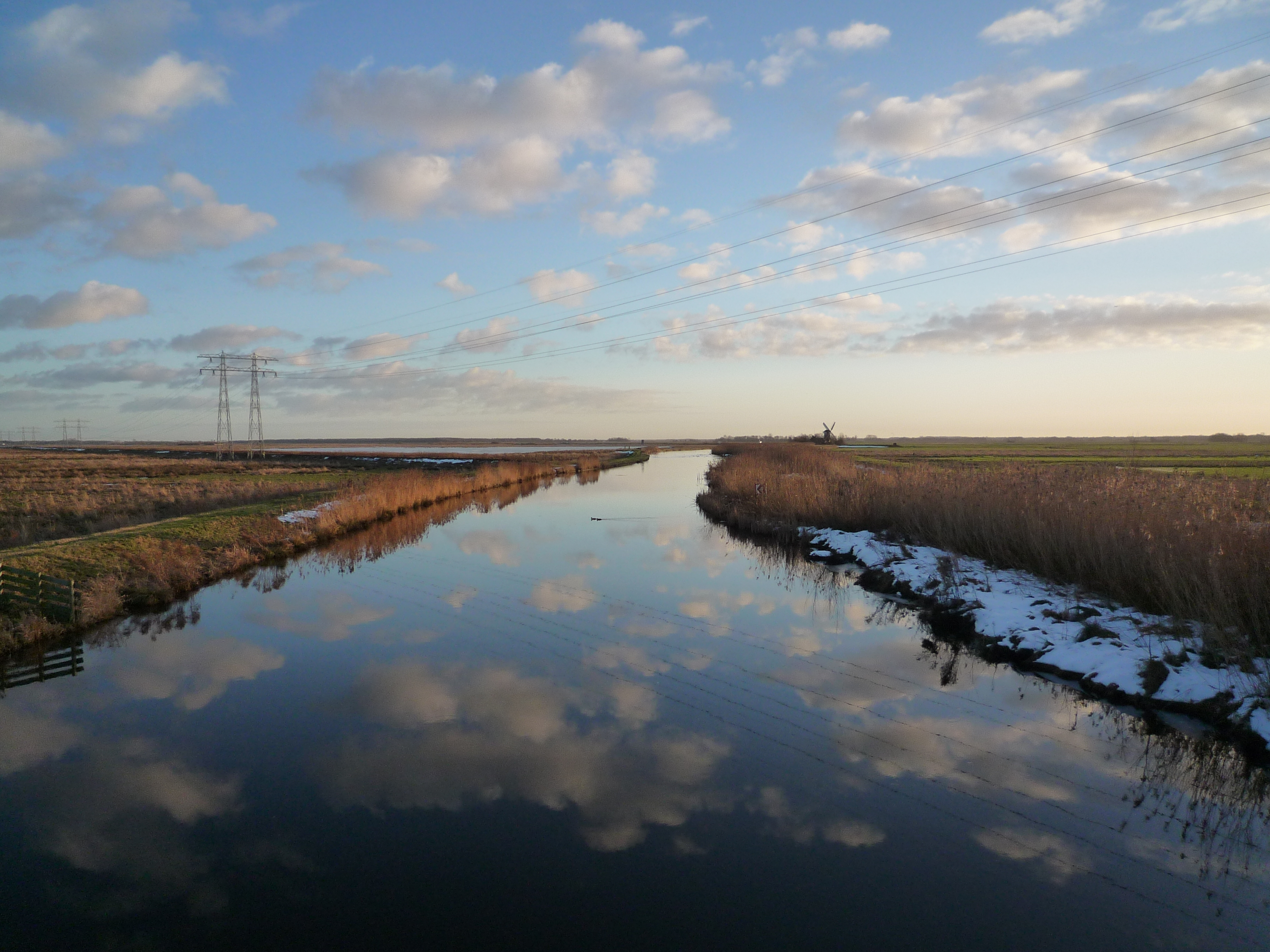
Drentsche Diep seen from the Polderpad with polder mill De Biks in the background

== Course ==
The Hunze begins east of Gasselte and west of Drouwenerveen, where the Voorste and Achterste Diepje meet. The Voorste Diep is one of the water gaps that cut through the Hondsrug. From that point to the Zuidlaardermeer, it is also referred to as the Oostermoerschevaart, named after the Oostermoer dike. The term 'moer' indicates marsh and fen. West of the Zuidlaarderdiep, the Hunze used to be connected to the Drentsche Aa through a valley that cut through the Besloten Venen.

Originally, the river meandered through this swampy area. This marshy terrain is the reason why there is actually no location in Drenthe that directly borders the old Hunzeboezem, even though the small river near Gasselternijveen and Spijkerboor comes very close to both villages. This proximity is likely the result of rerouting and straightening the original meanders near these villages.

At Meerwijck, where the Hunze exits the north side of the Zuidlaardermeer, there is a bicycle and foot ferry. From this point onward, the river is known as the Drentsche Diep, flowing through the Westerbroekstermadepolder nature reserve, as it crosses from the province of Drenthe into the province of Groningen. It ultimately joins the Winschoterdiep at Waterhuizen.

== Historical watercourses ==
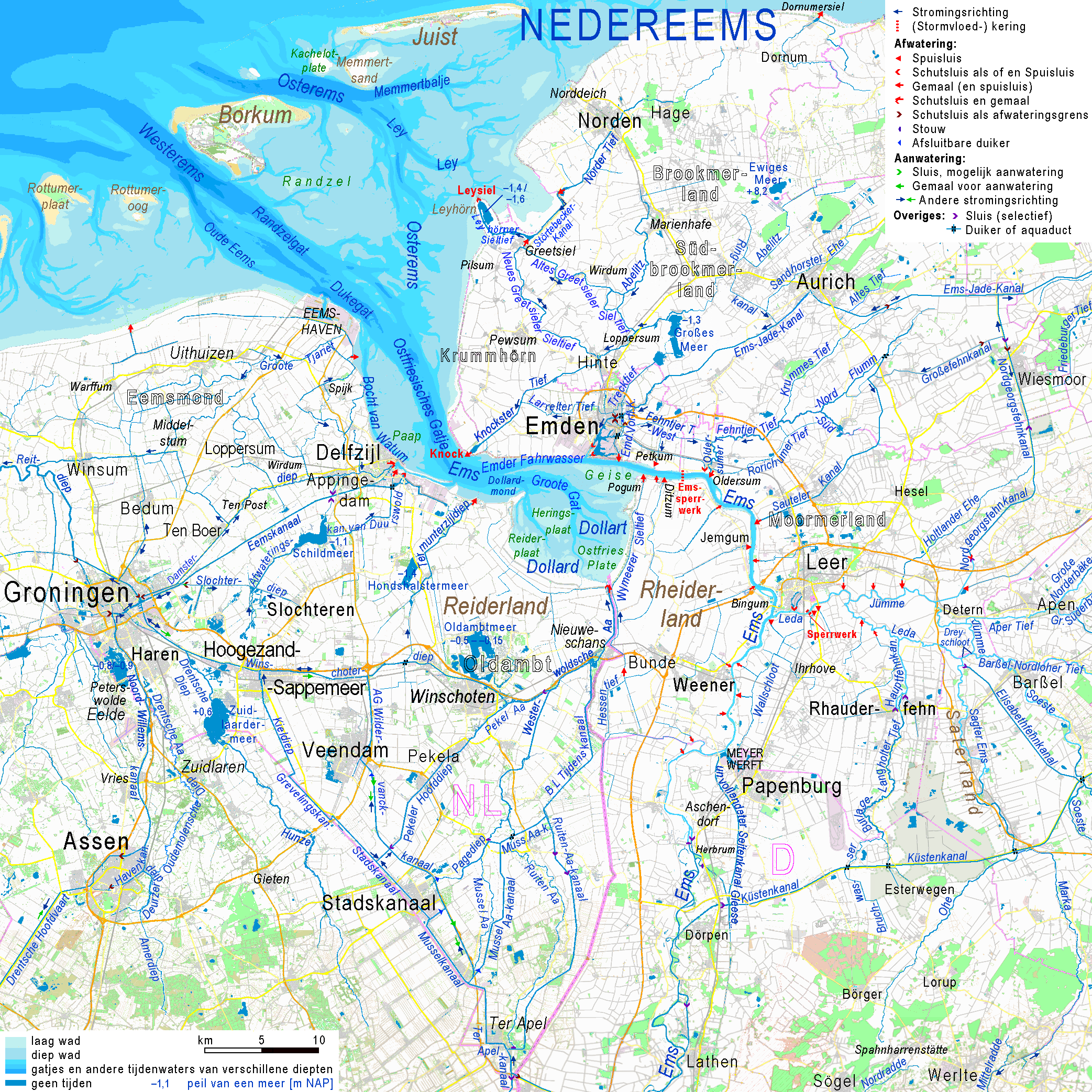
Hunze, Drentsche Aa, Winschoterdiep and Eems Canal in the system of the Nedereems

Between the Winschoterdiep and the Damsterdiep, the river had silted up significantly, making it difficult to recognize it as such. North of the (old) city of Groningen, the Hunze is called the Selwerderdiepje.

From Wierumerschouw, the Reitdiep, starting in the mid-17th century, became the largely straightened lower course of the Hunze. The section from Groningen to Wierumerschouw is the excavated lower course of the Drentsche Aa.

Around the year 1400, the Hunze was dammed at Roodehaan and redirected through the newly dug Schuitendiep to Groningen. A portion of it was later used for the dug Winschoterdiep. This gave the city direct access to the peat areas in East Groningen, enabling it to control the turf trade. The extension of the Schuitendiep within the city is appropriately named Turfsingel, the storage place for peat.

On aerial photos and in certain areas of the landscape, the old river valley can still be recognized. The river flowed from Waterhuizen to Oosterhoogebrug and can still be traced, for instance, near Oude Roodehaan. In the city of Groningen, two large bends of the old course are still discernible between Ooster- and Noorderhoogebrug. Structures are also still found on the eastern side of the Selwerderhof cemetery. North of the Van Starkenborgh Canal, the contours of the clay area around Adorp are still visible. From there, the river meandered northward, and the old meanders can still be identified, such as the bocht van Hekkum (bend of Hekkum) and the Oude Diepje (Old Deep). At the later Schouwerzijl, the river split into a northern branch (see: Kromme Raken) which flowed into the Wadden Sea near Pieterburen and a western branch (later part of the Reitdiep) which flowed into the Lauwerszee near Zoutkamp.

== Hunze Vision ==
In 1995, the Groninger landscape, the Drentse landscape, and the Worldwide Fund for Nature (WWF) developed the plan, Hunzevisie, with the aim of restoring nature in the Hunze Valley and reconstructing the original river course as much as possible.

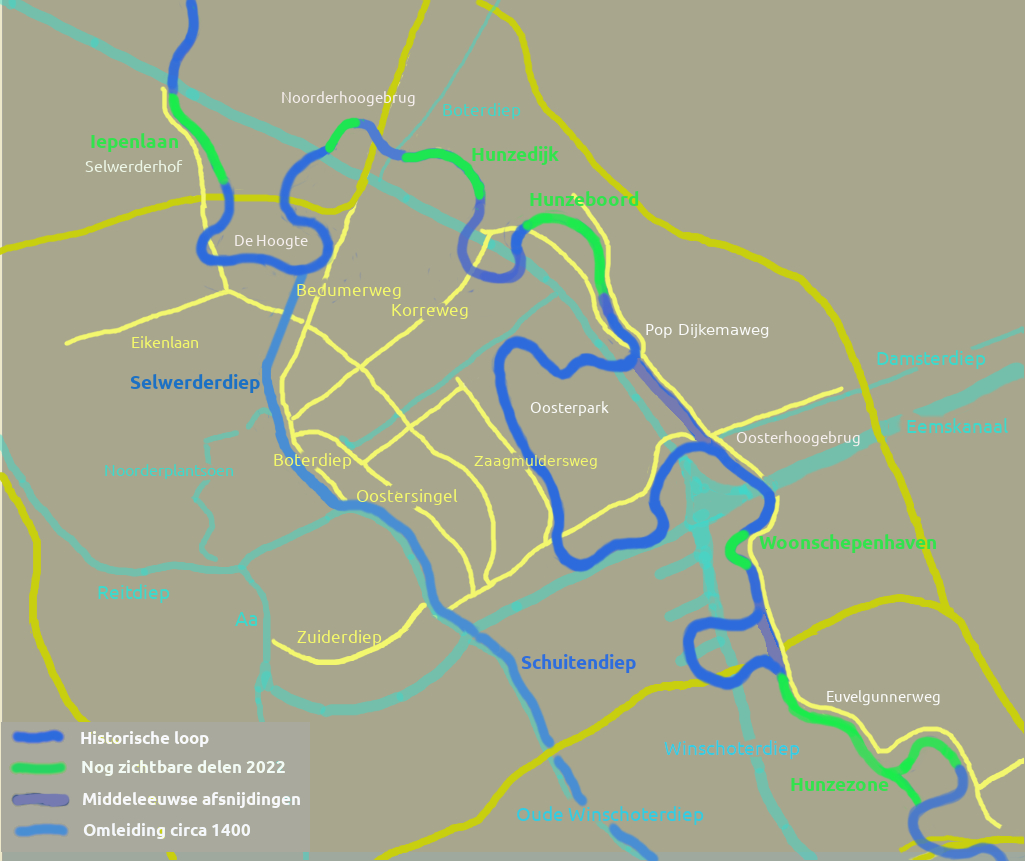
Historic course of the Hunze River around the city of Groningen

The province of Drenthe and the municipalities of Aa en Hunze, Borger-Odoorn, and Tynaarlo are jointly restoring the old meanders of the Hunze in the Drenthe part of the small river. During this work, the remains of an old floodgate were found near the hamlet of De Hilte in October 2014.

In Groningen, examples of realized nature reserves include the Kropswolderbuitenpolder and the Westerbroekstermadepolder north of the Zuidlaardermeer. Additionally, on both sides of the Euvelgunnerweg, thanks in part to the late farmer Thies Dijkhuis, the Hunzezone has been established as a green area between two industrial zones, preserving the existing Hunzeloop.

In 2014, Hunzevisie (Hunzevision) 2030 was presented. This plan also expressed the ambition to allow the Hunze to flow back into the Wadden Sea.

In 2023, the municipality of Groningen also presented a Hunze Vision, aligning with the desire of other parties to restore the river's connection to the Wadden Sea. Groningen envisions a series of projects spanning a total of 30 years. The intention is for anyone wishing to develop or build in the Hunze area to incorporate river restoration into their plans.

== Related names ==
- The municipality of Aa en Hunze derives its name from the two rivers that flow through the region, namely the Hunze and the Drentsche Aa.
- KGR De Hunze is the name of a civic rowing club located in the center of the city of Groningen, founded on February 19, 1886. Its full name is Koninklijke Groninger Roeivereniging De Hunze.
- De Hunze is also the name of a district in the city of Groningen that developed in the northeastern part of the city starting in 1989.
- For many years, the Hunze power station, characterized by its five pipes, stood approximately where the current FC Groningen stadium, Euroborg, is located. It was one of Groningen's iconic buildings and rivaled the Martinitoren in prominence.
- The Hunsingo region
- Hunze and Aa's Water Board
