= Winschoterdiep =

Canal in Groningen, Netherlands

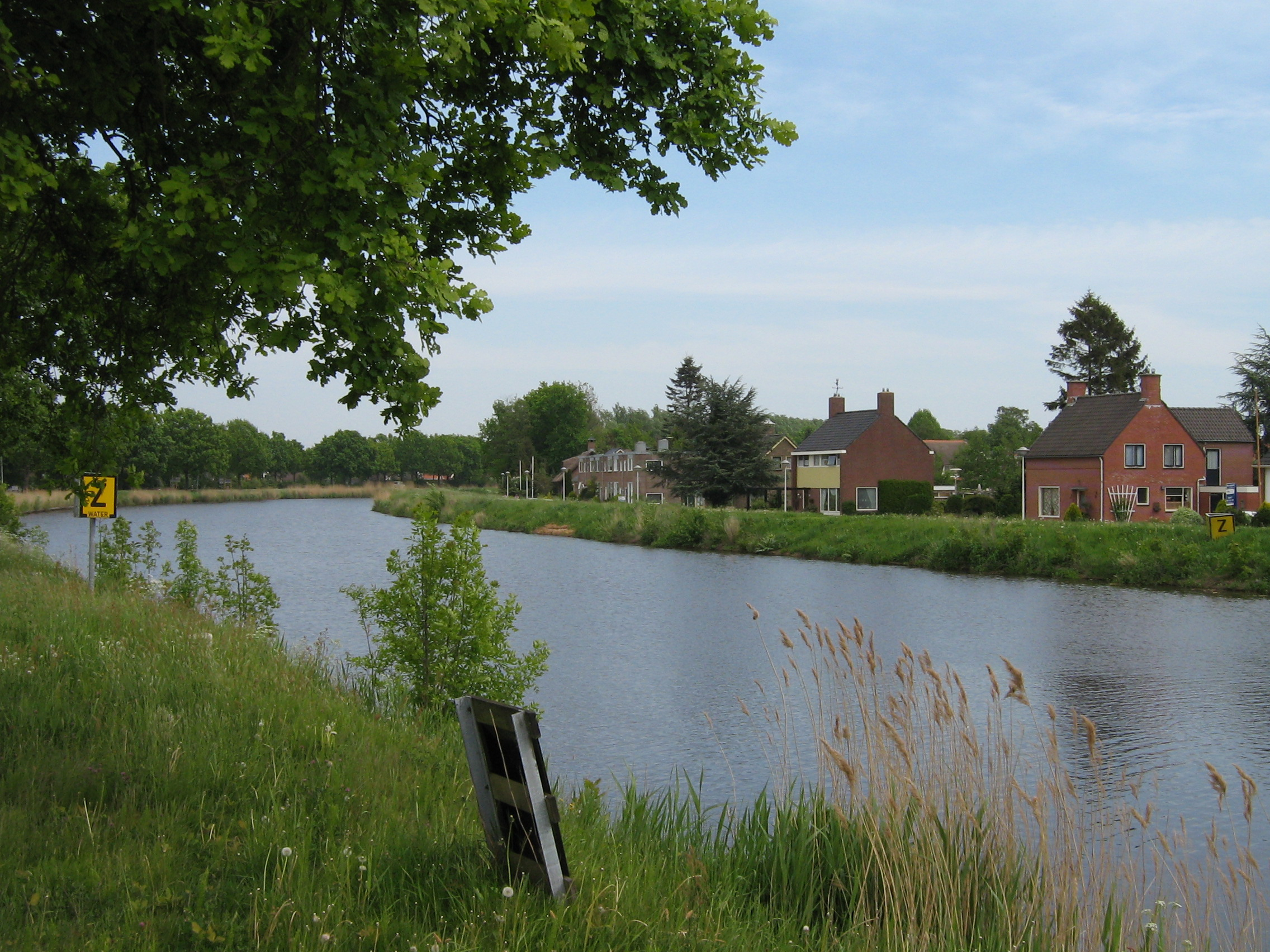
- The canal in Scheemda
- Country: Netherlands

Specifications
- Length: 35.5 km (22.1 miles)

Geography
- Direction: East
- Start point: Groningen
- End point: Winschoten
- Beginning coordinates: 53°13′16″N 6°35′48″E
- Ending coordinates: 53°08′48″N 7°04′14″E

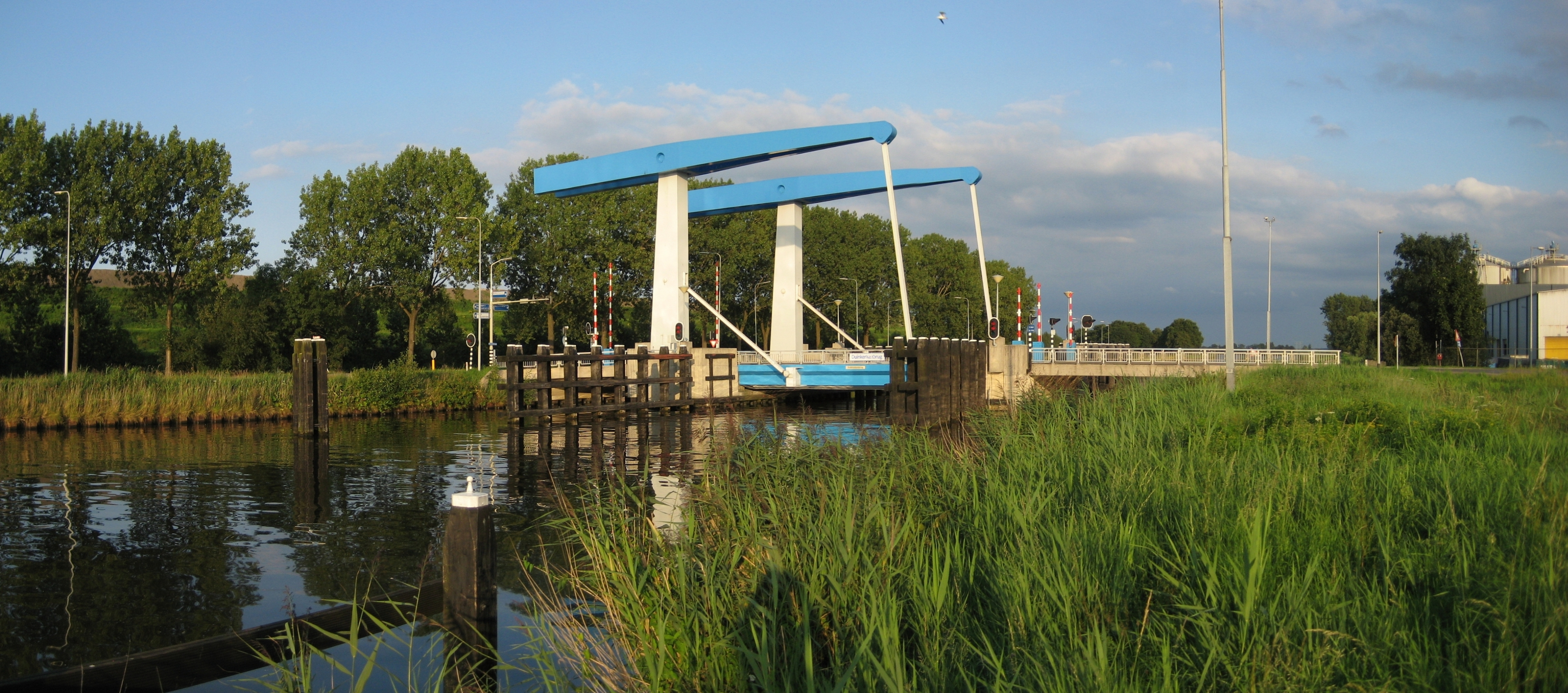
The Winschoterdiep in Groningen (2009)

The Winschoterdiep (Dutch pronunciation: [ˌʋɪnsxoːtərˈdip]) is a canal in the province Groningen of the Netherlands. It leads to the Rensel, which is actually part of this canal. Construction was started in 1618 and finished in 1634. The Winschoterdiep's total length is 35.5 kilometres, and it is approximately 100 metres in width. Sixteen bridges and locks are built across this canal, as well as many other passages. Ships must be less than 16 m in breadth to pass through some of these. It is one of the oldest canals ever built in Groningen still in use. In the section between Hoogezand and Waterhuizen, there are several shipwharfs. Hoogezand was founded near the canal in 1618.

Where the canal runs through the municipality of Menterwolde, there is significant water-sport activity in season.
