= Spijkerboor, Drenthe =

Spijkerboor
- Village
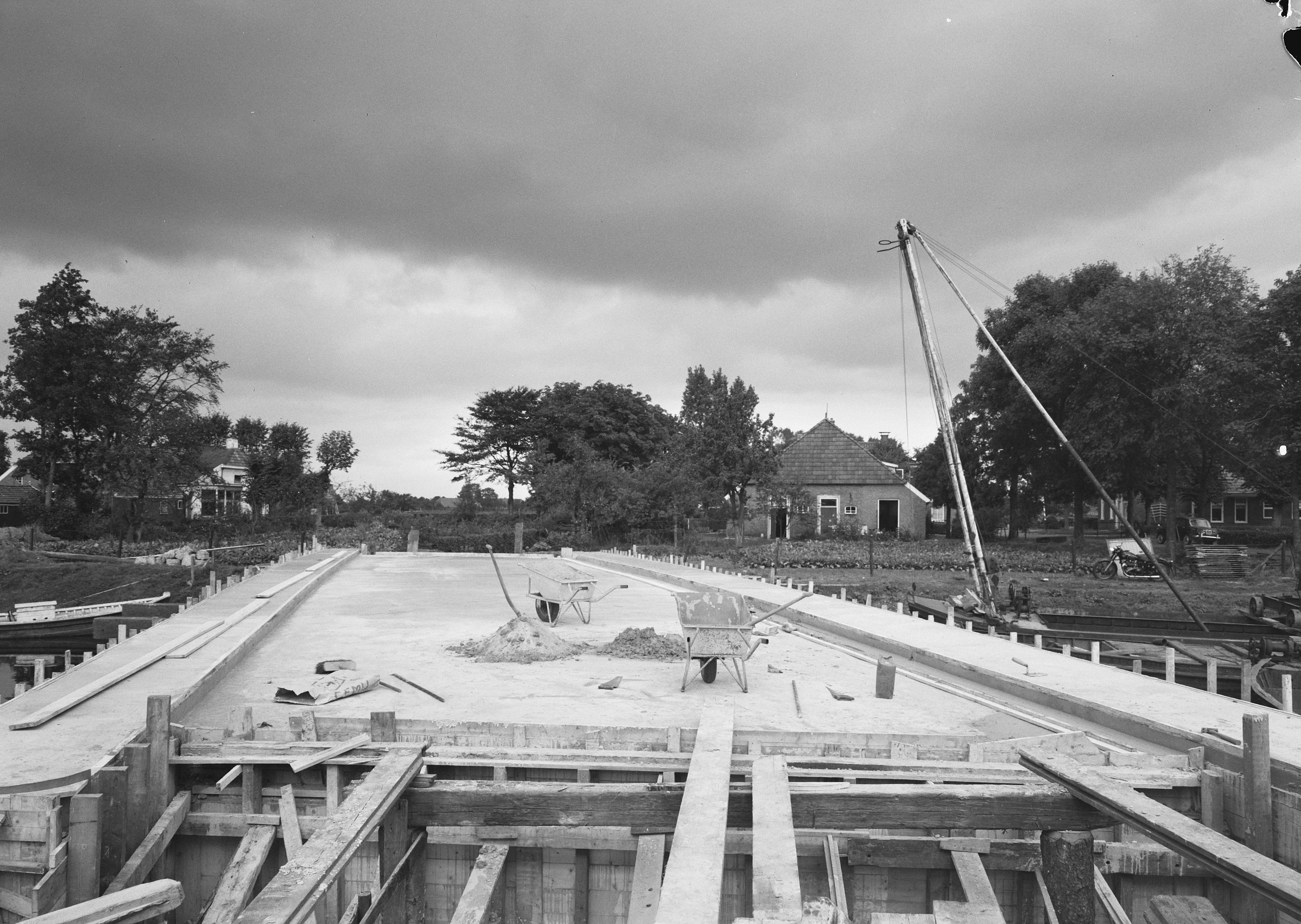
- Building a bridge in Spijkerboor

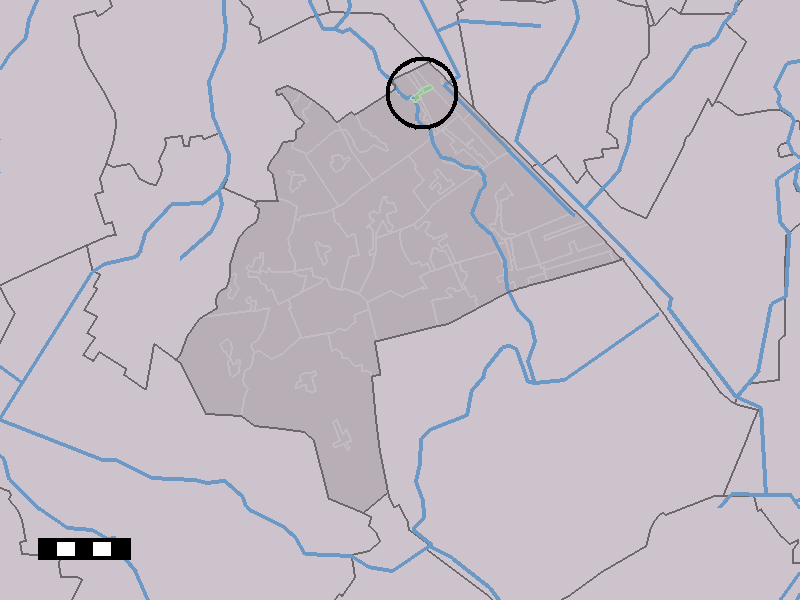
- Spijkerboor in the municipality of Aa en Hunze.

- Location in the Netherlands Spijkerboor (Netherlands)
- Coordinates: 53°4′35″N 6°45′49″E
- Country: Netherlands
- Province: Drenthe
- Municipality: Aa en Hunze

Area
  - Total: 0.38 km^{2} (0.15 sq mi)
- Elevation: 1.8 m (5.9 ft)

Population (2021)
  - Total: 155
  - Density: 410/km^{2} (1,100/sq mi)
- Time zone: UTC+1 (CET)
  - Summer (DST): UTC+2 (CEST)
- Postal code: 9656
- Dialing code: 0598

Spijkerboor is a village in the Dutch province of Drenthe. It is a part of the municipality of Aa en Hunze, and lies about 16 km northeast of Assen.

The village was first mentioned in 1792 as "de Spykerboor", and means meandering river. Before the Stadskanaal was dug, all the peat in the area had to be transported over the Hunze river. Spijkerboor was located at one of the locks in the river where you had to pay toll.
