= Adorp =

Adorp Oadörp (Gronings)
- Village
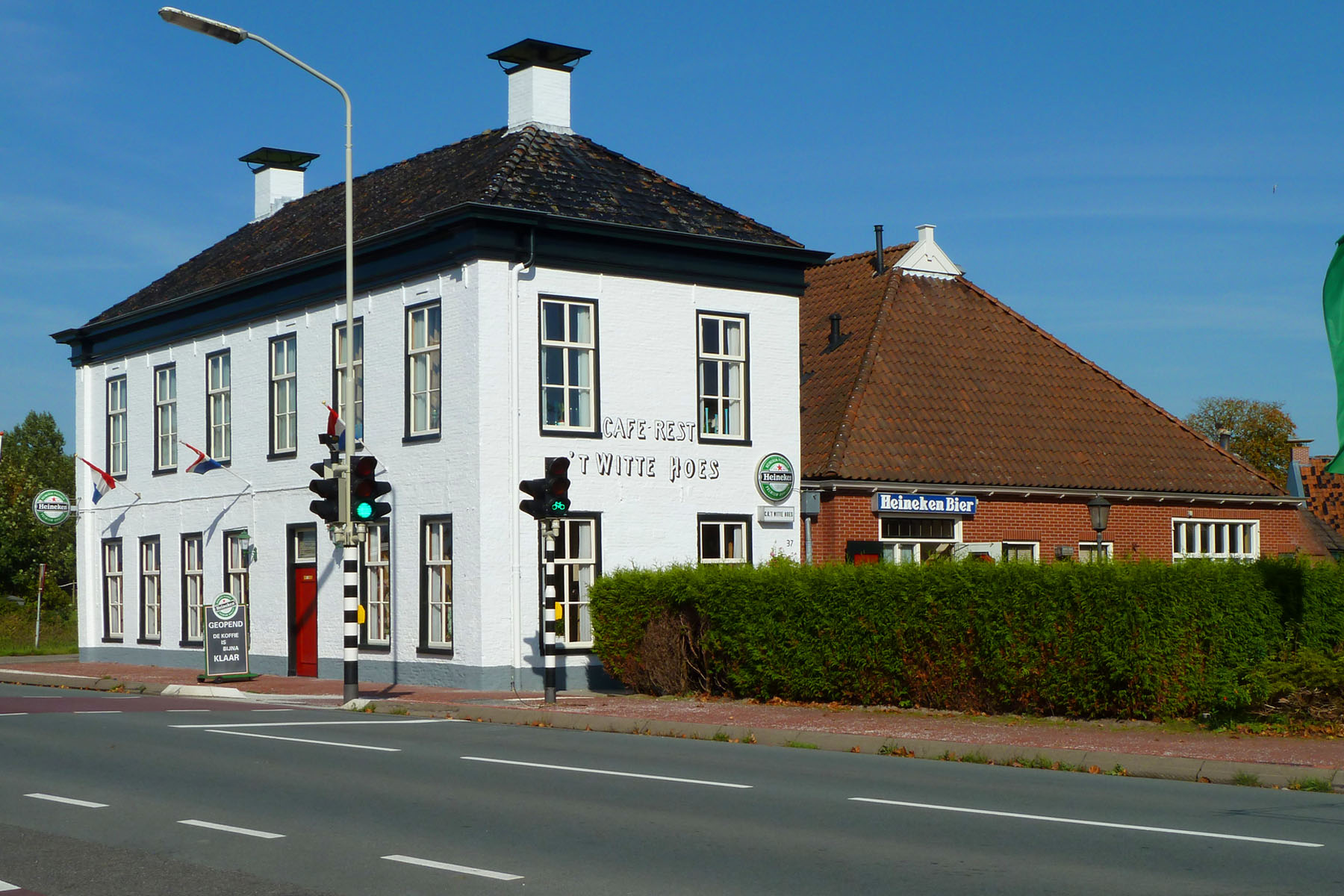
- Bar restaurant 't Witte Hoes

- Flag Seal

- Location of Adorp in the province of Groningen Adorp (Netherlands)
- Coordinates: 53°16′29″N 6°32′4″E
- Country: Netherlands
- Province: Groningen
- Municipality: Het Hogeland

Area
  - Total: 0.46 km^{2} (0.18 sq mi)
- Elevation: 1 m (3.3 ft)

Population (2021)
  - Total: 525
  - Density: 1,100/km^{2} (3,000/sq mi)
- Time zone: UTC+1 (CET)
  - Summer (DST): UTC+2 (CEST)
- Postal code: 9774
- Dialing code: 050
- Website: adorp.com

Adorp (Dutch: [ˈaːdɔr(ə)p]; Gronings: Oadörp [ˈʊːdœːp]) is a village in the municipality of Het Hogeland, Netherlands. It is located about 6 km north of Groningen. Until 1990, Adorp was a separate municipality, however the seat was in Sauwerd.

== History ==
Adorp started in the middle ages as a settlement in a bend in the River Hunze. Later, the river moved westwards. It was first mentioned as Artharpe in 1371. The origin of the name is unclear, it seems to read river (A) village (dorp), however the earliest names started with Ar. The church dates from 1667. In 1840, it was home to 1,030 people.

== Gallery ==
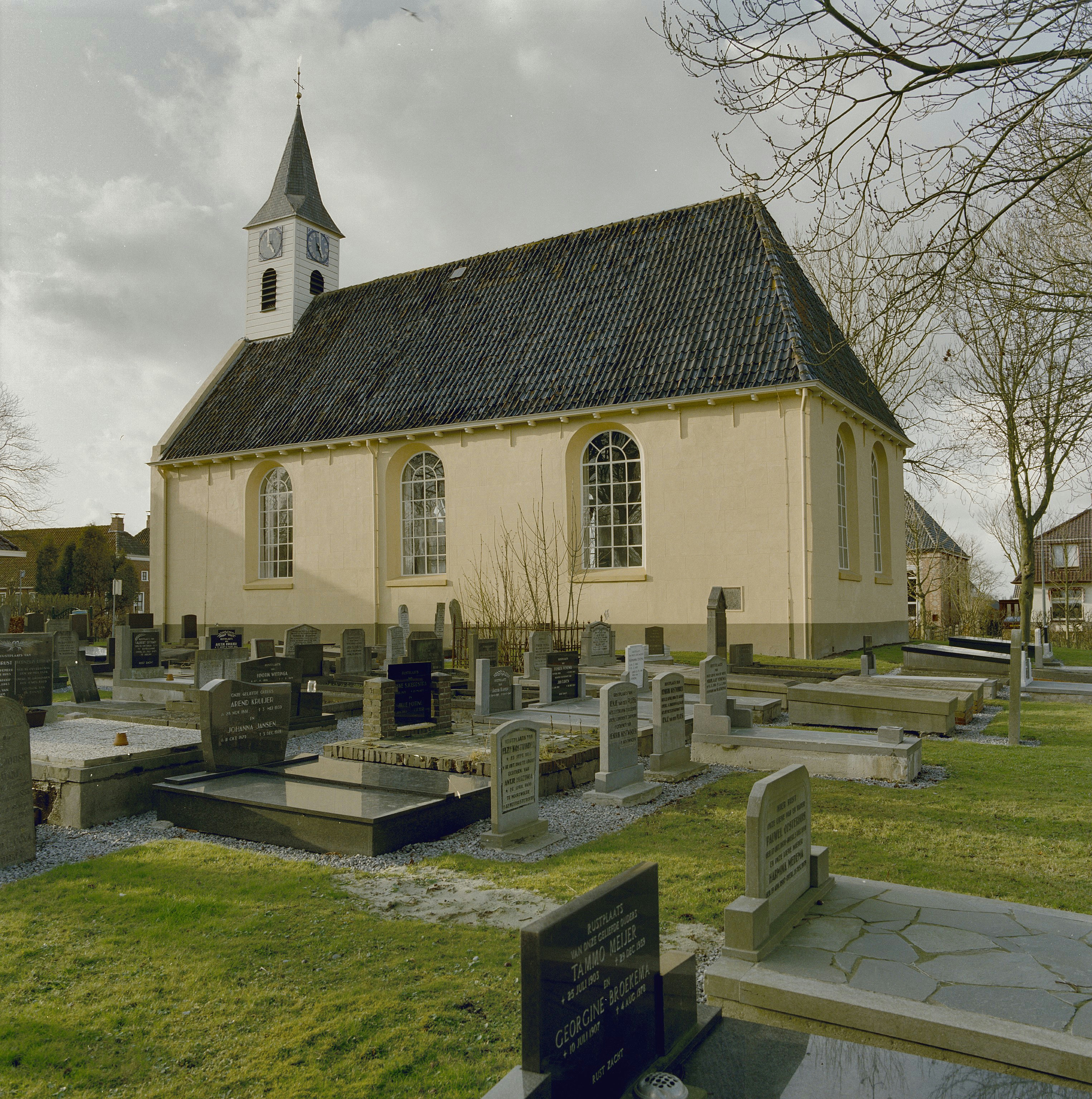
Protestant church

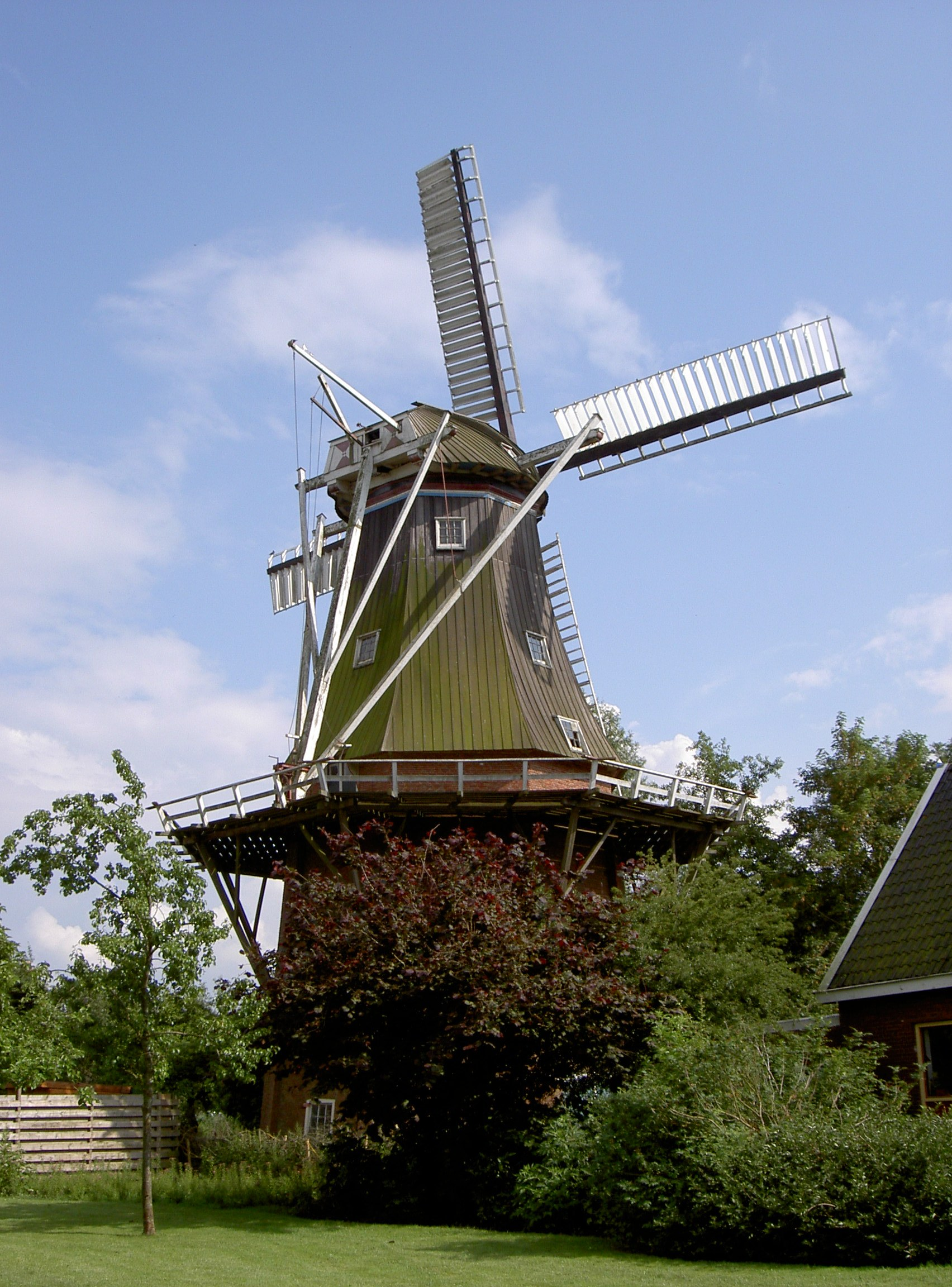
Windmill Aeolus

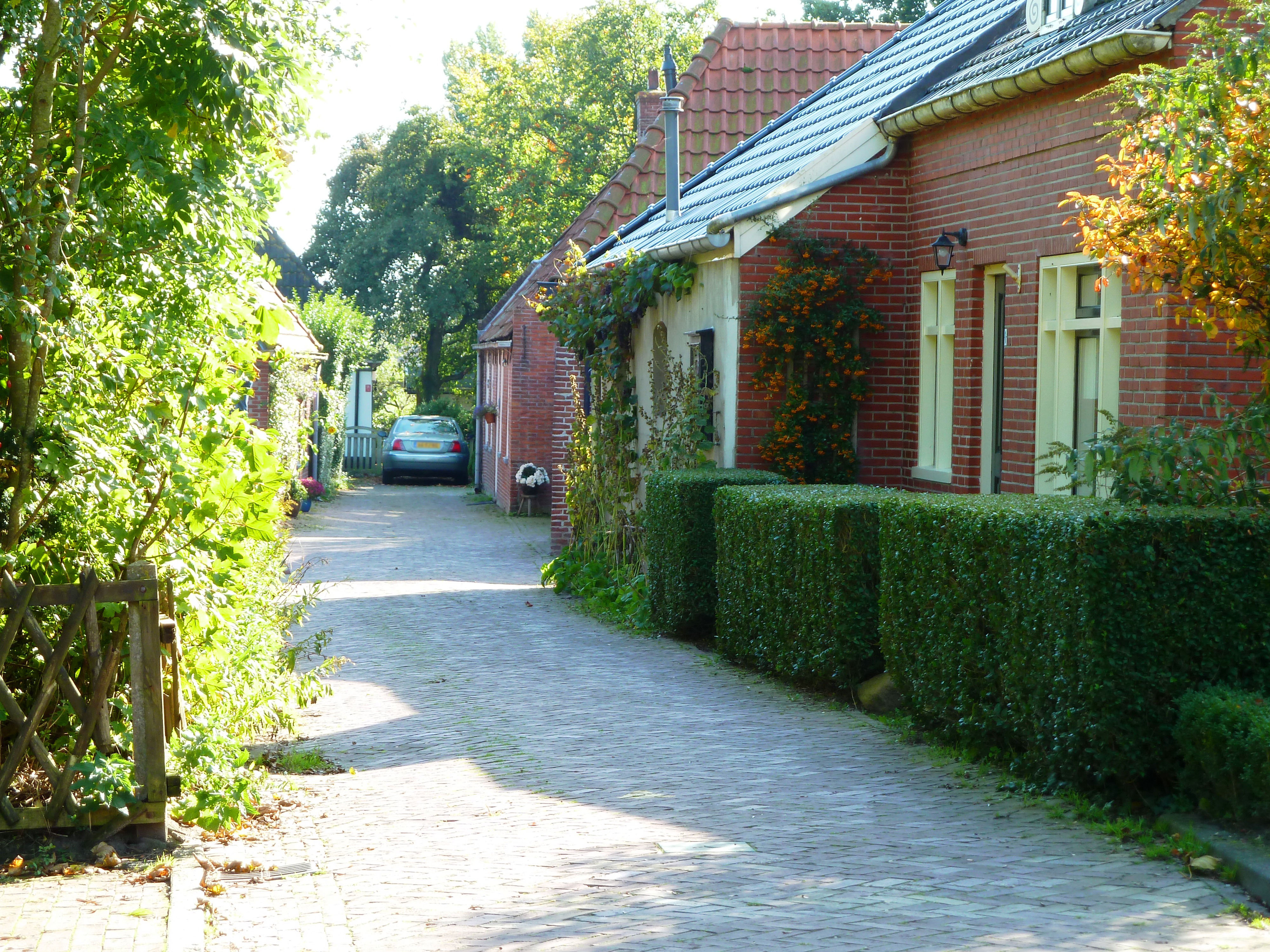
Little street in Adorp
