= List of megaliths =

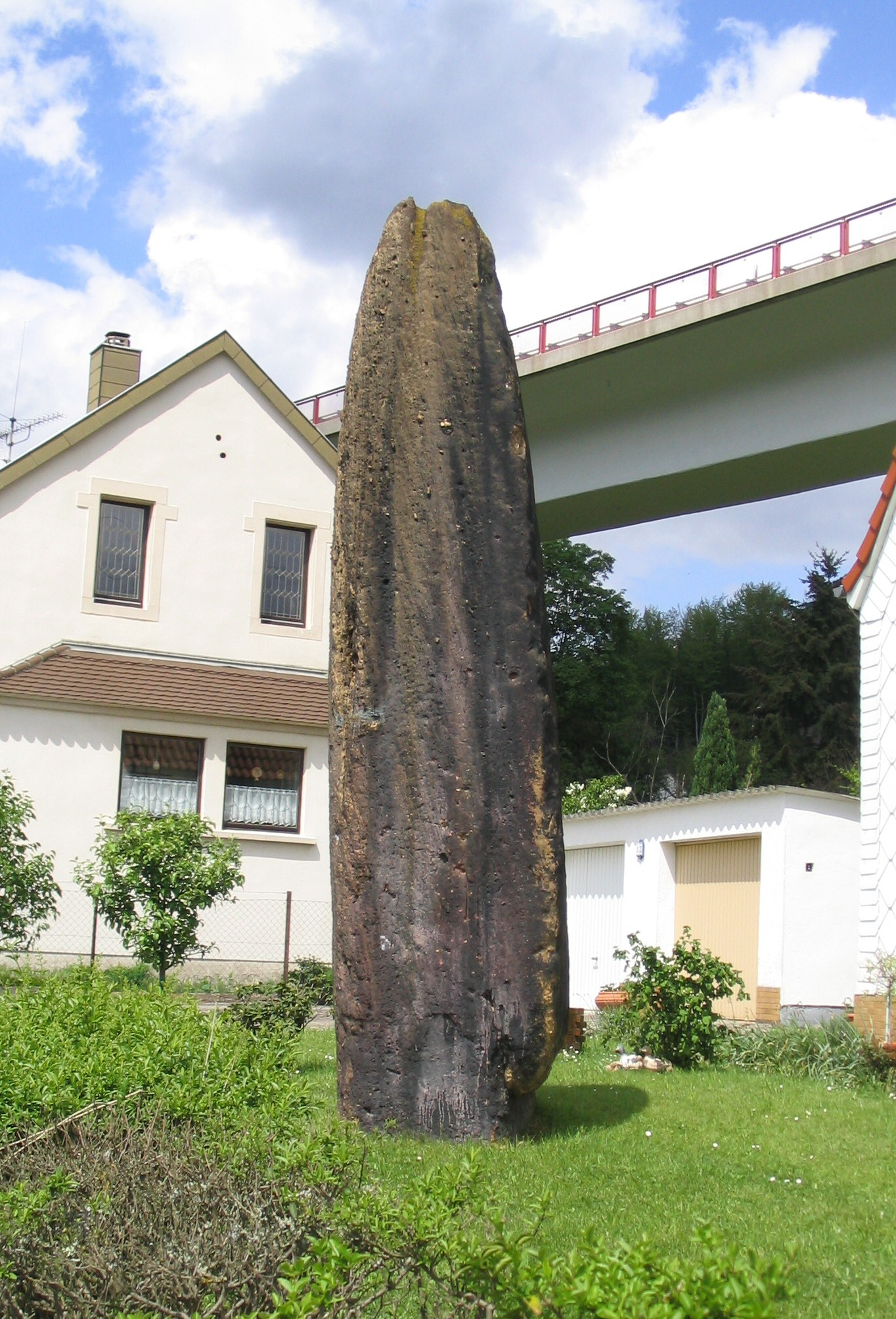
Spellenstein (St. Ingbert, Germany)

This is a list of megaliths.

== Armenia ==
- Zorats Karer, Syunik, Armenia

== Bulgaria ==
Related to quartz-bearing rocks (granite; gneiss): in the Sakar and Strandja Mountains; Sredna Gora Mountain (Buzovgrad).

- Ovcharovo, Haskovo Province in Sakar
- Pobit Kamak, Pazardzhik Province in the Rhodopes
- Belintash, Rhodopi Region, Plovdiv District
- Begliktash, Burgas District
- Garlo Nuraghe, Pernik District
- Tatul, Kardzhali District
- Ostrusha mound, Shipka (town), Stara Zagora Province

== Czech Republic ==
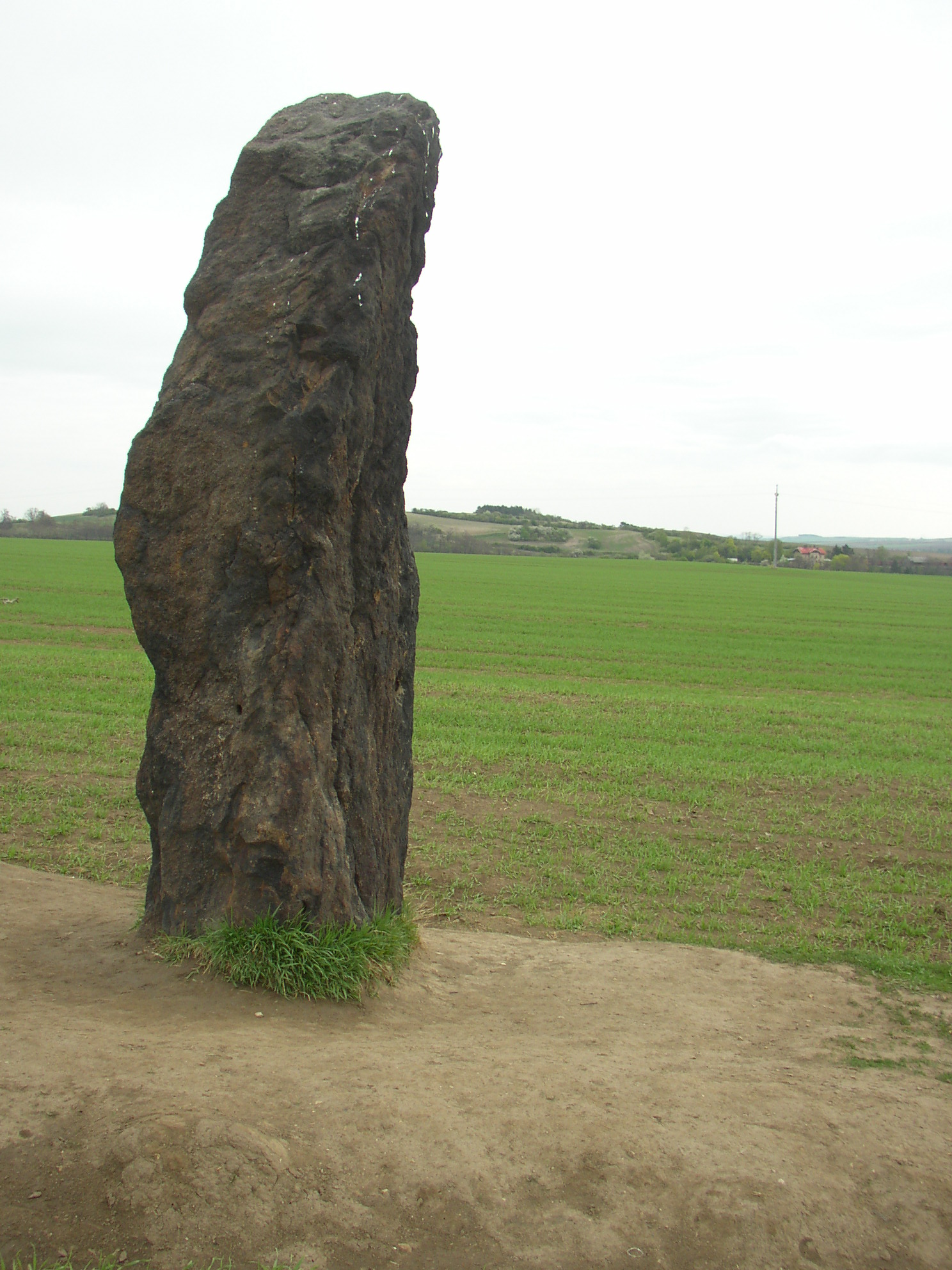
Kamenný pastýř in Klobuky, Czech Republic

Menhir in Dolni Chabry, Czech Republic

- Dolní Chabry
- Drahomyšl
- Družec
- Horoměřice
- Jemníky
- Kersko
- Klobuky, Central Bohemia, some 25 km NW of Prague - GPS: N50°18'4.49", E13°59'4.23". Known as Kamenný pastýř (Stone shepherd), it is the tallest of Czech menhirs, over 3 m (10 ft) tall.
- Klůček
- Ledce
- Louny (Selibice)
- Libenice
- Orasice
- Slaný
- Slavětín
- Tuchlovice
- Vinařice
- Žatec (Březno)

== France ==
The French ministry of culture lists the following numbers of megalithic monuments:

Menhirs: 1172

Dolmen: 1349

- Carnac stones, Brittany
- Mégalithes du causse de Blandas, over 80 megaliths exist on the Blandas plateau in the Massif Central ( Gard department) in southern France.
- La Noce de Pierres, Brittany
- Filitosa, Corsica
- Saint-Sulpice-de-Faleyrens, Gironde
- Cham des Bondons, Lozère
- Peyre Quillade stones, Ariège
- Megalithic sites of Charente

== Germany ==
- The Blinkerwall, below the waters of the Bay of Mecklenburg
- Gollenstein, Blieskastel (6.6 m high)
- Spellenstein, St. Ingbert (5 m high)
- Mittelbrunn, Rhineland-Palz

== Indonesia ==
- Cipari
- Gunung Padang
- Lebak Cibedug
- Pokekea
- Pugung Raharjo

== Ireland ==
- Ardgroom
- Beenalaght
- Bohonagh
- Drombeg
- Eightercua
- Glantane east
- Knocknakilla
- Reask

== Israel ==
- Atlit Yam drowned stone semicircle

== Italy ==
- Menhirs Valley - ozieri, Sardinia
- Goni, Sardinia
- Lugnacco North West Italy.

== Malta ==
- Kercem - Gozo Dawwara standing stone.
- Kirkop
- Qala - Gozo
- Wied Ghomar - Rabat
- Xemxija

== The Netherlands ==
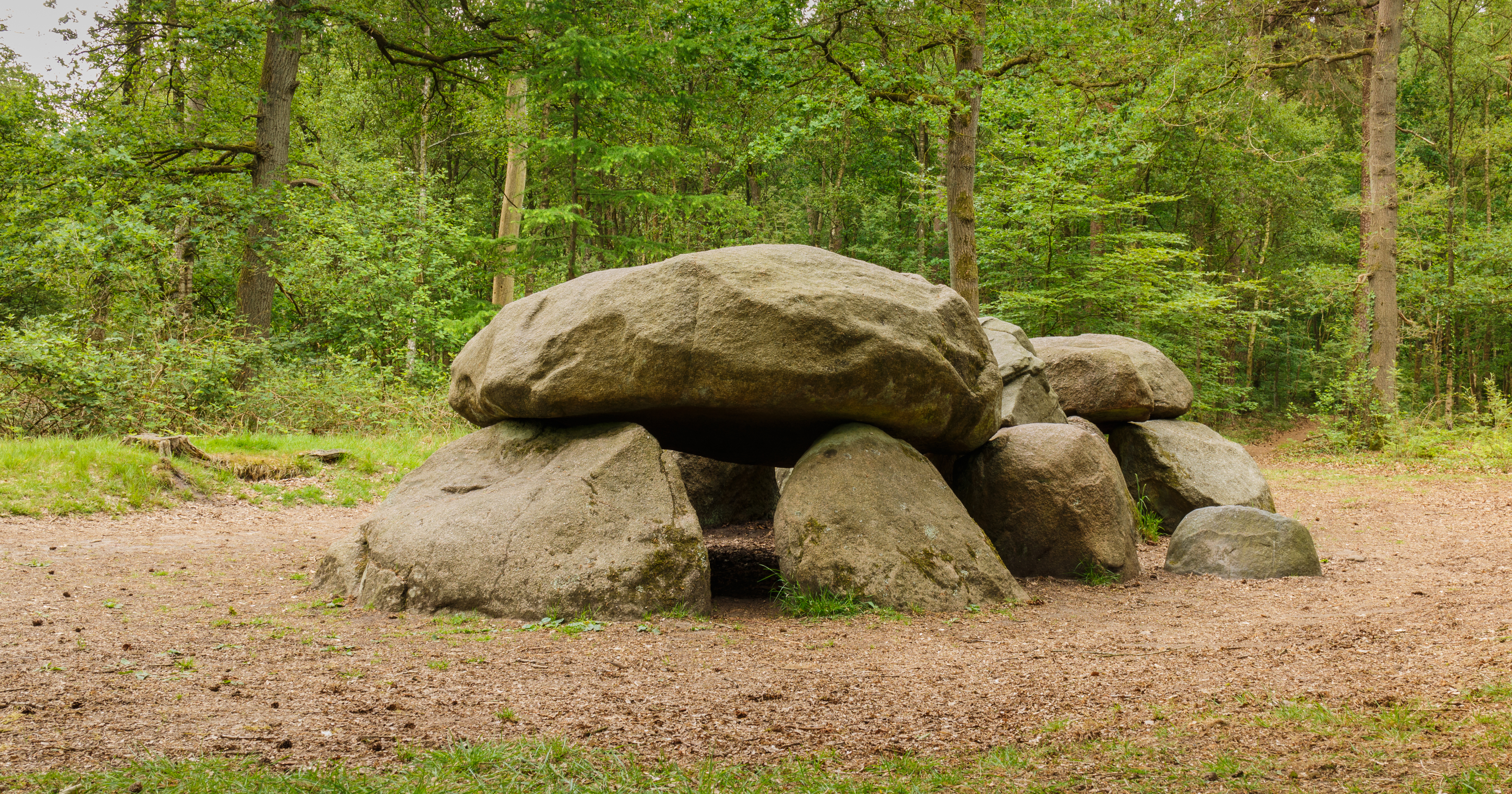
Dolmen or hunebed D8 in the forest of De Strubben-Kniphorstbos, Drenthe

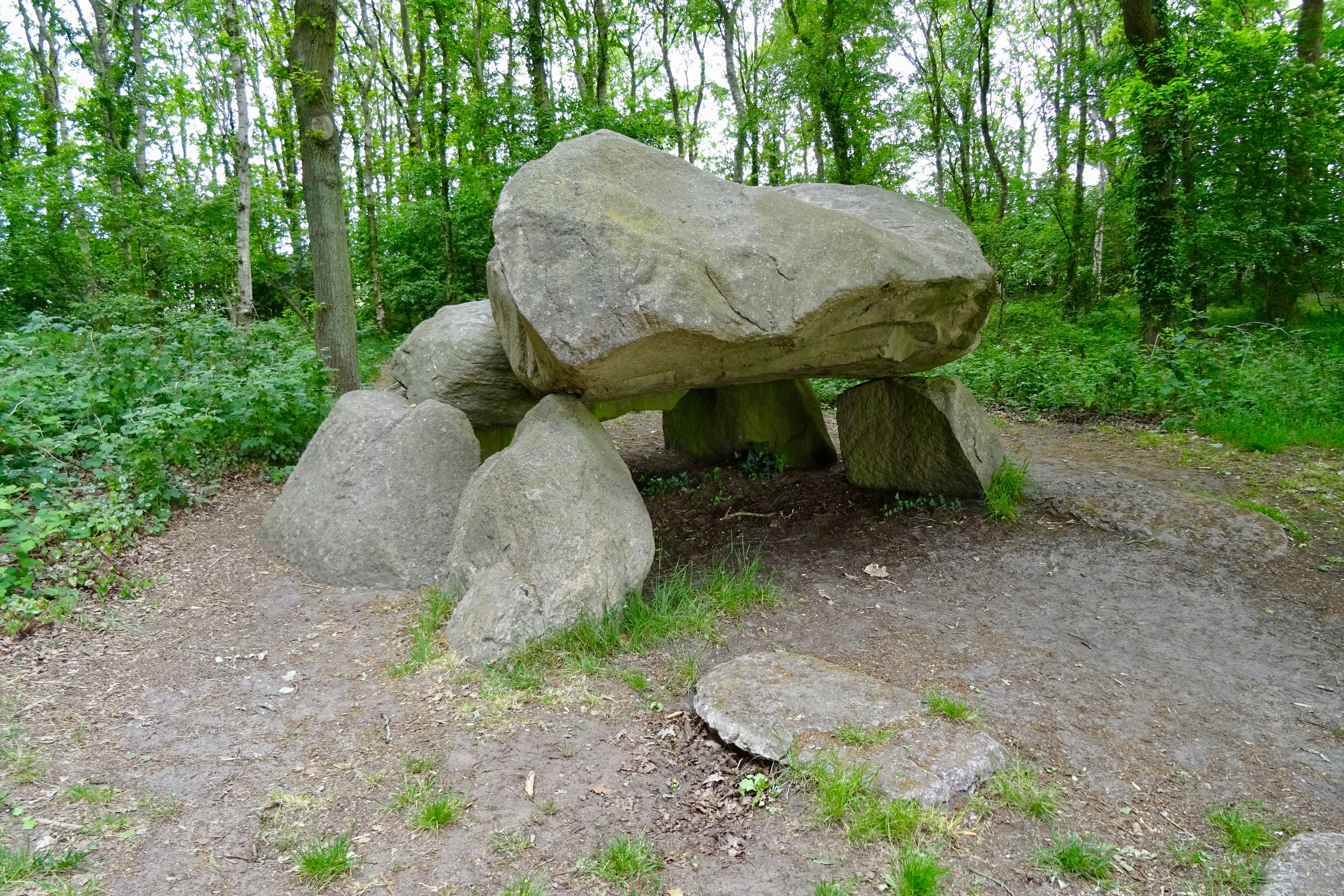
Dolmen G05, Noordlaren, Groningen

In the Netherlands megaliths were created with erratics from glaciers in the northeastern part of the country. These megaliths are locally known as hunebedden (hunebeds) and are usually dolmens. Parts of 53 of these hunebeds are known to exist on their original locations.

The different hunebeds are differentiated by province and number. "D" means Drenthe, "G" means Groningen, "O" means Overijssel and "F" means Friesland.

- D1 north of Steenbergen
- D2 in Westervelde
- D3 and D4 (aside of one another) in Midlaren
- D5 north of Zeijen
- D6 in Tynaarlo
- D7 southeast of Schipborg
- D8 north of Anloo
- D9 in Annen
- D10 north of Gasteren
- D11 south of Anloo
- D12 west of Eext
- D13 in the western quarter of Eext
- D14 south of Eext (Eexterhalte)
- D15 north of Loon
- D16 northwest of Balloo
- D17 and D18 (close to one another) in Rolde
- D19 and D20 (aside of one another) in Drouwen
- D21 and D22 (aside of one another) west of Bronneger (slightly west of D23, D24 and D25)
- D23 D24 and D25 (close to one another) west of Bronneger (slightly east of D21 and D22)
- D26 in between Drouwen and Borger (Drouwenerveld)
- D27 in Borger
- D28 and D29 (aside of one another) east of Borger
- D30 northwest of Exloo
- D31 south of Exloo
- D32 northwest of Odoorn
- D34 west of Valthe
- D35 southwest of Valthe
- D36 and D37 (aside of one another) south of Valthe
- D38, D39 and D40 (aside of one another) north of Emmen (Emmerveld)
- D41 in northern Emmen
- D42 north of Westenesch and west of Emmen
- D43 west of Emmen (Schimmeres)
- D44 in Westenesch west of Emmen
- D45 in the forest of Emmerdennen in Emmen
- D46 and D47 (close to one another) in Angelslo within Emmen
- D49 southeast of Schoonoord, Coevorden: known as Papeloze Kerk (Popeless Church, with "Pope" referring to a local cleric/priest)
- D50 and D51 northeast of Noord-Sleen
- D52 northeast of Diever
- D53 and D54 (close to one another) northwest of Havelte
- G1 southwest of Noordlaren

There are also many known hunebeds which disappeared due to different types of activities. They are usually referred to with the number of a nearby existing hunebed and differentiated by lower case letters.

- D6a in Tynaarlo
- D8a north of Anloo
- D8b north of Anloo
- D13a west of Eext: removed and dug away by the owner of the land in 1923 (being enthusiastic about the finds)
- D13b west of Eext
- D13c west of Eext
- D31a south of Exloo (Zuiderveld): boulders removed in between 1855 and 1875
- D32a northwest of Odoorn: last visible remains removed/destroyed in the 19th century
- D32c northwest of Odoorn: last visible remains removed/destroyed in the 19th century
- D32d northwest of Odoorn: possibly destroyed in the early 19th century
- D33 west of Valthe (north of D34): already badly preserved, its last boulders were removed during archaeological research of the 1950s
- D35a southwest of Valthe: on the basis of personal accounts destroyed in the 1870s
- D37a west of Weerdinge and north of Emmen (Valtherbos): excavated in 1837 and destroyed in the period thereafter
- D39a north of Emmen
- D43a west of Emmen: presumably destroyed in the 1860s or 1870s
- D44a in Emmen: destroyed due to the expansion of the city of Emmen
- D52a north of Diever and Wapse (Berkenheuvel)
- D54a southeast of Spier
- D54b east of Hooghalen (Boswachterij Hooghalen)
- D54c east of Hooghalen (Boswachterij Hooghalen)
- F1 south of Rijs (Rijsterbos): destroyed in 1849 during the construction of ditches
- G2 in/around Glimmen: destroyed in the 10th/11th century (on the basis of archaeological research)
- G3 in/around Glimmen: destroyed in the 10th/11th century (on the basis of archaeological research)
- G4 in/around Onnen
- G5 in Heveskesklooster of the former village of Heveskes in the municipality of Eemsdelta: partially destroyed due to natural causes, the other remains were moved to museum Muzeeaquarium in Delfzijl in 1987
- G6 in Heveskesklooster of the former village of Heveskes in the municipality of Eemsdelta: partially destroyed due to natural causes, the other remains were moved to museum Hunebedcentrum in Borger in 1987
- O1 northeast of Steenwijkerwold: boulders thought to be removed in the 19th century
- O2 northeast of Mander, Overijssel

== Poland ==
- Węsiory

== Portugal ==
Menires e cromeleques de Portugal

- Menir de Aspradantes
- Menir de Mac Abraão
- Menir de São Paio de Antas
- Menir dos Almendres
- Menires de Lavajo

== Romania ==
- Histria Neolithic 2.5 m high

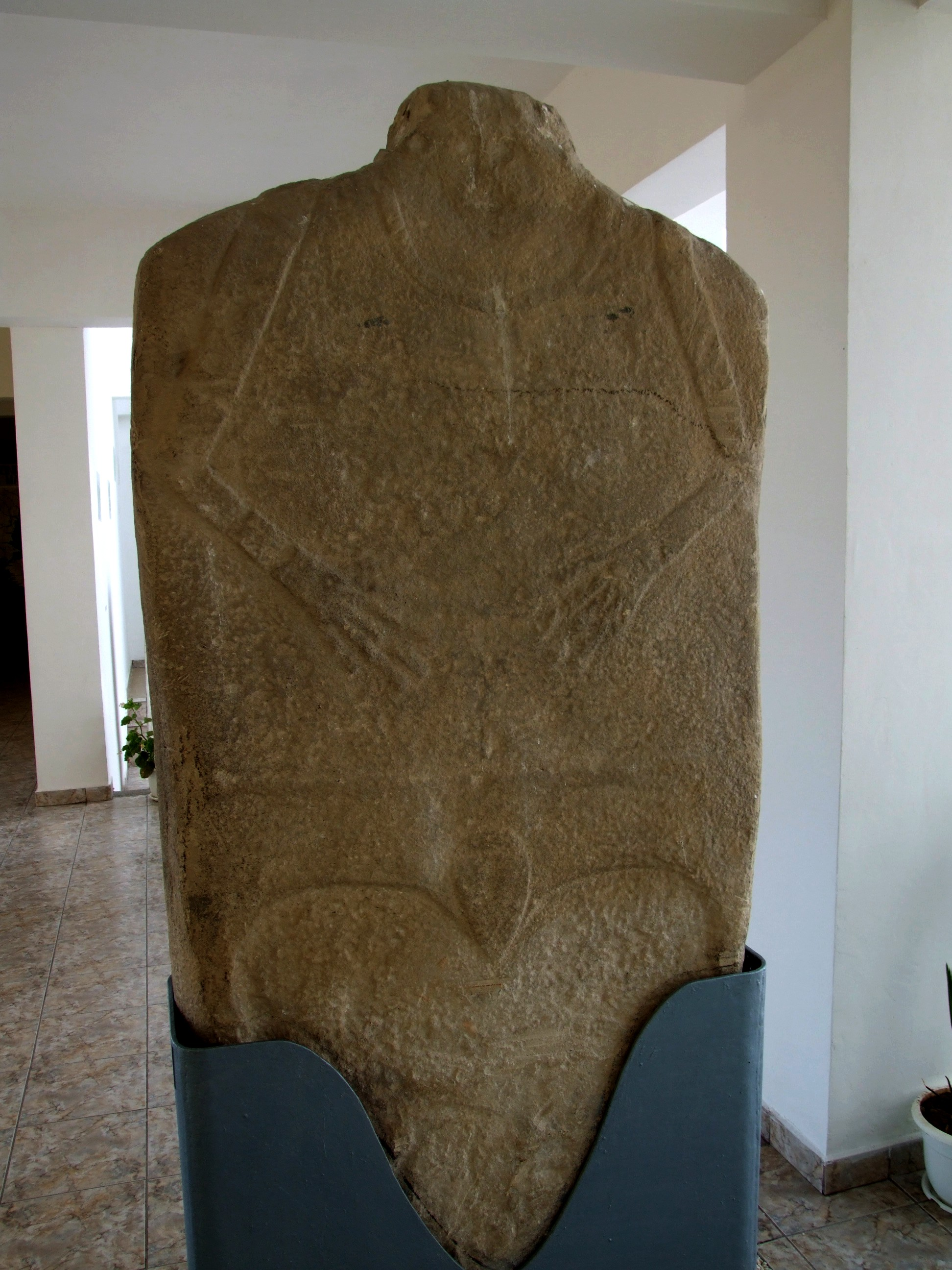
Histria Museum

== Serbia ==
The graves of the "Latins" and the "Jidovs" near the village Balwan (Bovan), north of Aleksinac in Serbia.

== Spain ==
- Cova d'en Daina
- Cueva de Menga
- Naveta d'Es Tudons
- The Taula of Menorca

== Sweden ==
- Björketorp Runestone, a menhir inscribed with runes
- Gettlinge, Öland
- Hulterstad, Öland, south of the village of Alby

== Denmark ==
- Jelling

== Switzerland ==
- Menhirs in Grandson, Yverdon and Concise

== Turkey ==
- Göbekli Tepe
- Gürcütepe
- Mount Nemrut
- Nevalı Çori
- Obelisk of Theodosius

== United Kingdom ==
=== England ===
- Rudston Monolith, Rudston, Yorkshire
- The Devil's Arrows, Boroughbridge, Yorkshire
- Drizzlecombe, Dartmoor
- Beardown Man, Dartmoor
- Laughter Tor, near Two Bridges, Dartmoor
- Goonhilly Downs, Cornwall
- Five Kings, Upper Coquerdale, Northumberland
- The Rollright Stones King Stone, Long Compton, Oxfordshire/Warwickshire border

=== Scotland ===
- Callanish, Isle of Lewis
- Clach an Trushal, Ballantrushal, Lewis.
- Cuff Hill, near Beith, North Ayrshire.
- Draffen, Stewarton, East Ayrshire.
- Drybridge, North Ayrshire.
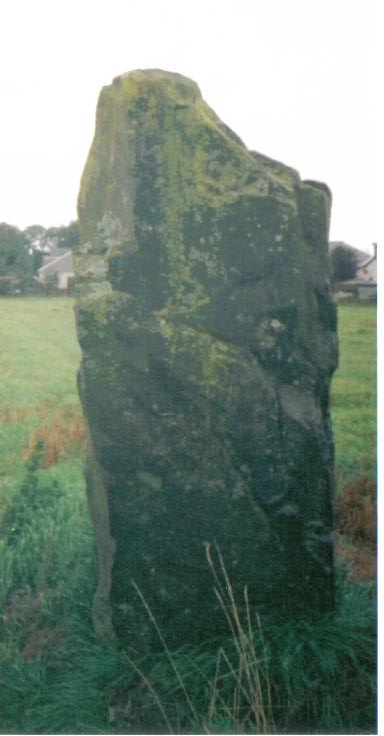
  The menhir at Drybridge.
- Gigha, Argyll and Bute.
- Granny Kempock Stone, Gourock, Inverclyde
- Lochmaben Stone, Dumfries.
- Machrie Moor Stone Circles, Isle of Arran.
- Millport on Cumbrae, Firth of Clyde.

=== Wales ===
- Bryn Dyfrydog Stone, Anglesey
- Clorach Stone, Anglesey
- Cremlyn Stones, Anglesey
- Harold's Stones, Trelleck, Monmouthshire
- Hirdre-Faig, Anglesey
- Llanddona, Anglesey
- Llandegfan, Anglesey
- Llandonna Stone, Anglesey
- Lledwigan Stone, Anglesey
- Maen Chwyf, Rhosybol, Anglesey
- Maen Llech Gwern Farwydd, Anglesey
- Maenaddwyn Stone, Anglesey
- Ynys Fawr Stone, Anglesey

== See also ==
- Menhir

=== Other lists ===
- List of megalithic sites
- List of tallest statues
- List of statues
- List of colossal sculpture in situ
- List of archaeoastronomical sites sorted by country
- List of Egyptian pyramids
- List of Mesoamerican pyramids
