= Steenbergen (disambiguation) =

Steenbergen is a town and municipality in North Brabant, the Netherlands.

Steenbergen may also refer to:

- Battle of Steenbergen (1583)
- Steenbergen, Noordenveld, a hamlet in the north of Drenthe, the Netherlands
- Steenbergen (surname)
