= Crymlyn =

Crymlyn may refer to:

- Crymlyn Bog, a nature reserve near Swansea, Wales, U.K.
- Crymlyn Burrows, an area of land in Wales, UK

== See also ==
- Cremlyn, Beaumaris, Anglesey, Wales, U.K.
- Crumlin, Caerphilly, Caerphilly county borough, South Wales, U.K.
