= Odoorn =

- Village
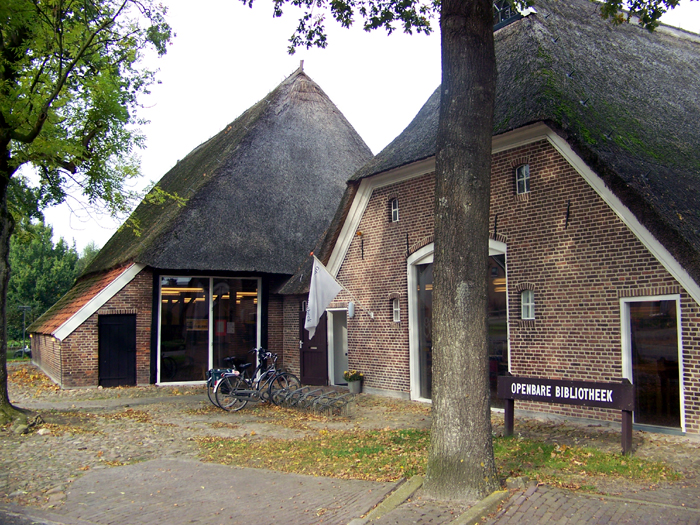
- The library in 2007

- Location in the province of Drenthe in the Netherlands Odoorn (Netherlands)
- Coordinates: 52°51′N 6°51′E
- Country: Netherlands
- Province: Drenthe
- Municipality: Borger-Odoorn

Area
  - Total: 13.81 km^{2} (5.33 sq mi)
- Elevation: 24 m (79 ft)

Population (2021)
  - Total: 1,890
  - Density: 137/km^{2} (354/sq mi)
- Time zone: UTC+1 (CET)
  - Summer (DST): UTC+2 (CEST)
- Postal code: 7873
- Dialing code: 0591

Odoorn (Dutch pronunciation: [ˈoːdoːr(ə)n]) is a village in the Dutch province of Drenthe. It is a part of the municipality of Borger-Odoorn, and lies about nine km north of Emmen.

== History ==
The village was first mentioned in 1327 as "Remboldus in Oderen". It is assumed it means "settlement of the people of Odheri (person)", because older forms often used the suffix -ing.

Odoorn is an esdorp which developed in the Early Middle Ages on the Hondsrug along the road from Groningen to Coevorden. In the 13th century, a daughter church of Anloo was established in the village, and it developed into the central settlement for the satellites Valthe and Exloo.

The Dutch Reformed church was built around 1200 and is built using many large stones. Some of the stones have probably been taken from nearby hunebedden (dolmen). The church suffered a collapse in 1634. It was extensively modified between 1856 and 1857. In 1897, it was restored after a fire.

The hunebed (dolmen) D32 is located near Odoorn. It is still half buried in the ground. It used to have five capstones, however one has gone missing.

Odoorn was home to 348 people in 1840. On 22 July 1945, three children were playing with left-over German ammunition, and they were killed when the ammunition exploded. In 1997, a memorial was placed at the site. Odoorn was a separate municipality until 1998, when it merged with Borger.

== Festivals ==
Odoorn hosts the multi-culture festival SIVO International Folkloristic Dans festival.

== Gallery ==
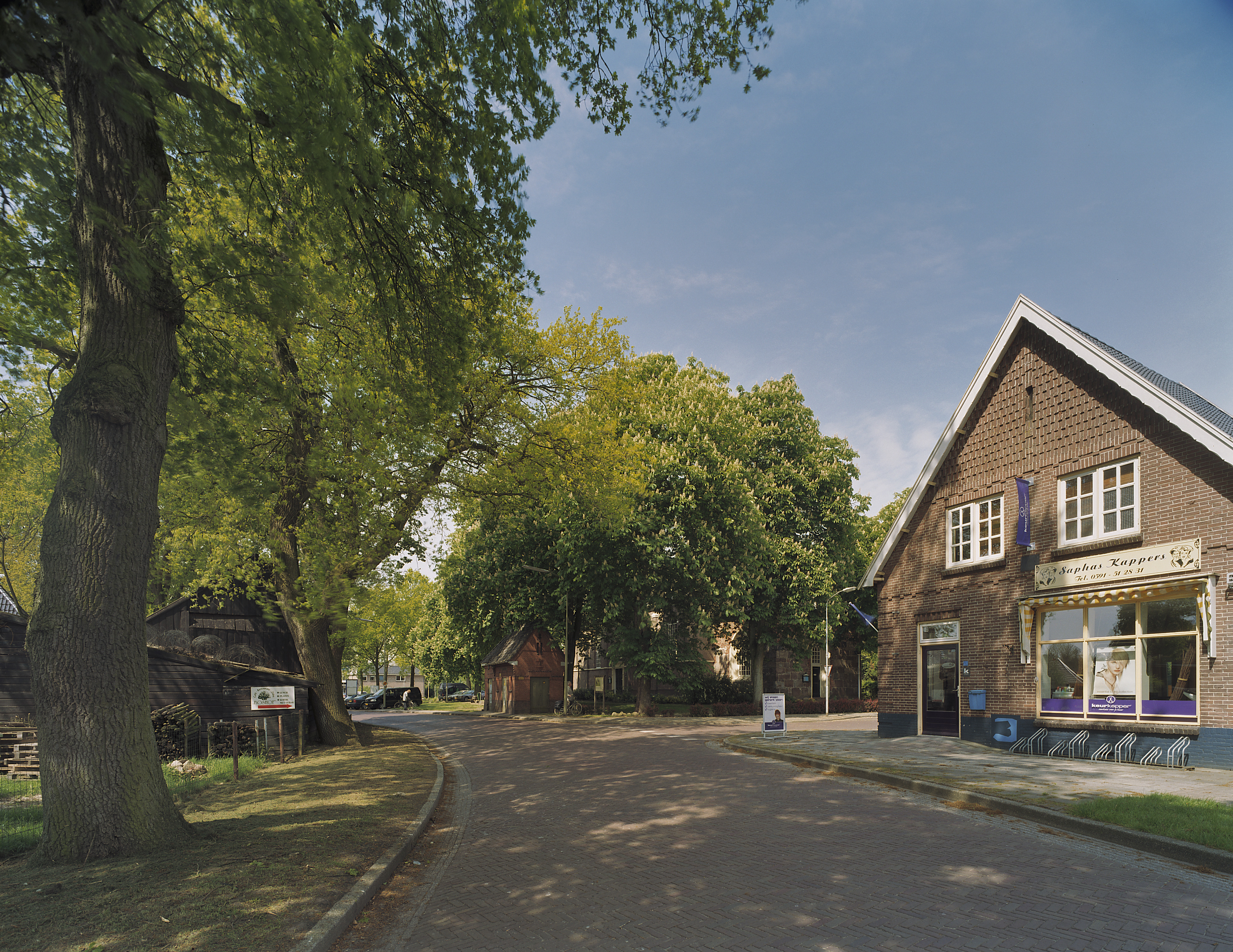
Street view

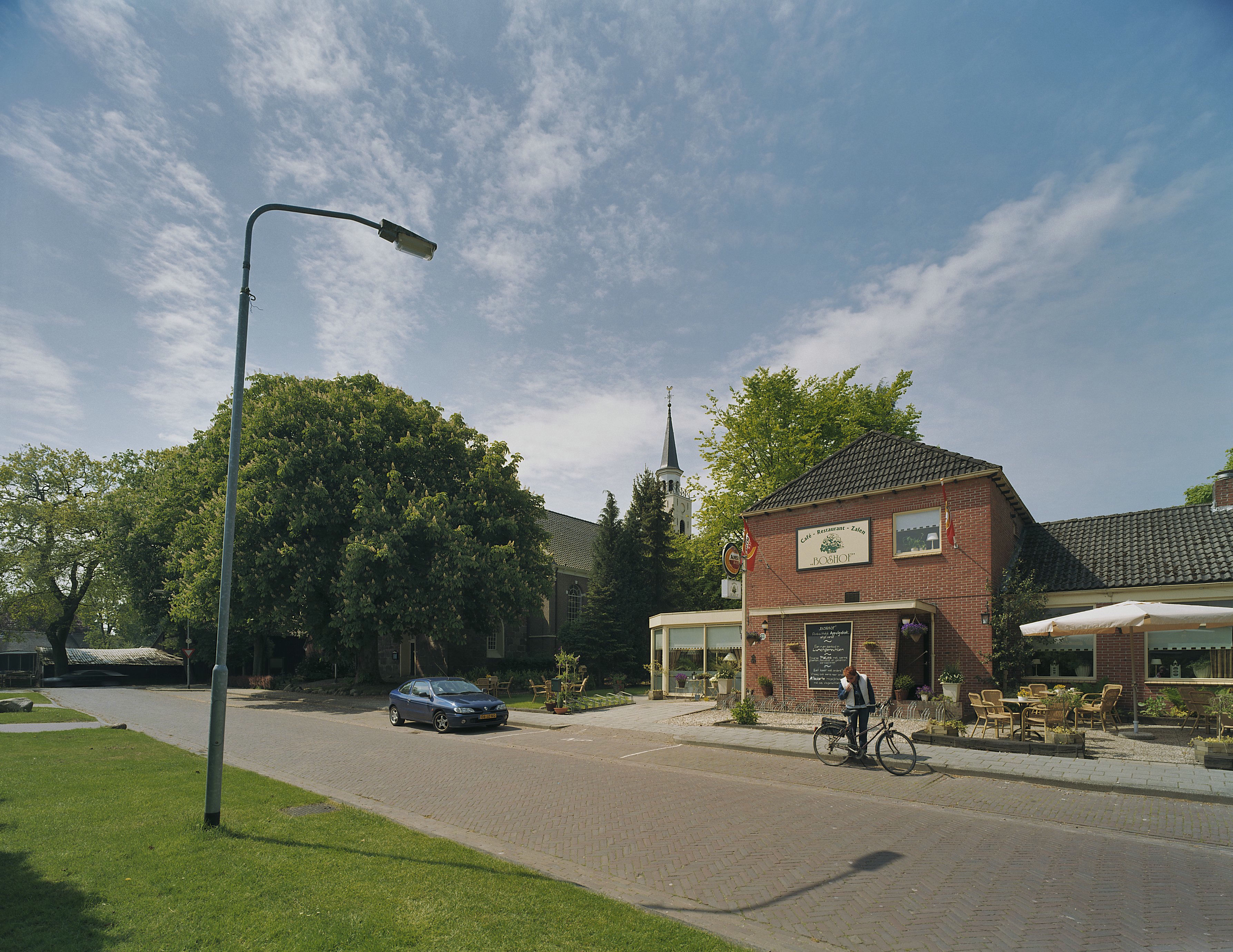
Village pub

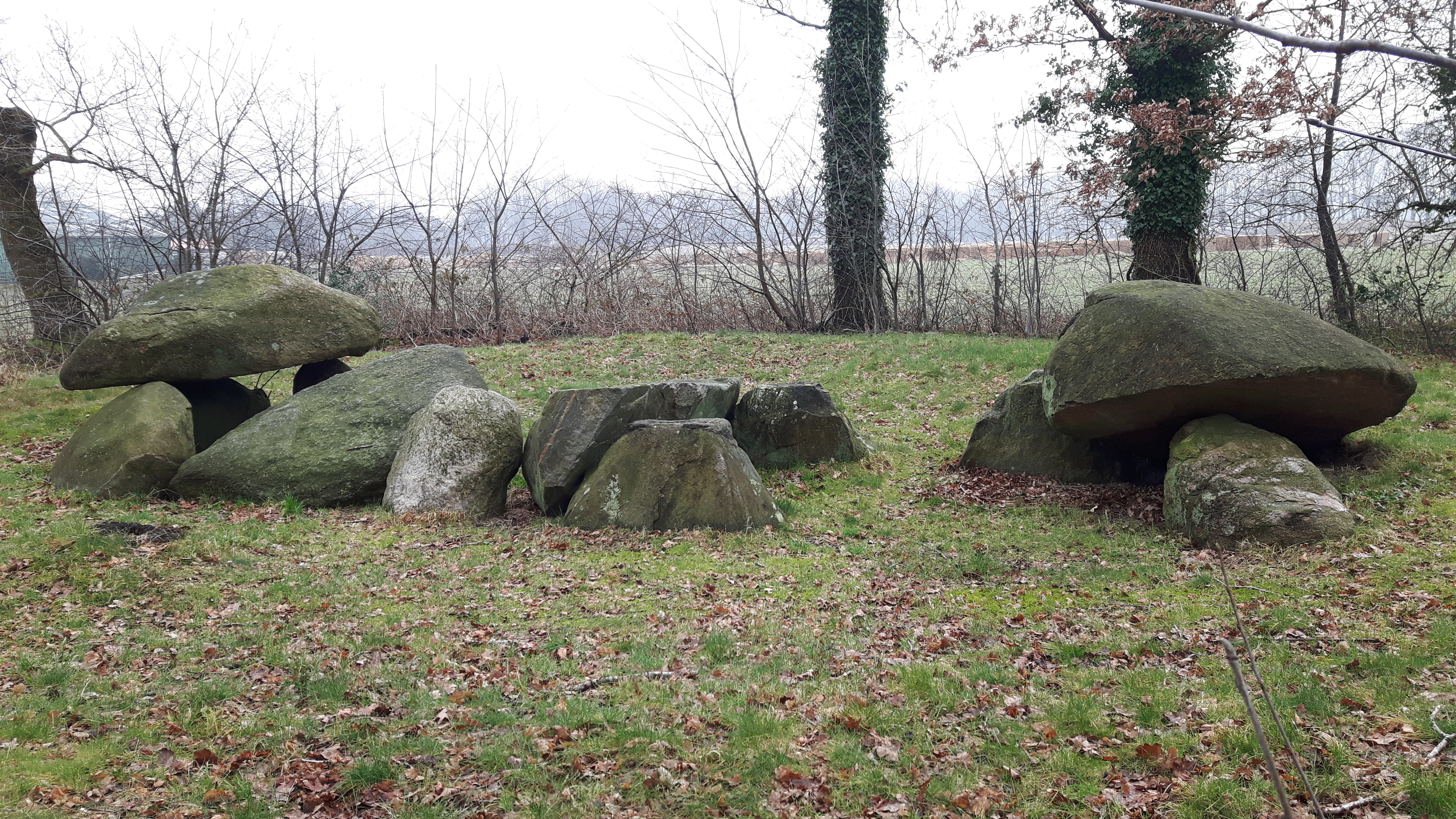
Hunebed (dolmen) D32

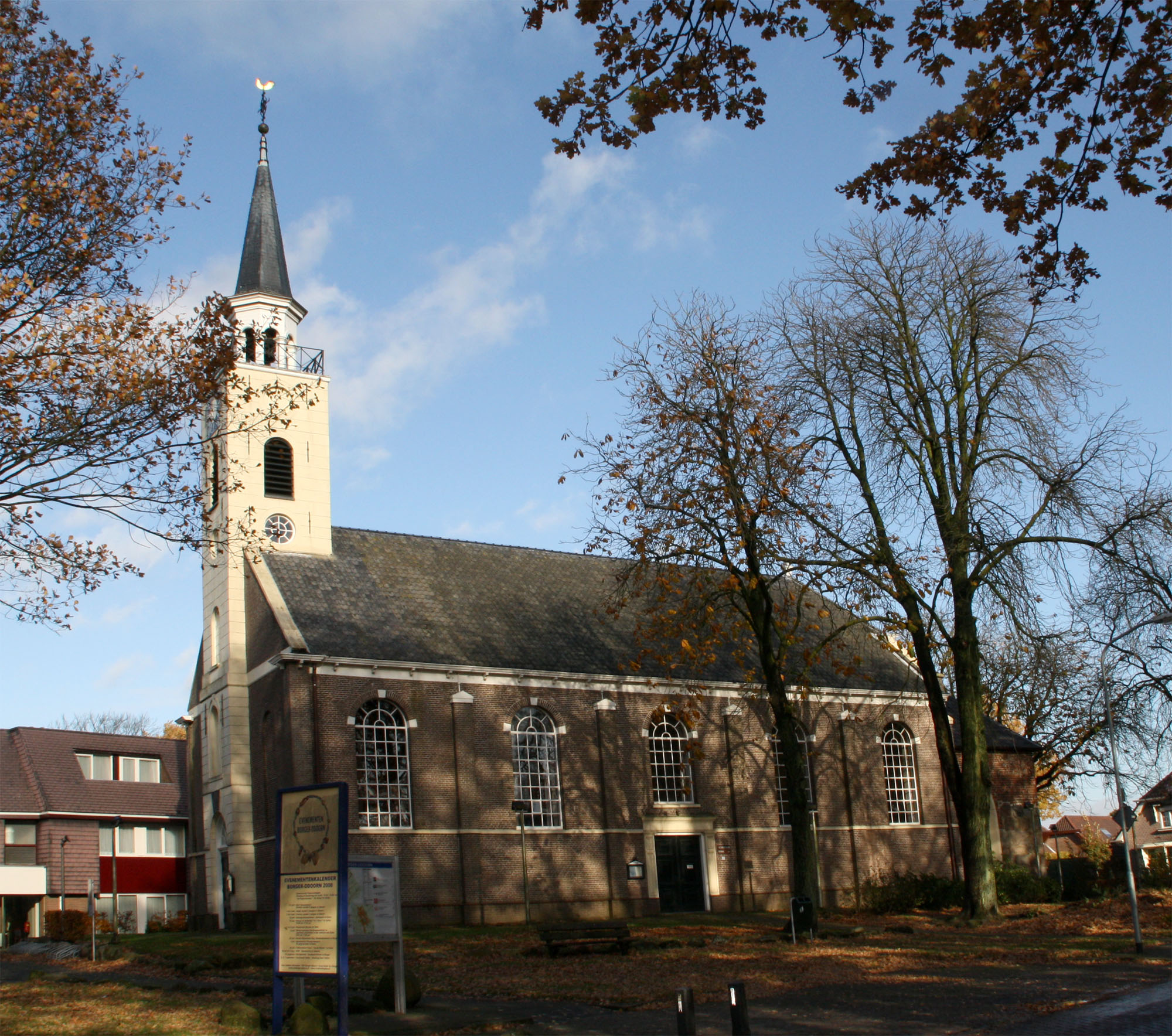
Dutch Reformed church
