= Steenberg (surname) =

Steenberg is the surname of the following people

- Erland Steenberg (1919–2009), Norwegian politician
- Per Steenberg (1870–1947), Norwegian organist and composer
- Schack August Steenberg Krogh (1874–1949), Danish physiologists

== See also ==
- Steenberghe
- Steenbergen (surname)
