= Steenberghe =

Steenberghe is a Dutch and Belgian surname. Notable people with the surname include:

- Florentine Steenberghe (born 1967), Dutch field hockey midfielder
- Jan Van Steenberghe (born 1972), Belgian football goalkeeper
- Johan Van Steenberghe (born 1956), Belgian Olympic swimmer
- Max Steenberghe (1899–1972), Dutch politician

== See also ==
- Steenberg (surname)
- Steenbergen (surname)
