= Steenbergen (surname) =

Steenbergen or Van Steenbergen is a Dutch and Belgian toponymic surname, indicating an origin in any number of places called "stone hills", like the city of Steenbergen, North Brabant or the village Steenbergen in Drenthe. People with the surname include:

- Dylan Steenbergen (born 1987), Canadian football offensive lineman
- Jan van Steenbergen (born 1970), Dutch linguist, journalist, translator and interpreter
- Kathleen Ann Steenberge (born 1957), American Democratic politician from Pennsylvania
- Marrit Steenbergen (born 2000), Dutch swimmer
- Niel Steenbergen (1911–1997), Dutch sculptor, painter and medalist
- Piet Steenbergen (1928–2010), Dutch football midfielder
- Quinta Steenbergen (born 1985), Dutch volleyball player
- Rik Van Steenbergen (1924–2003), Belgian cyclist
  - Memorial Rik Van Steenbergen, a single-day road bicycle race

== See also ==
- Steenberg (surname)
- Steenberghe
- Mary Steenburgen (born 1953), American actress
