= Hirdre-Faig =

Coordinates: 53.247896°N 4.278557°W

- Location within Anglesey
- OS grid reference: SH 4807 7474
  - Cardiff: 130.7 mi (210.3 km)
  - London: 212.3 mi (341.7 km)
- Community: Llanddyfnan
- Principal area: Anglesey
- Country: Wales
- Sovereign state: United Kingdom
- Post town: Llangefni
- Police: North Wales
- Fire: North Wales
- Ambulance: Welsh
- UK Parliament: Ynys Môn
- Senedd Cymru – Welsh Parliament: Ynys Môn

Hirdre-Faig or Hirdrefaig is an area in the community of Llanddyfnan, Anglesey, Wales, which is 130.7 miles (210.3 km) from Cardiff and 212.3 miles (341.7 km) from London.

According to the antiquary Thomas Nicholas in his 1872 book, the Hirdre-Faig estate was owned by a family that could trace its ancestry to Bleddyn ap Cynfyn. Their house is known to have been built in three phases, the latest of which has been dated to about 1710.

The other point of historic interest is a standing stone, which was designated an ancient monument in 2006.

== See also ==
- List of localities in Wales by population
