= Valthe =

- Village
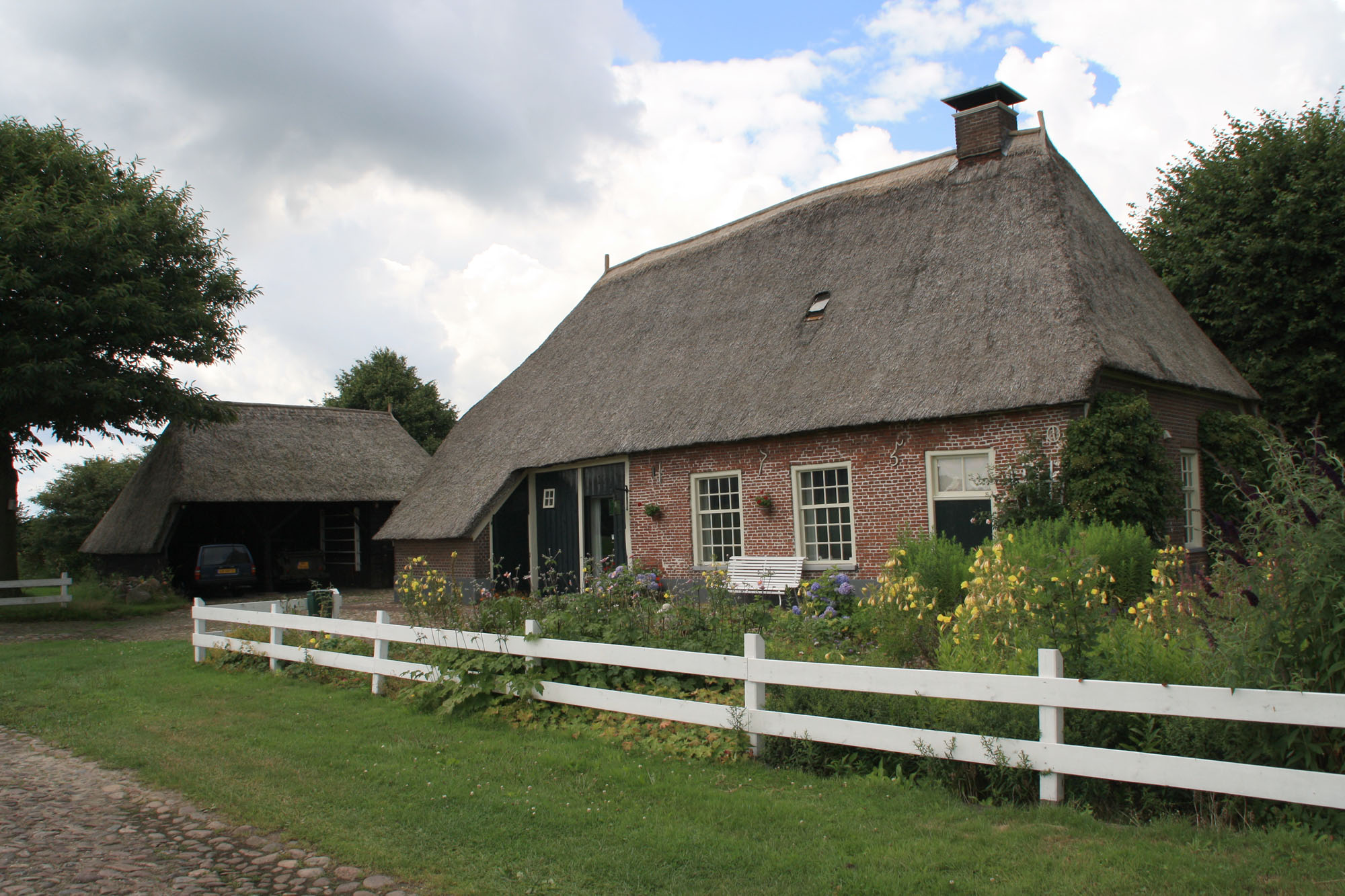
- Valthe farmhouse (1750)

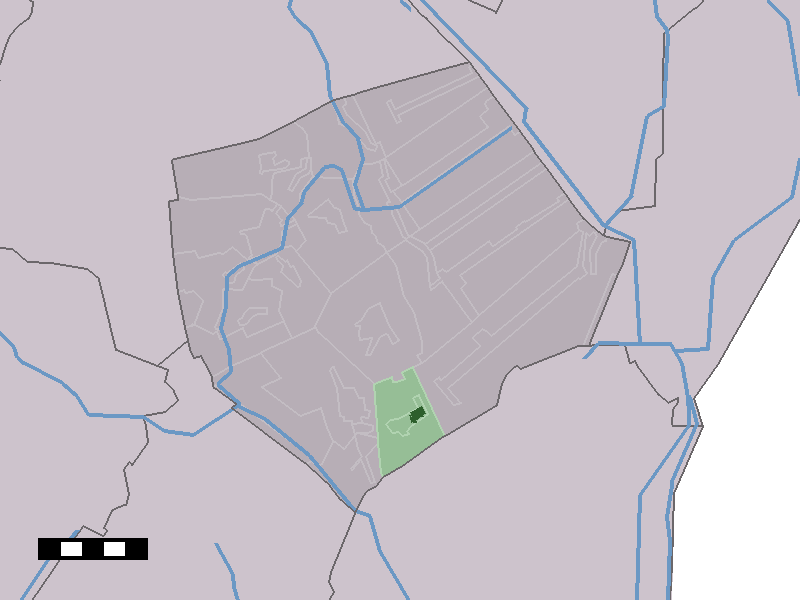
- The village centre (dark green) and the statistical district (light green) of Valthe in the municipality of Borger-Odoorn.

- Location of the village in the province of Drenthe Valthe (Netherlands)
- Coordinates: 52°51′N 6°54′E
- Country: Netherlands
- Province: Drenthe
- Municipality: Borger-Odoorn

Area
  - Total: 10.82 km^{2} (4.18 sq mi)
- Elevation: 22 m (72 ft)

Population (2021)
  - Total: 1,220
  - Density: 113/km^{2} (292/sq mi)
- Time zone: UTC+1 (CET)
  - Summer (DST): UTC+2 (CEST)
- Postal code: 7872
- Dialing code: 0591

Valthe is a village in the Dutch province of Drenthe. It is a part of the municipality of Borger-Odoorn, and lies about 8 km north of Emmen.

== History ==
The village was first mentioned in 1217 as "in Valten", and probably means "cow shed". Valthe is an esdorp which developed in the Middle Ages. It is possibly daughter settlement of Odoorn. The village centre is called Oud-Valthe and did not have a church, but was encircled by five essen (communal pastures).

In 1621, the Valtherschans was constructed. It was sconce to defend Drenthe against invasion. In 1665, Christoph Bernhard von Galen, the Prince-Bishop of Münster, tried to take the sconce but failed. The sconce was later neglected and disappeared from the landscape.

Valthe was home to 226 people in 1840.

In 1930, the small Bethel church was built in expressionist style. From 1942 until liberation in April 1945, there were 16 Jewish onderduikers (people in hiding) in an underground building in the forests near Valthe. They were never discovered. Between 2003 and 2004, the hut was restored and is open for public.

There were five hunebedden (dolmen) near Exloo: D33 to D37. D33 was totally destroyed and removed in 1955 for the construction of De Paploze Kerk in 1958. D36 and D37 are twins which are located on the south side of the village. They are in a neglected state and the capstones of D36 have fallen off.

== Gallery ==
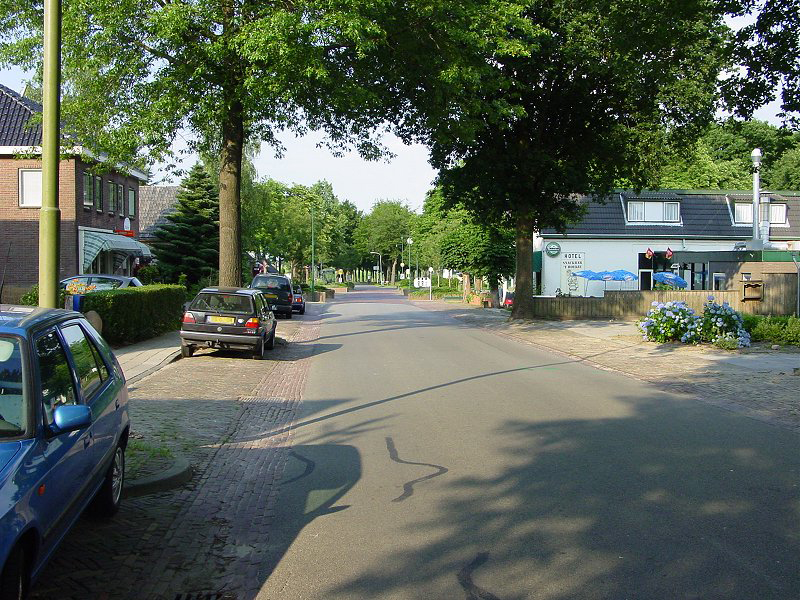
Street in Valthe

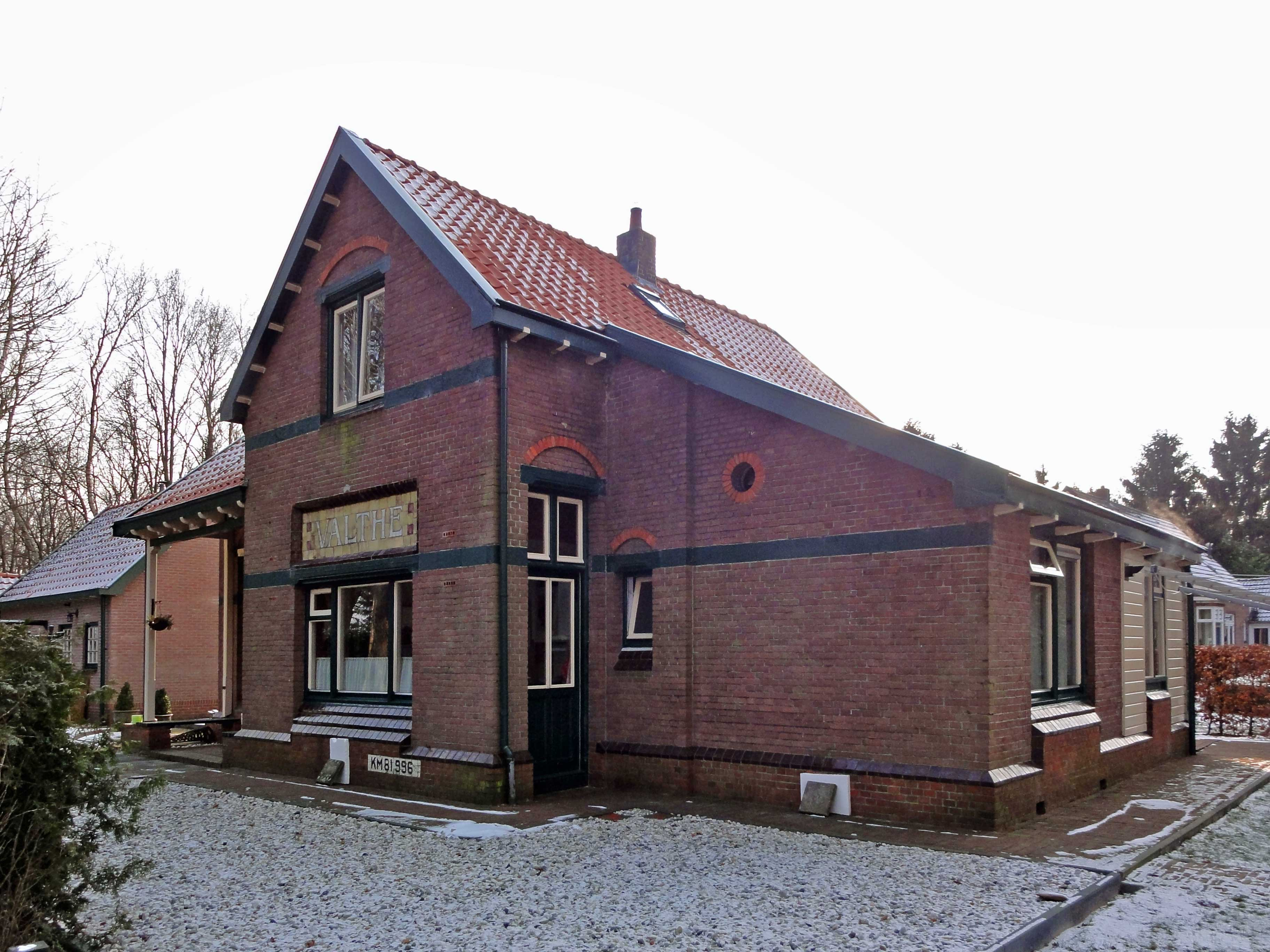
Former railway station

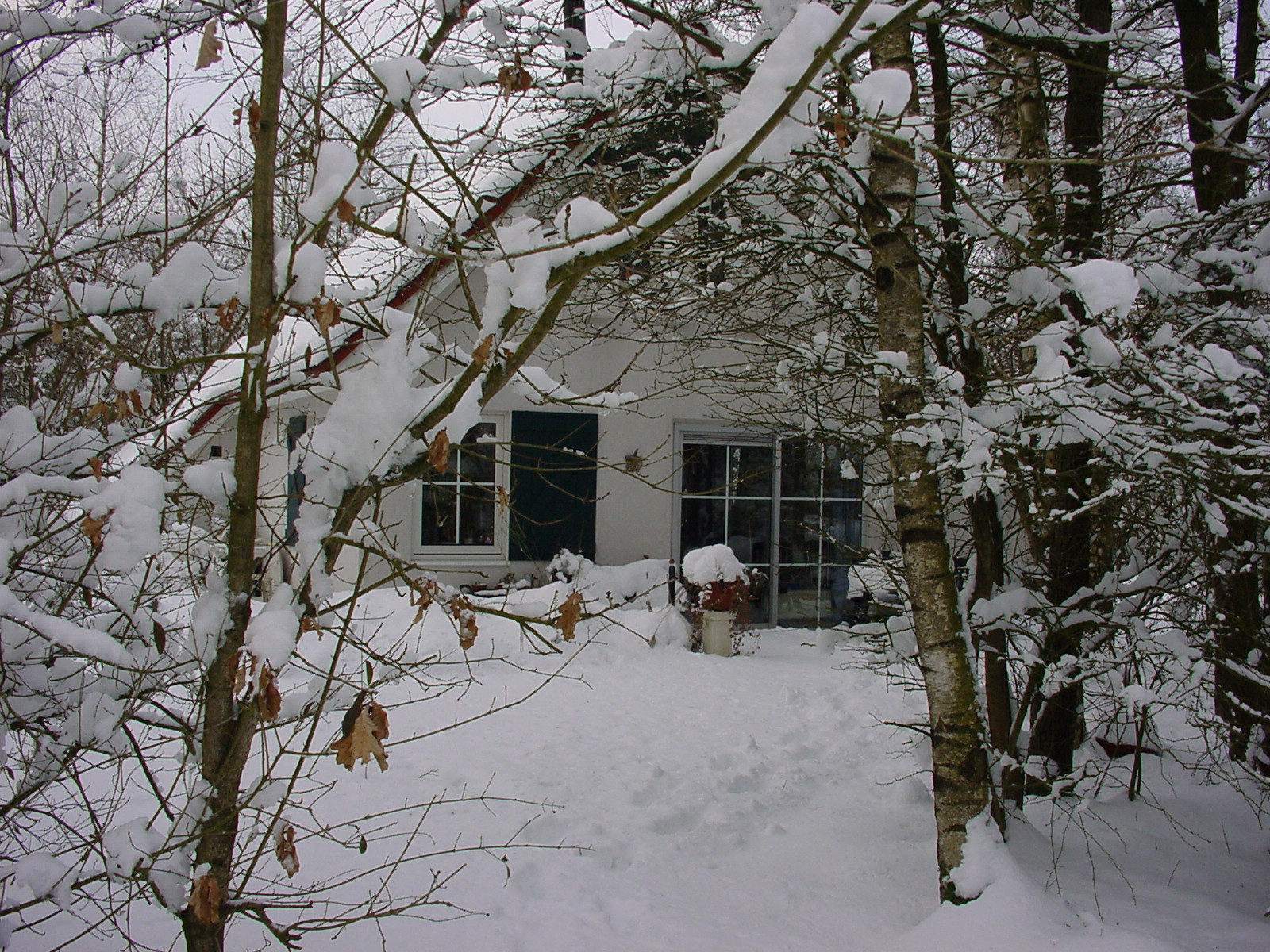
Farm in winter

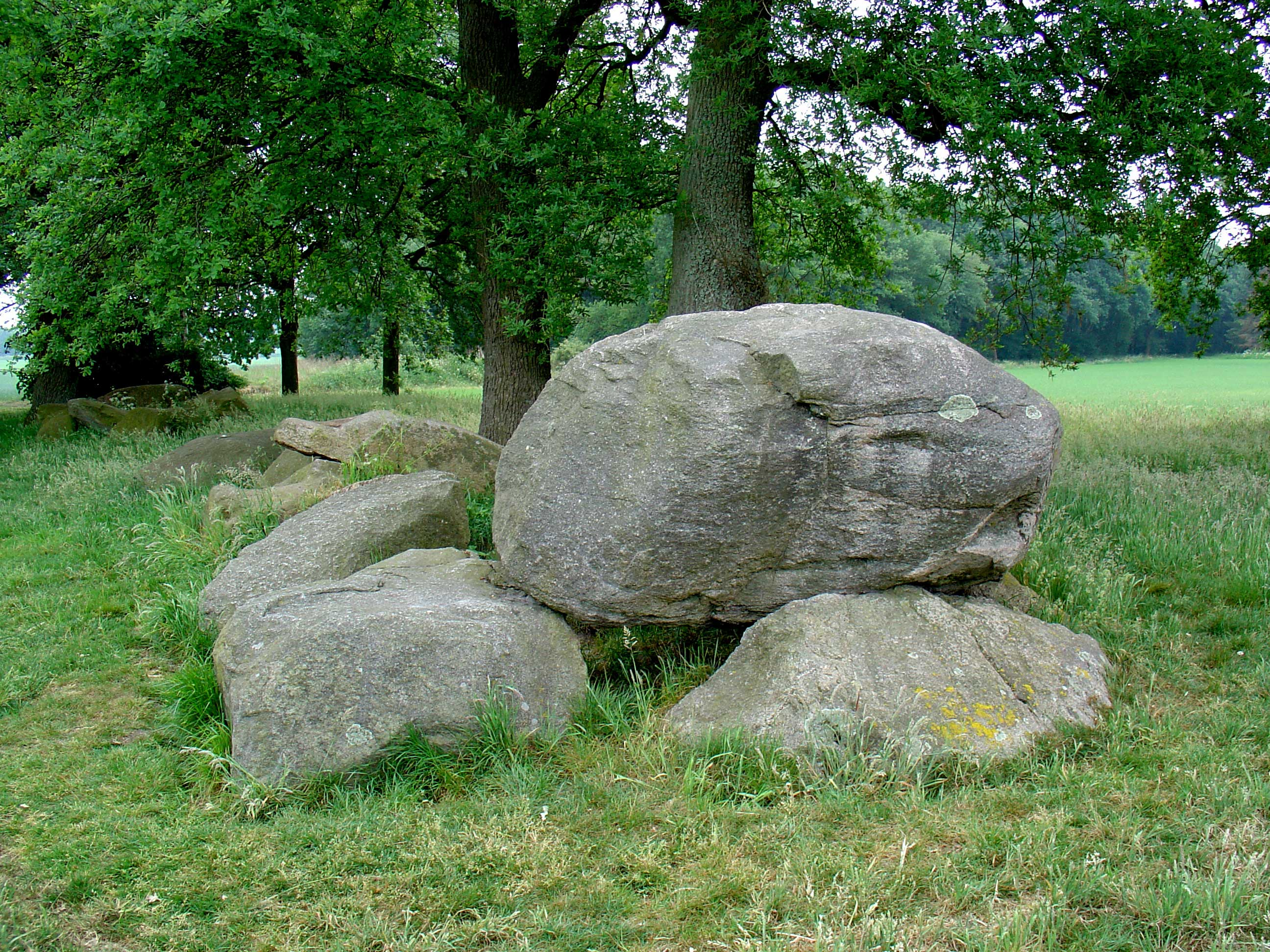
Hunebed (dolmen) D36
