= Eext =

- Village
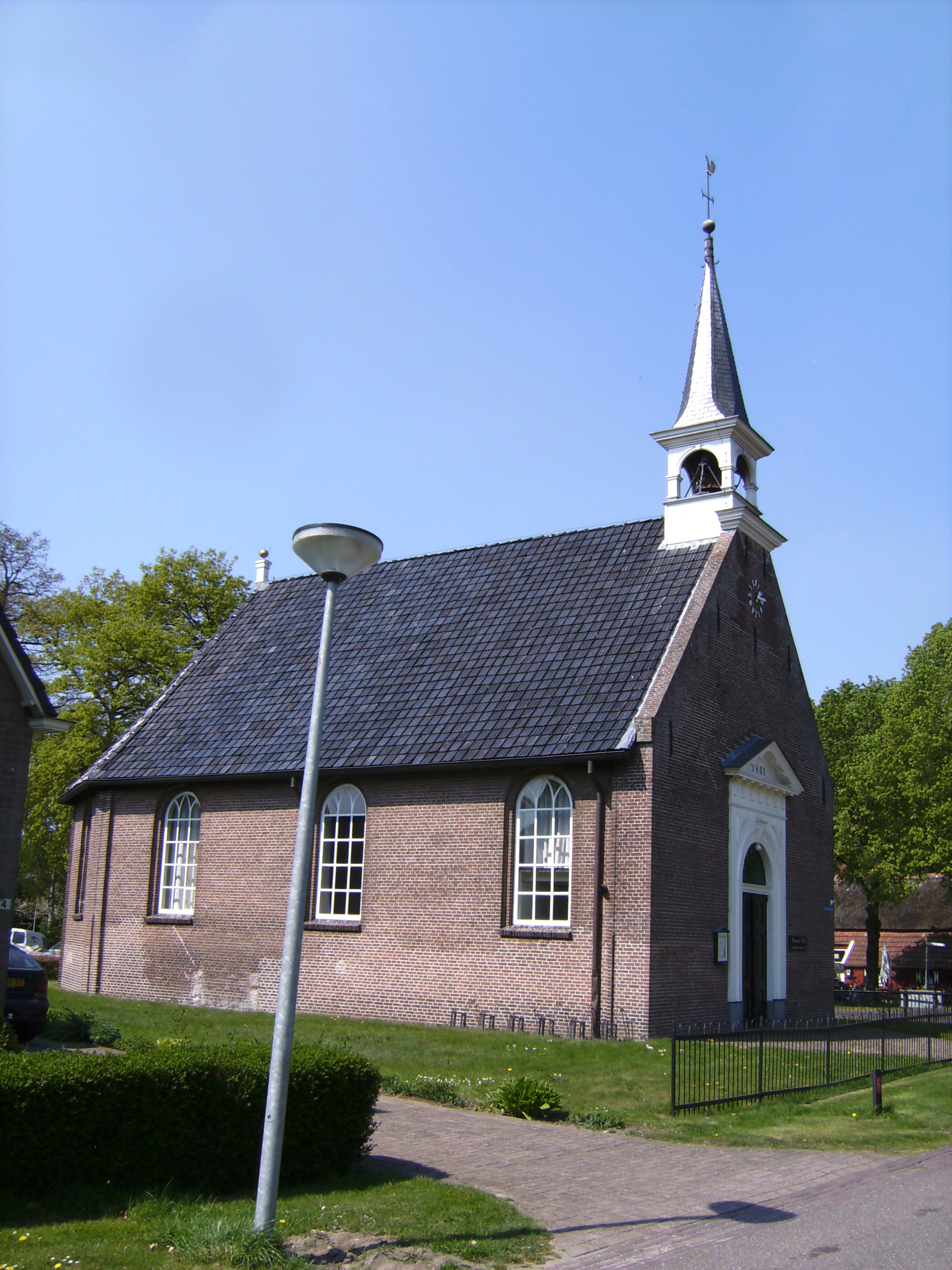
- Church

- Flag

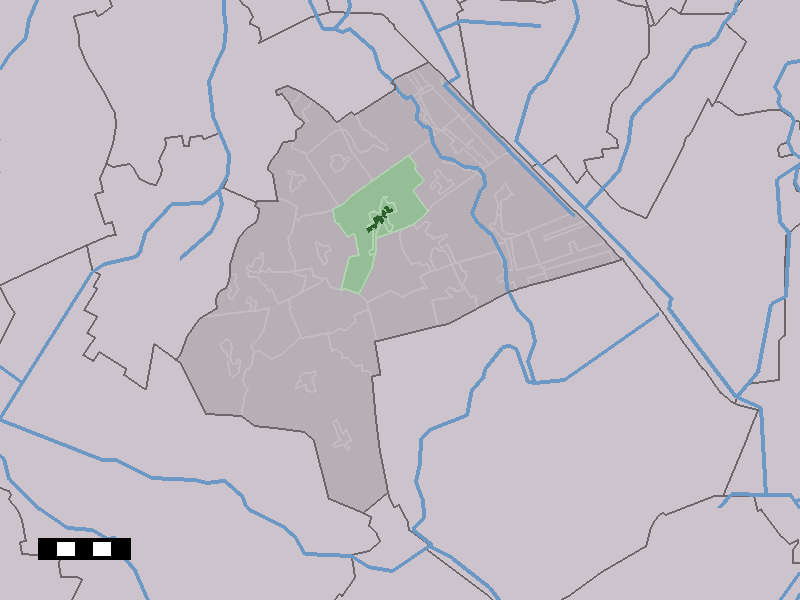
- The town centre (dark green) and the statistical district (light green) of Eext in the municipality of Aa en Hunze.

- Location in the Netherlands Eext (Netherlands)
- Coordinates: 53°1′1″N 6°44′2″E
- Country: Netherlands
- Province: Drenthe
- Municipality: Aa en Hunze

Area
  - Total: 17.89 km^{2} (6.91 sq mi)
- Elevation: 19 m (62 ft)

Population (2021)
  - Total: 1,430
  - Density: 79.9/km^{2} (207/sq mi)
- Time zone: UTC+1 (CET)
  - Summer (DST): UTC+2 (CEST)
- Postal code: 9463
- Dialing code: 0592

Eext is a village in the Dutch province of Drenthe. It is a part of the municipality of Aa en Hunze, and lies about 12 km east of Assen. There are three hunebedden (dolmen) near the village.

== History ==
The village was first mentioned in 1309 as "in villis Esethe". The etymology is unclear. Eext is an esdorp from the Early Middle Ages which is located on the Hondsrug. It has been known to exist as early as 944. It has one large brink (village square) on the south side and four smaller brinks on the north side.

The Dutch Reformed church is a simple neoclassical church from 1841.

The peat around Eext has been excavated in the 18th century, and around 1875, the heaths were cultivated.

Eext was home to 425 people in 1840. Eext used to have a railway station on the Gasselternijveen to Assen railway between 1905 and 1947. It has a building in expressionist style which is in use by the nearby camping as the reception. In the early-20th century, new rails have been laid near the station by the municipality. Since 2017, there is annual equestrian competition in the village.

== Dolmen ==
There are three hunebedden (dolmen) near Eext. The hunebed D12 is a small dolmen with three capstones. Several stones are missing. D13 is a tiny dolmen which is partially submerged. It is interesting, because it is a stair case to an underground burial chamber.

Hunebed D14 is a large dolmen with six capstones and is reasonably complete. The eastern stone used to rest on a little pillar, however it has been fixed into place by metal pins. In 2019, one of the capstones was pushed off the dolmen. It is assumed it was act of vandalism, because it could not have fallen off. As of 2021, scientists are still planning how to put it back in place.

== Transportation ==
There is no railway station any more. The nearest station is Assen station. Bus 59 operates through the village. For further information see Aa en Hunze#Transportation.

== Gallery ==
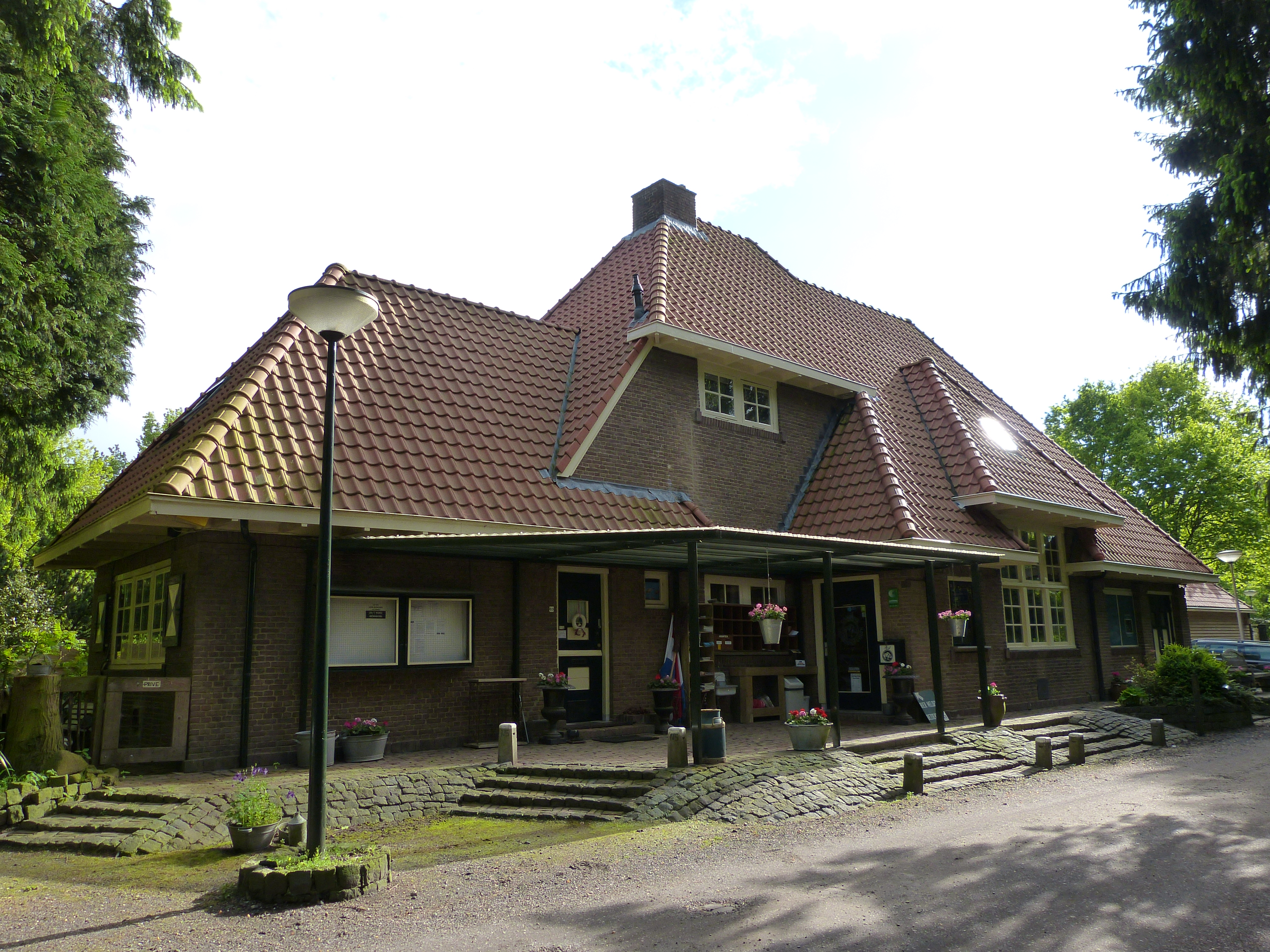
Former railway station

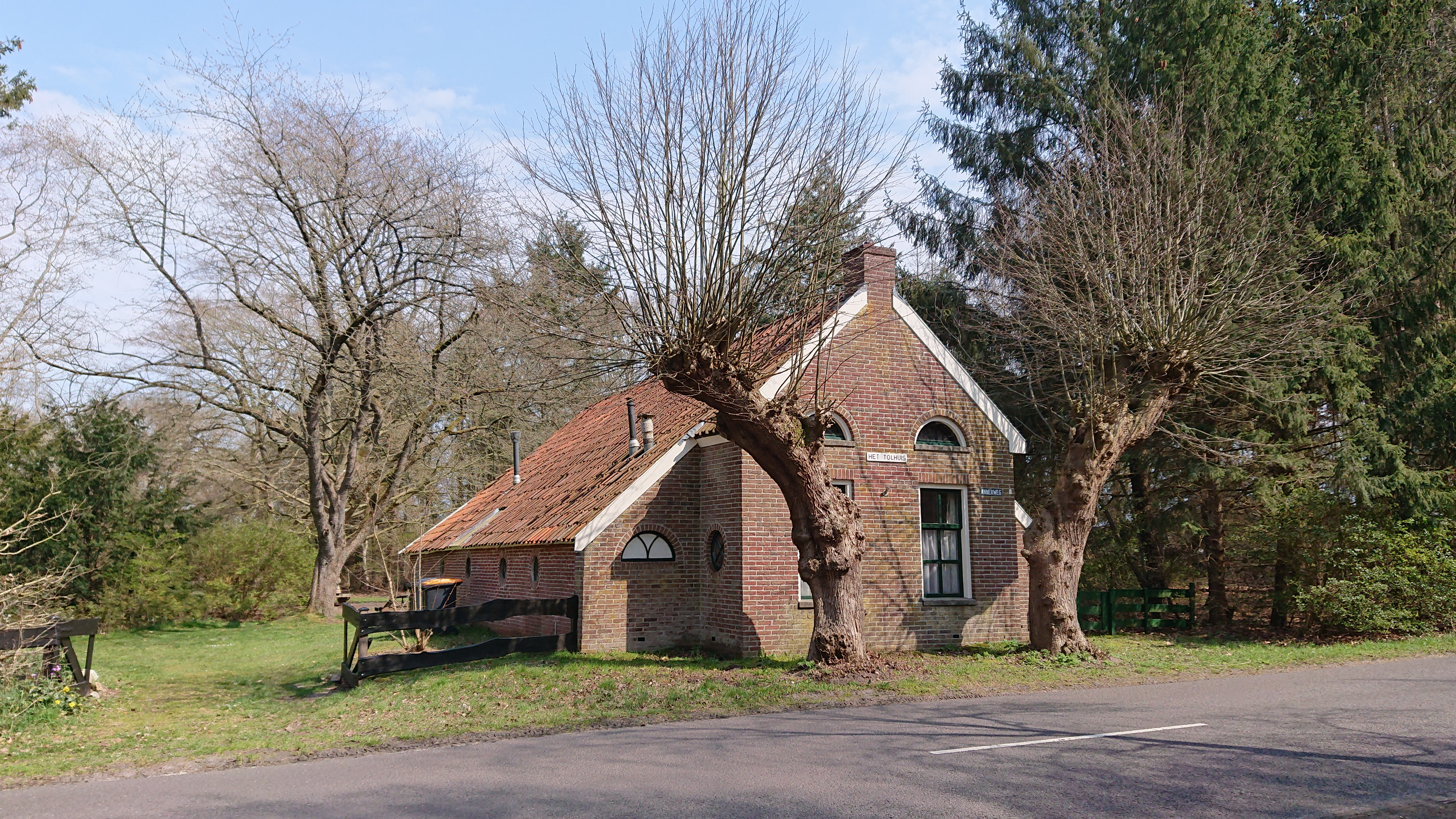
Former toll house

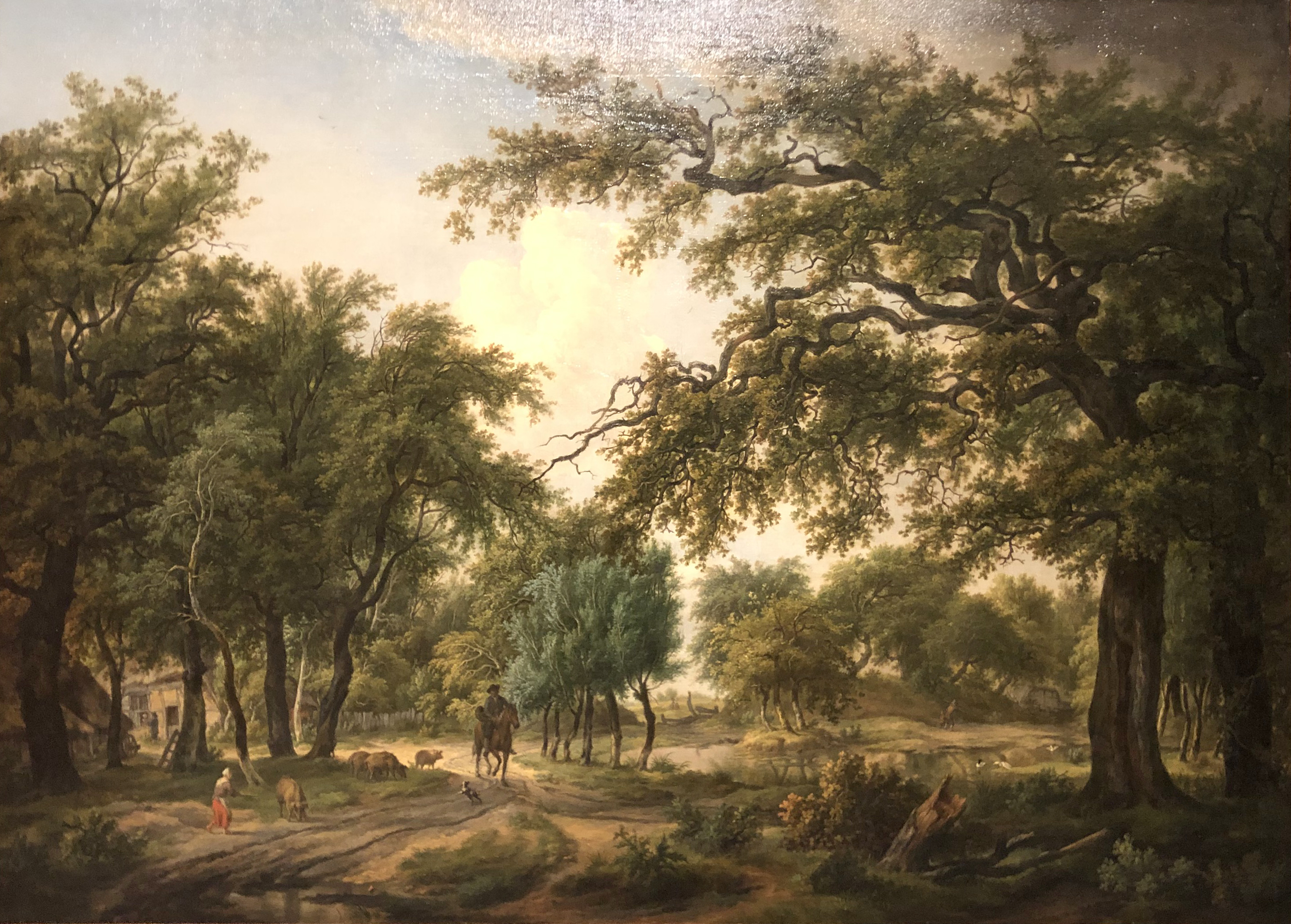
Painting of Eext by Egbert van Drielst (c. 1810)

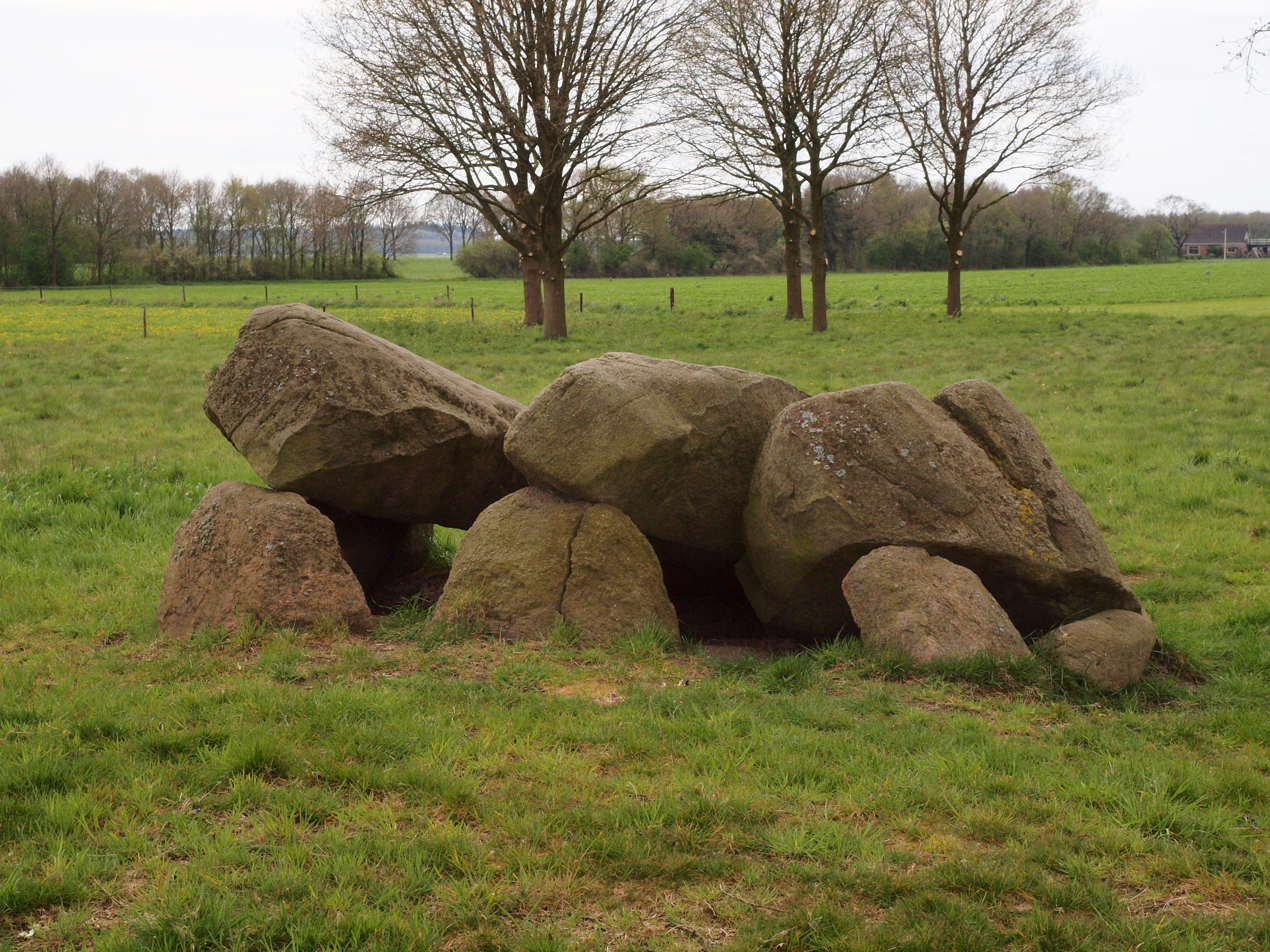
Dolmen D12
