= Loon, Drenthe =

Loon
- Village
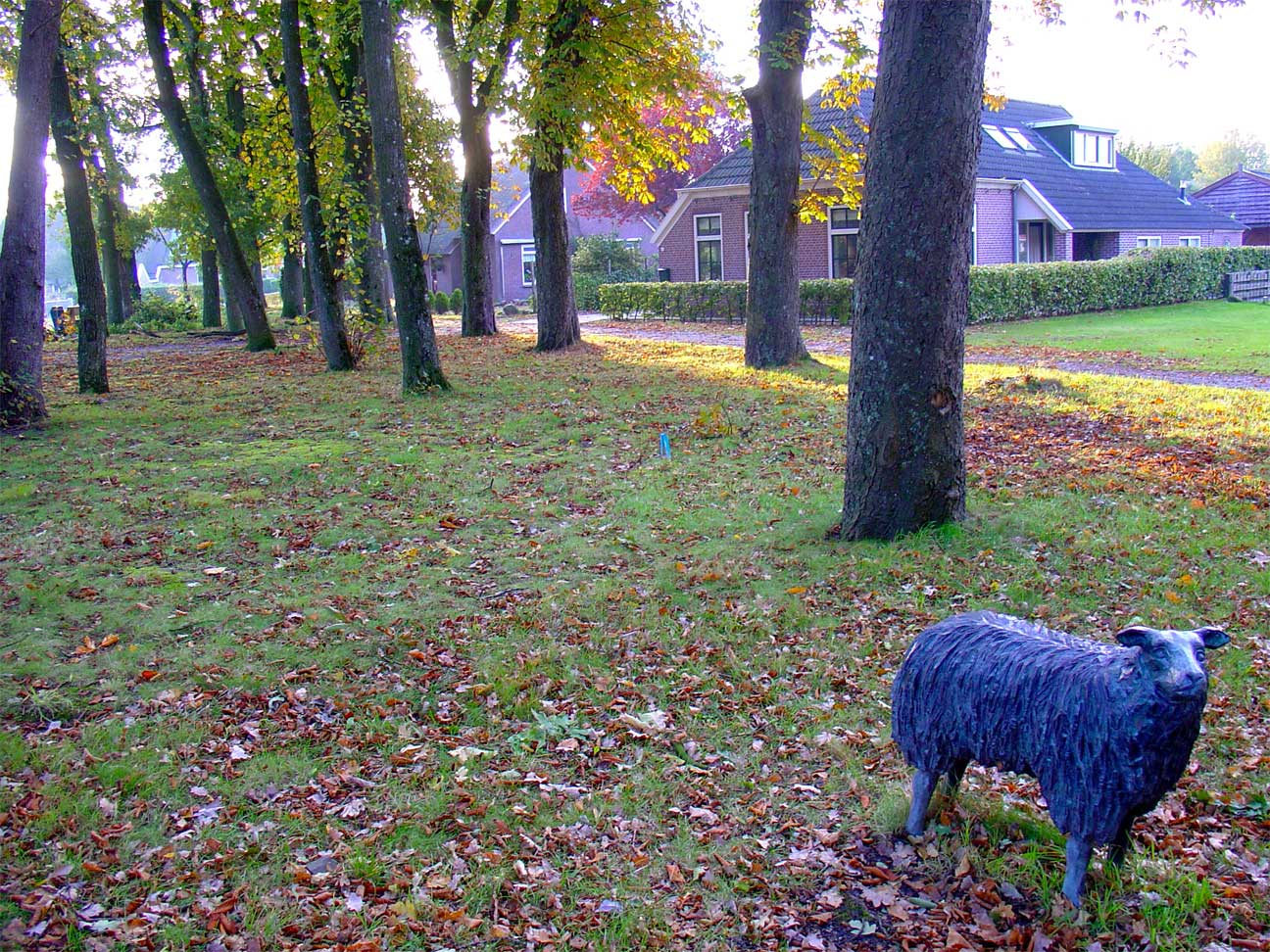
- The brink (communal pasture) of Loon with a sheep statue

- Location in province of Drenthe in the Netherlands Loon (Netherlands)
- Coordinates: 53°0′48″N 6°36′44″E
- Country: Netherlands
- Province: Drenthe
- Municipality: Assen

Area
  - Total: 4.59 km^{2} (1.77 sq mi)
- Elevation: 10 m (33 ft)

Population (2021)
  - Total: 265
  - Density: 57.7/km^{2} (150/sq mi)
- Time zone: UTC+1 (CET)
  - Summer (DST): UTC+2 (CEST)
- Postal code: 9409
- Dialing code: 0592

Loon is a village in the Netherlands and is part of the Assen municipality in Drenthe. The hunebed (dolmen) D15 is located near the village.

== Overview ==
Loon is an esdorp which developed in the early middle ages on higher grounds. It does not have a church. It was first mentioned around 1300 as "in villa Loen", and means "settlement near the forest". In 1815, it became part of the municipality of Assen. In 1840, it was home to 129 people.

Loon used to have a dairy factory and a sawmill. In the 1950s, a villa ward was added to the village. The village is nowadays on the edge of the city of Assen, however a railway line and canal provide some separation.

== Dolmen D15 ==
The hunebed (dolmen) D15 is located near the village. It was first described in 1654, but was overgrown and buried. In 1870, excavation began on the site, and four of the five capstones were still in their place, and 18 of the 23 side stones were still present. In 1974, two youths from Assen dug up bronze pottery from the dolmen. After some persuasion it was handed over to the Drents Museum where it was dated between 2450 and 2000 BC. The dolmen is clearly visible from the Meppel–Groningen railway.

== Gallery ==
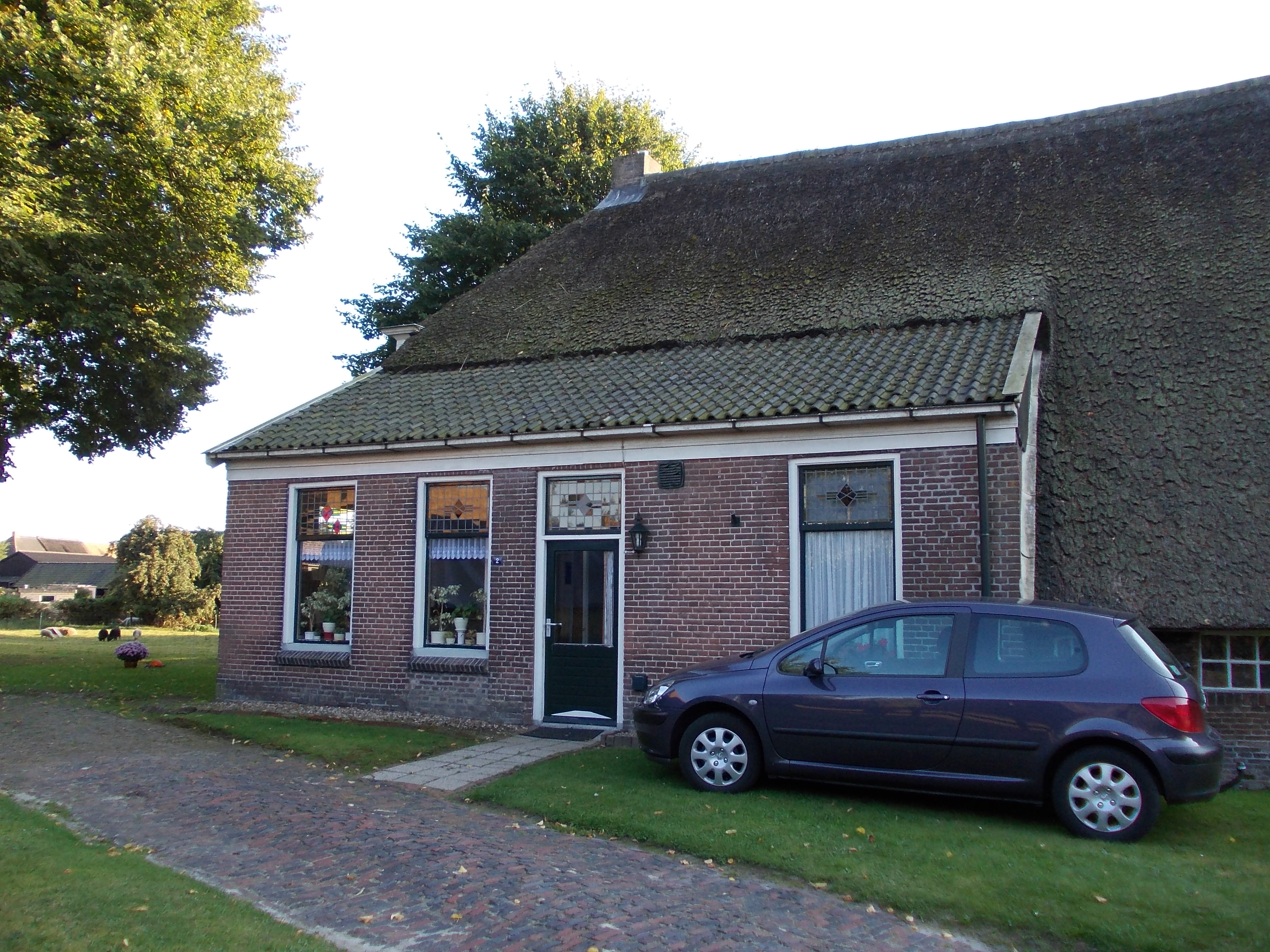
Farm in Loon

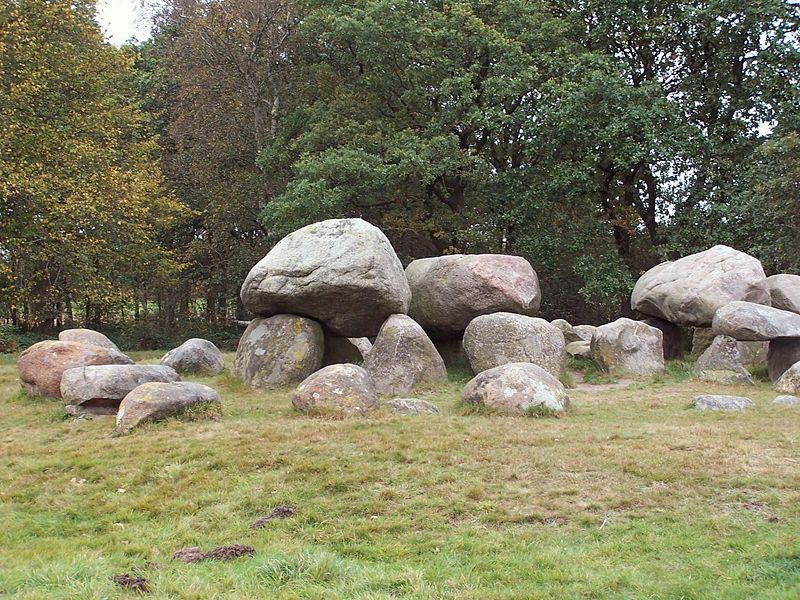
Hunebed (dolmen) D15

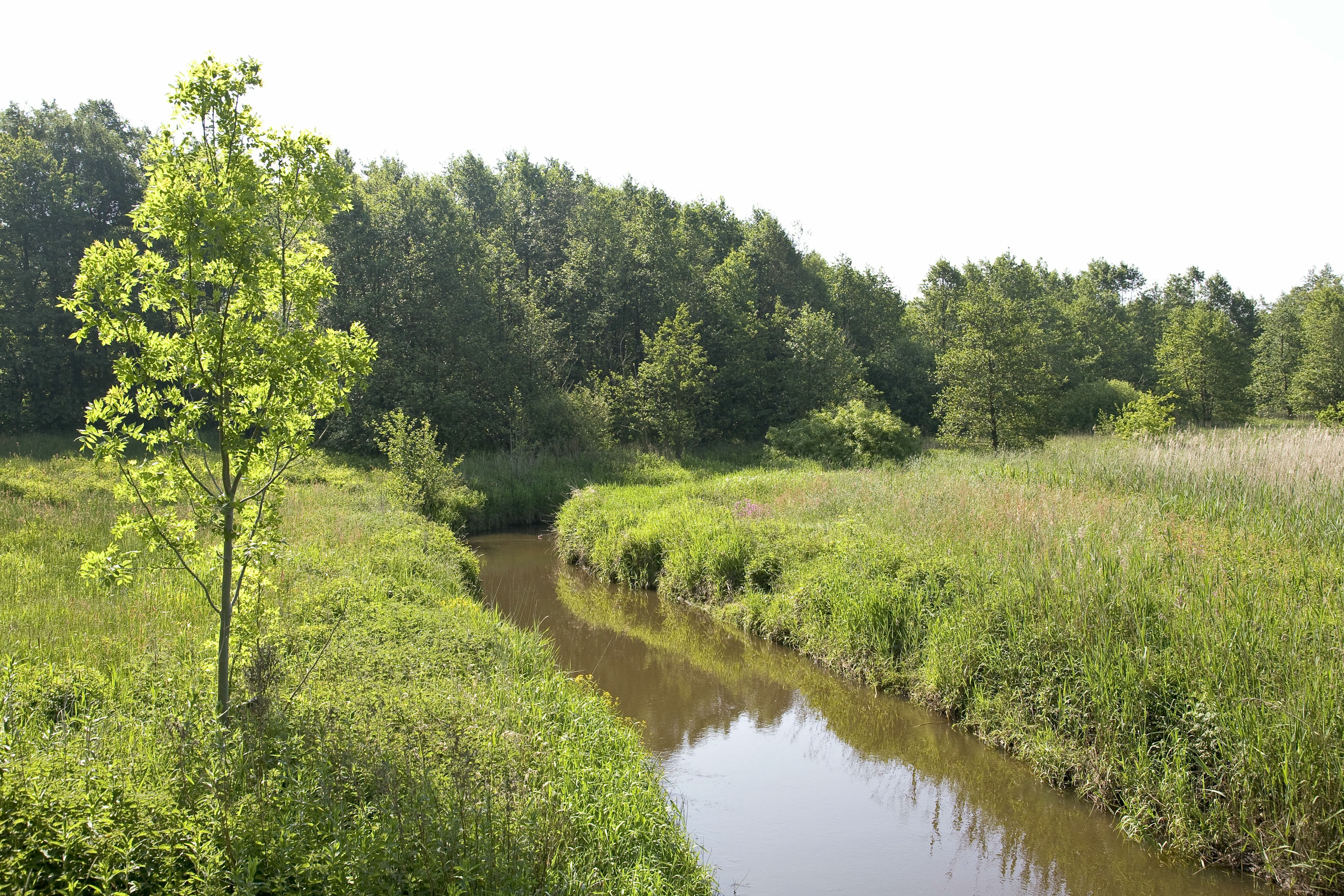
Taarlosche Diep near Loon

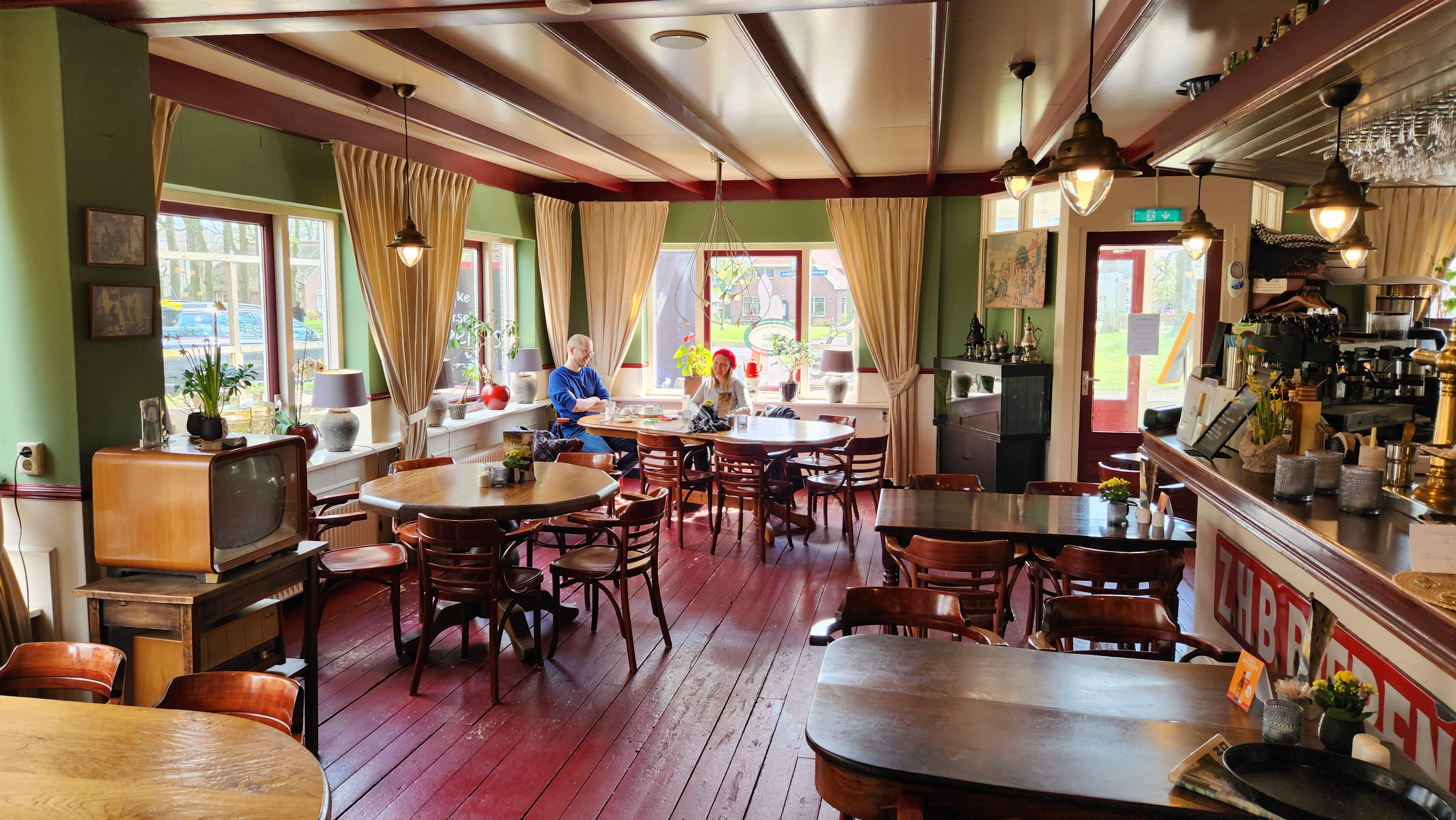
Inside De Herberg Van Loon - well known eatery
