= Cipari Archaeological Park =

Megalithic site in West Java, Indonesia

Coordinates: 6.9621°S 108.4693°E

Cipari Archaeological Park is a megalithic site in Cigugur District, Kuningan Regency, West Java, Indonesia, which is said to be dated to 1000 BCE. The site is located at around 661 meters (2,169 ft) above sea level at a distance of 4 kilometers (2.5 mi) of the town of Kuningan, West Java.
