= Westenesch =

- Hamlet
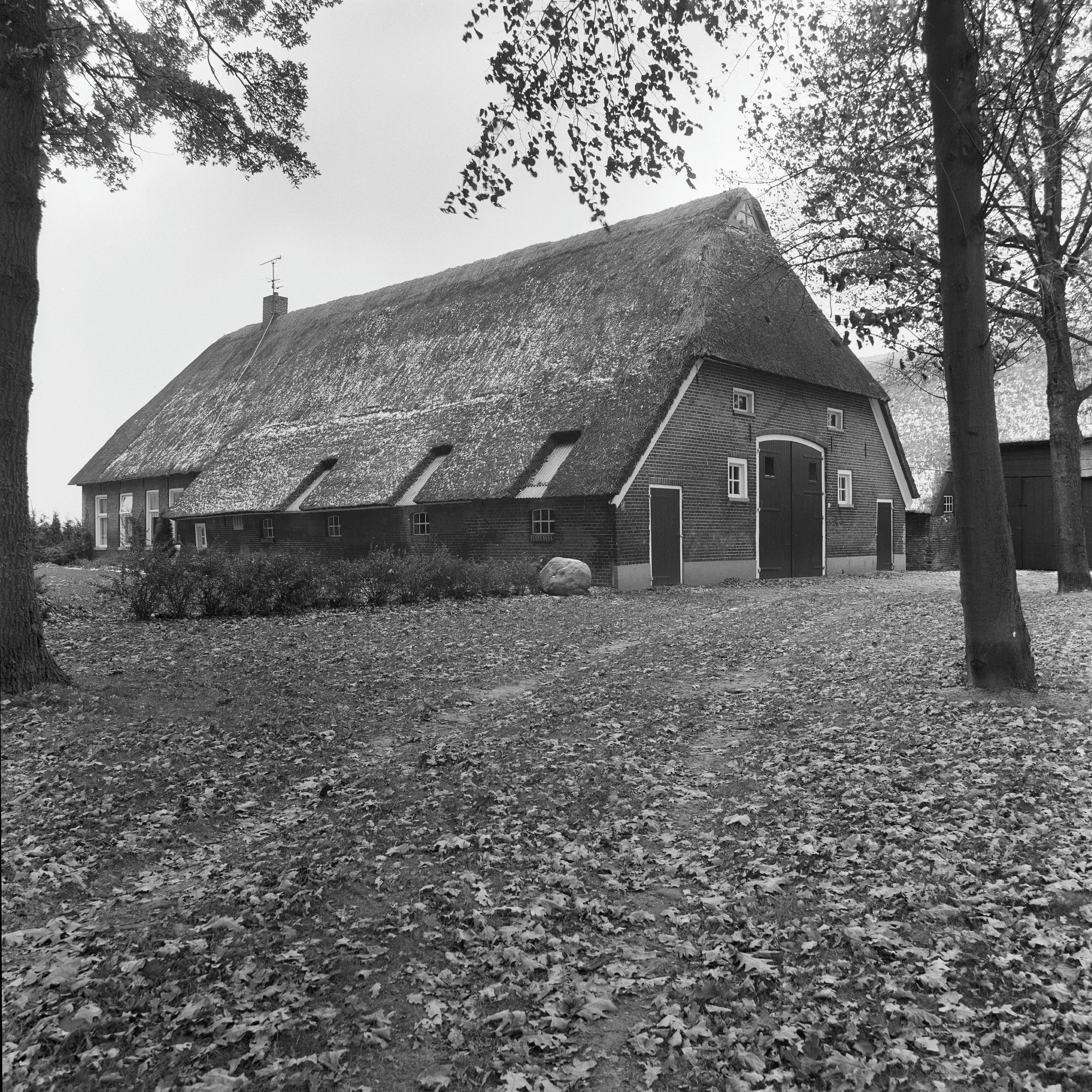
- Farm in Westenesch

- Location in province of Drenthe in the Netherlands Westenesch (Netherlands)
- Coordinates: 52°47′N 6°52′E
- Country: Netherlands
- Province: Drenthe
- Municipality: Emmen

Area
  - Total: 0.64 km^{2} (0.25 sq mi)
- Elevation: 25 m (82 ft)

Population (2021)
  - Total: 170
  - Density: 270/km^{2} (690/sq mi)
- Time zone: UTC+1 (CET)
  - Summer (DST): UTC+2 (CEST)
- Postal code: 7814
- Dialing code: 0591

Westenesch is a hamlet in the Netherlands and it is part of the Emmen municipality in Drenthe. There are two dolmen in Westenesch.

== Overview ==
Westenesch is a statistical entity, however the postal authorities have placed it under Emmen. It was first mentioned in 1362 as Westenesche, and means "western farmland". In 1932, it was home to 372 people. In 1991, the village was designated a protected site.

== Dolmen ==
There are two dolmen in Westenesch. D44 is small, however it is the only one on private property. D42 is a large dolmen with 21 side stones and 10 capstones. It originally had three gate stones. A bronze razor has been discovered at the site.

== Gallery ==
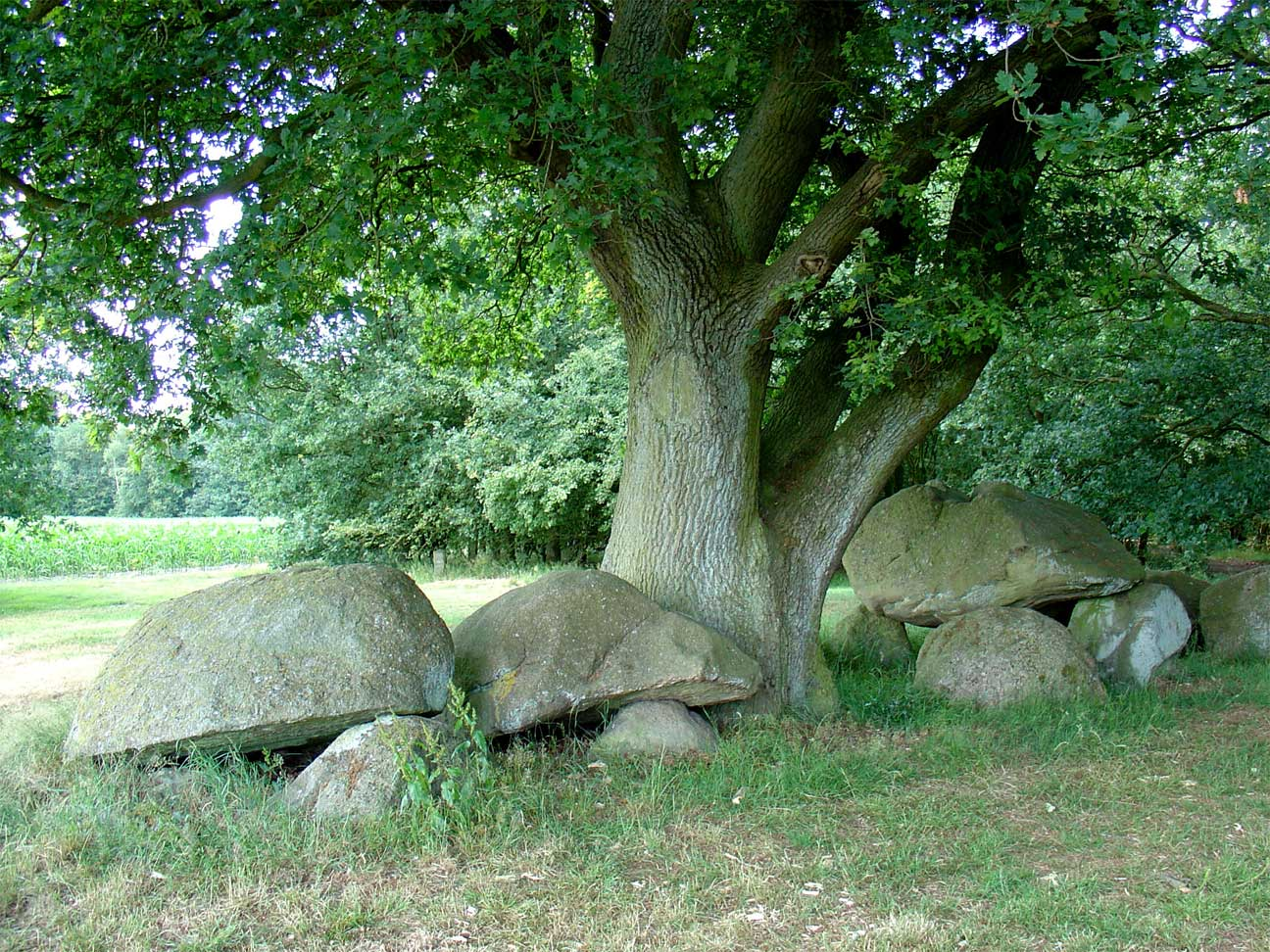
Dolmen D42

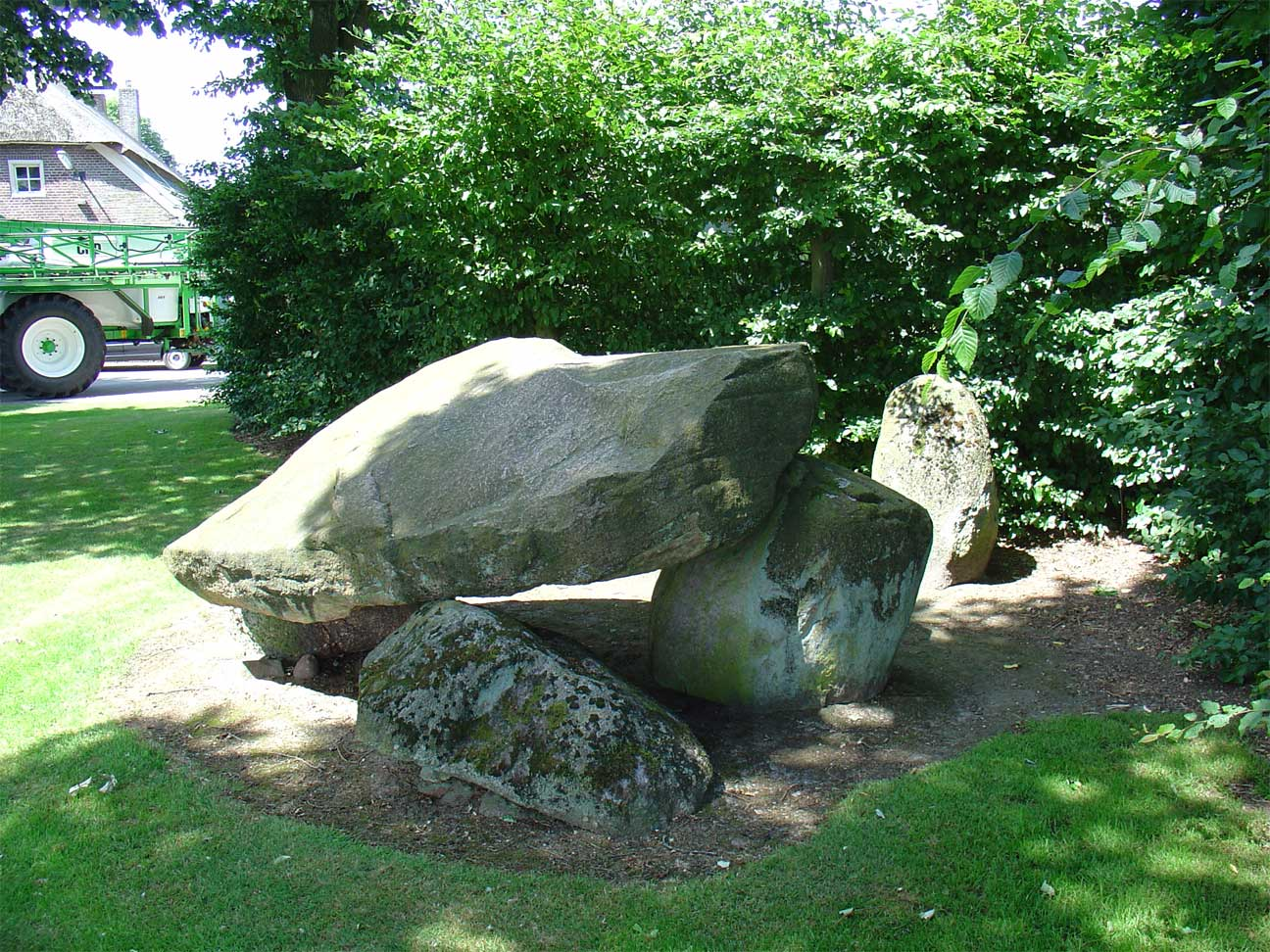
Dolmen D44
