= Borger, Netherlands =

Borger
- Village
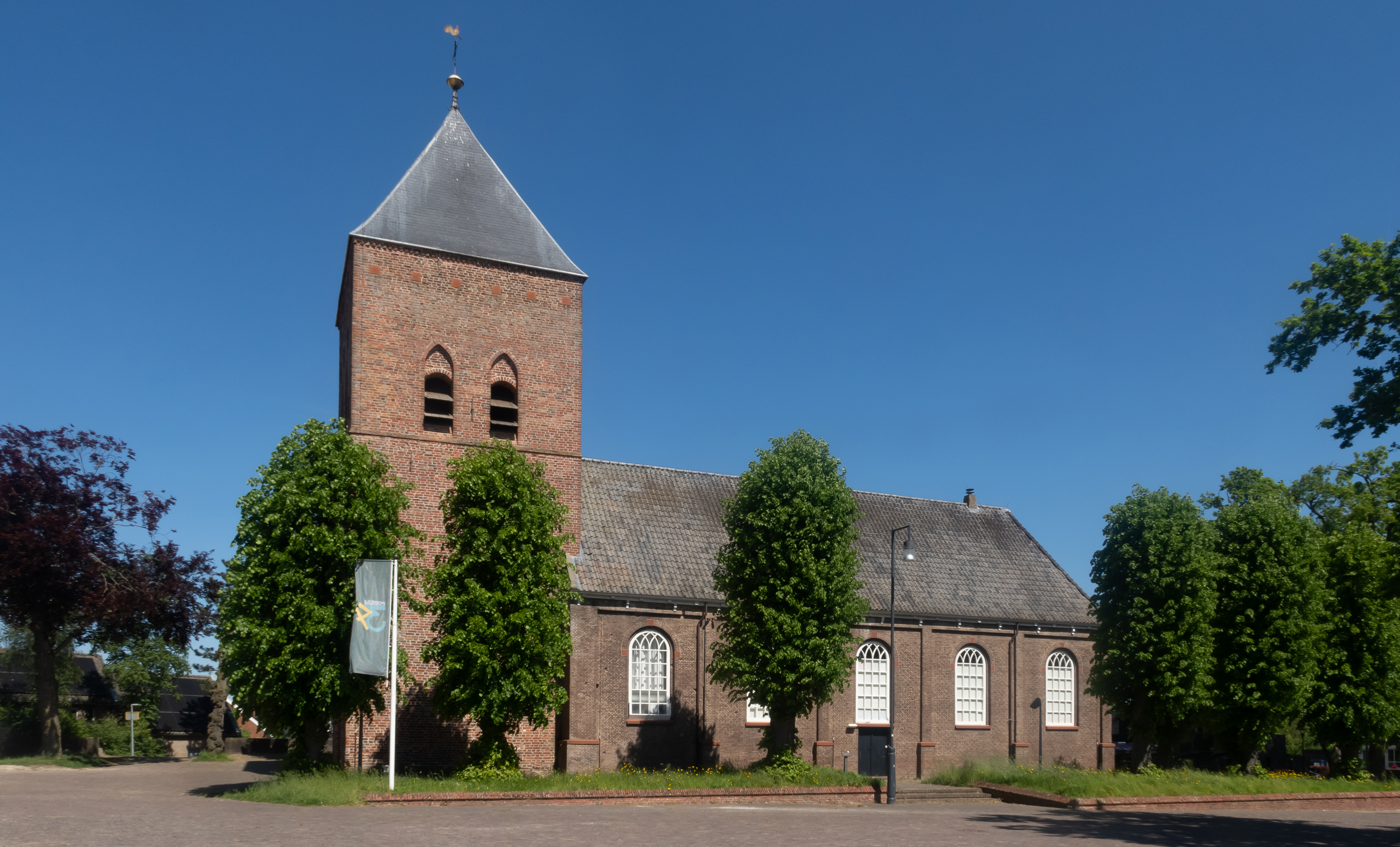
- Willibrordskerk in 2024

- Location in the province of Drenthe in the Netherlands
- Coordinates: 52°55′N 6°48′E
- Country: Netherlands
- Province: Drenthe
- Municipality: Borger-Odoorn

Area
  - Total: 15.77 km^{2} (6.09 sq mi)
- Elevation: 16 m (52 ft)

Population (2021)
  - Total: 4,885
  - Density: 309.8/km^{2} (802.3/sq mi)
- Time zone: UTC+1 (CET)
  - Summer (DST): UTC+2 (CEST)
- Postal code: 9530–9531
- Dialing code: 0599

Borger (Dutch pronunciation: [ˈbɔrɣər]) is a village in the Dutch province of Drenthe. It is a part of the municipality of Borger-Odoorn, and lies about 18 km east of Assen.

The hunebed dolmen D27 is the biggest hunebed of the Netherlands and has its own museum.

== History ==
The village was first mentioned in 1327 as "Johannes in Borghere". The etymology is unclear. Borger is an esdorp which developed in the Early Middle Ages on the Hondsrug along the road from Groningen to Coevorden. In the early 13th century a daughter church was established from Anloo. Borger became the main settlement, and three satellites were established around the village: Buinen, Drouwen and Westdorp.

The tower of the Dutch Reformed church dates from the 14th century and has been restored in 1840. The medieval church was replaced in 1826. There is an original sheep pen from the 18th century in Borger.

Borger was home to 519 people in 1840. In 1958, the open air theatre opened in Borger and can seat 600 people.

Borger used to be an independent municipality. In 1998, it was merged into Borger-Odoorn.

== Dolmen ==
The hunebed dolmen D27 is the biggest hunebed of the Netherlands. It measures 22.5 metres (74 ft) and has 9 capstones, 26 side stones and 2 keystones. The hunebed contains a complete gate. In 1865, amateur excavation was performed by Titia Brongersma who discovered pottery and many bones, however none of the artefacts remain.

In 1984, a local youth found some pottery and bones. The artefacts were analysed and surprisingly dated from the Bronze Age which was much later than expected. There were calls for a scientific investigation of the site, however the archaeologists in charge of the area have blocked an investigation. In 2005, a museum opened near the site.

There are two more smaller dolmen (D28 and D29) around Borger. Copper objects have been discovered near D28 which are the oldest discoveries of copper in the Netherlands and must have been made in Romania.

== Notable people ==
- Egbert Schuurman, philosopher and politician
- Henk G. Sol, business theorist

== Gallery ==
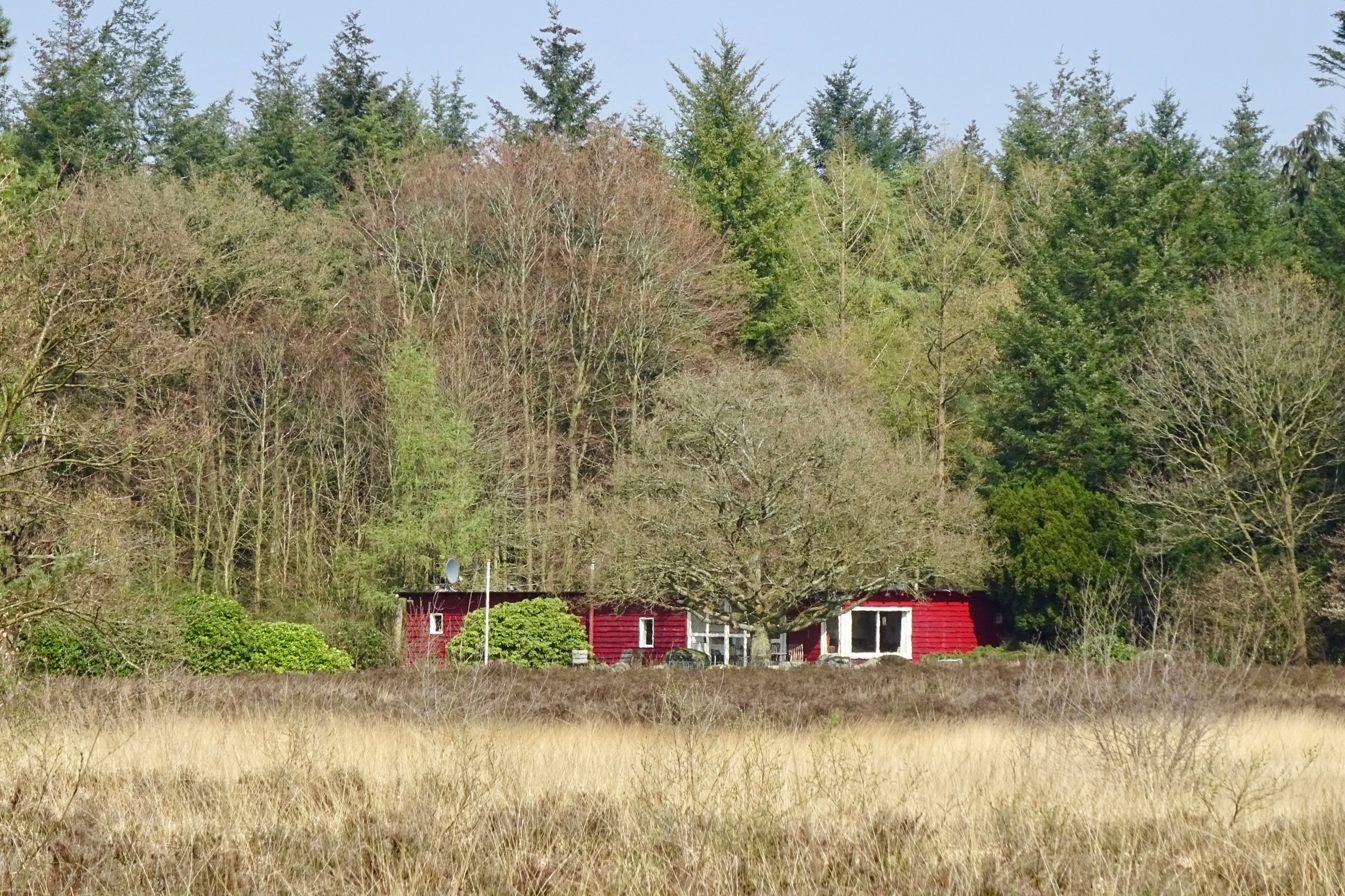
Summer house

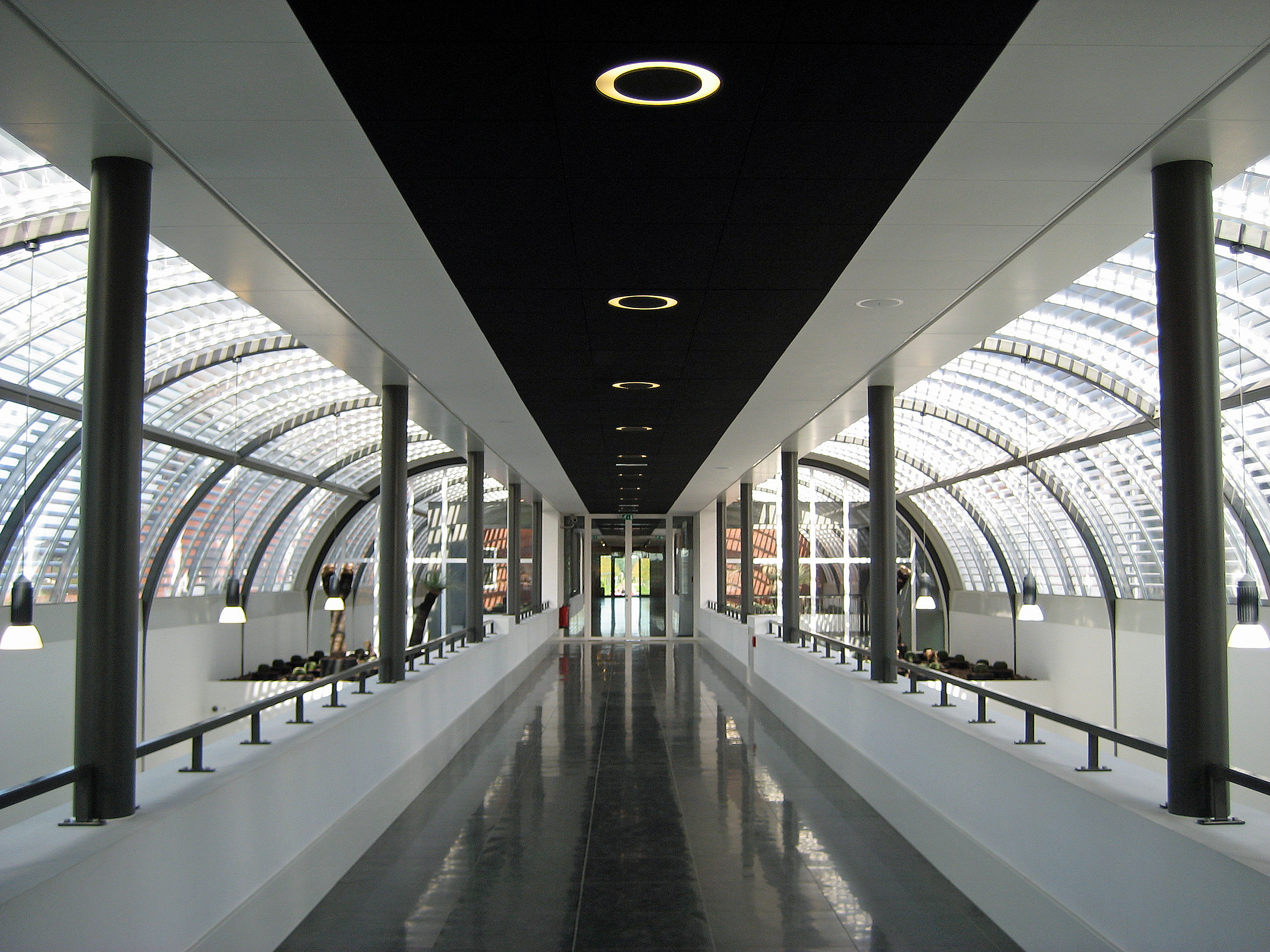
Hof van Saksen

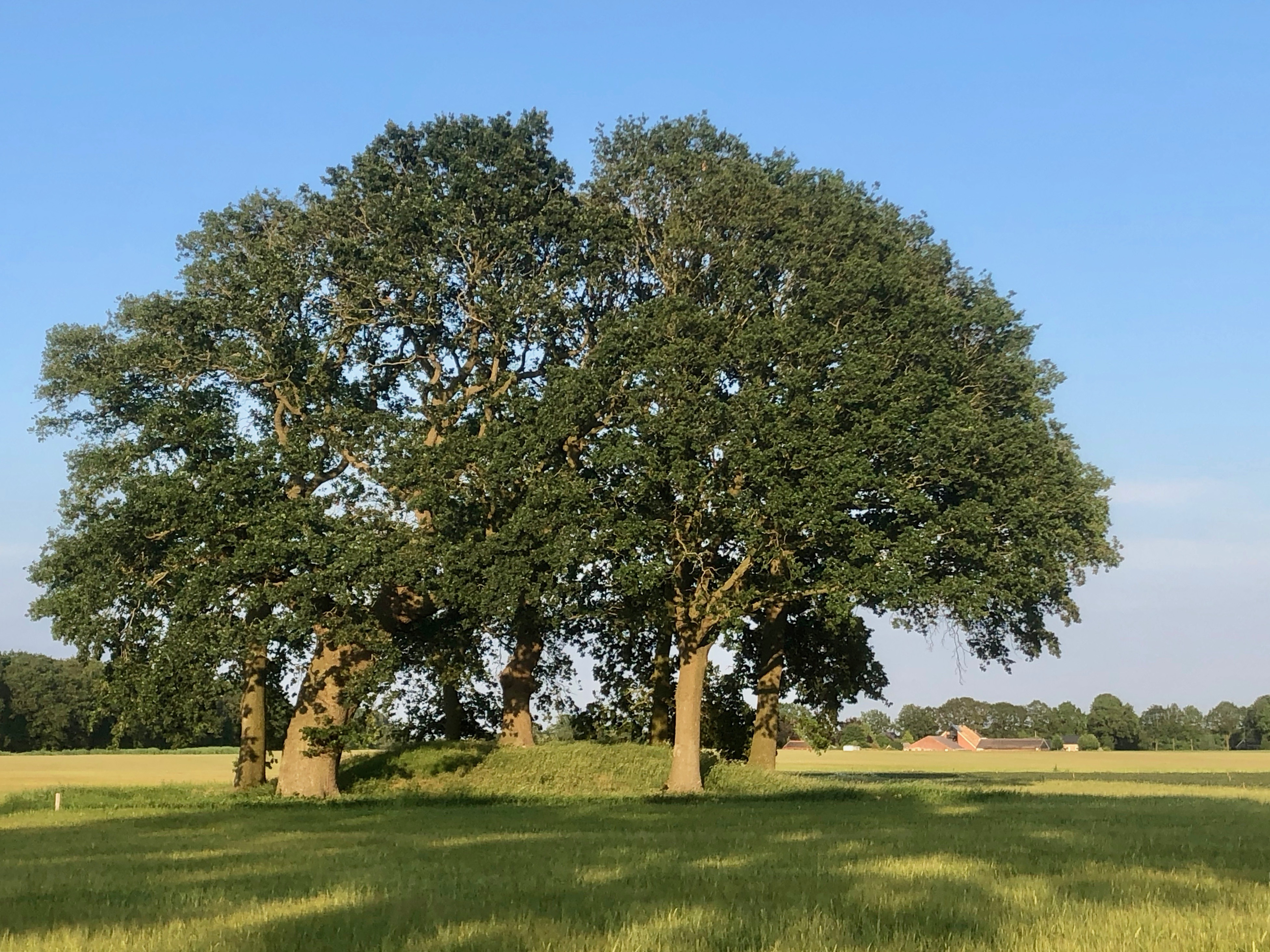
Tumulus in Borger

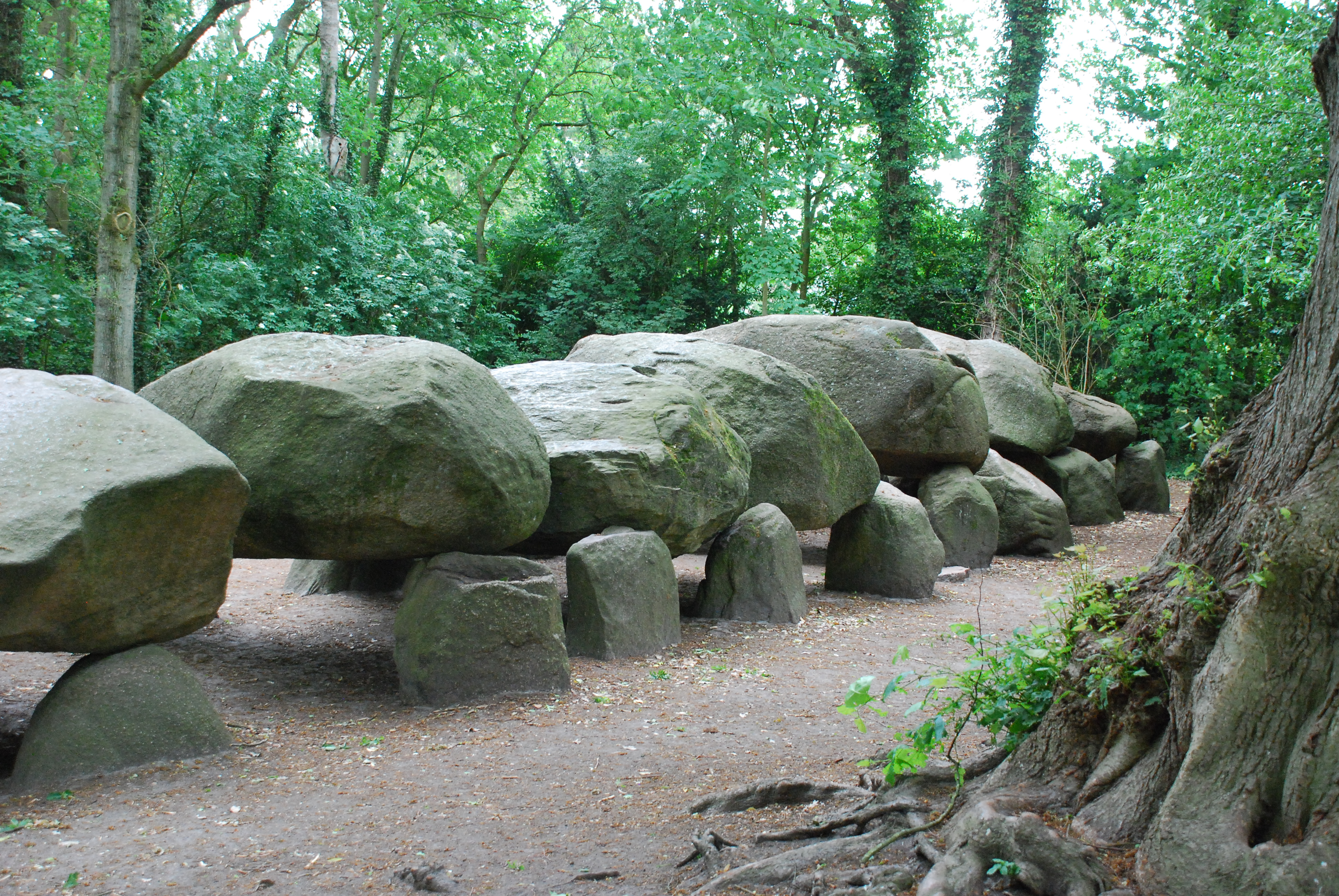
Hunebed (dolmen) D27
