= Cremlyn =

Coordinates: 53°16′22″N 4°08′29″W

- Location within Anglesey
- OS grid reference: SH 5730 7723
  - Cardiff: 130.4 mi (209.9 km)
  - London: 208.5 mi (335.5 km)
- Community: Beaumaris
- Principal area: Anglesey
- Country: Wales
- Sovereign state: United Kingdom
- Post town: Beaumaris
- Police: North Wales
- Fire: North Wales
- Ambulance: Welsh
- UK Parliament: Ynys Môn
- Senedd Cymru – Welsh Parliament: Ynys Môn

Cremlyn is an area in the community of Beaumaris, Anglesey, Wales, which is 130.4 miles (209.8 km) from Cardiff and 208.5 miles (335.6 km) from London.

== See also ==
- List of localities in Wales by population
