= Steenbergen, Noordenveld =

Steenbergen
- Village
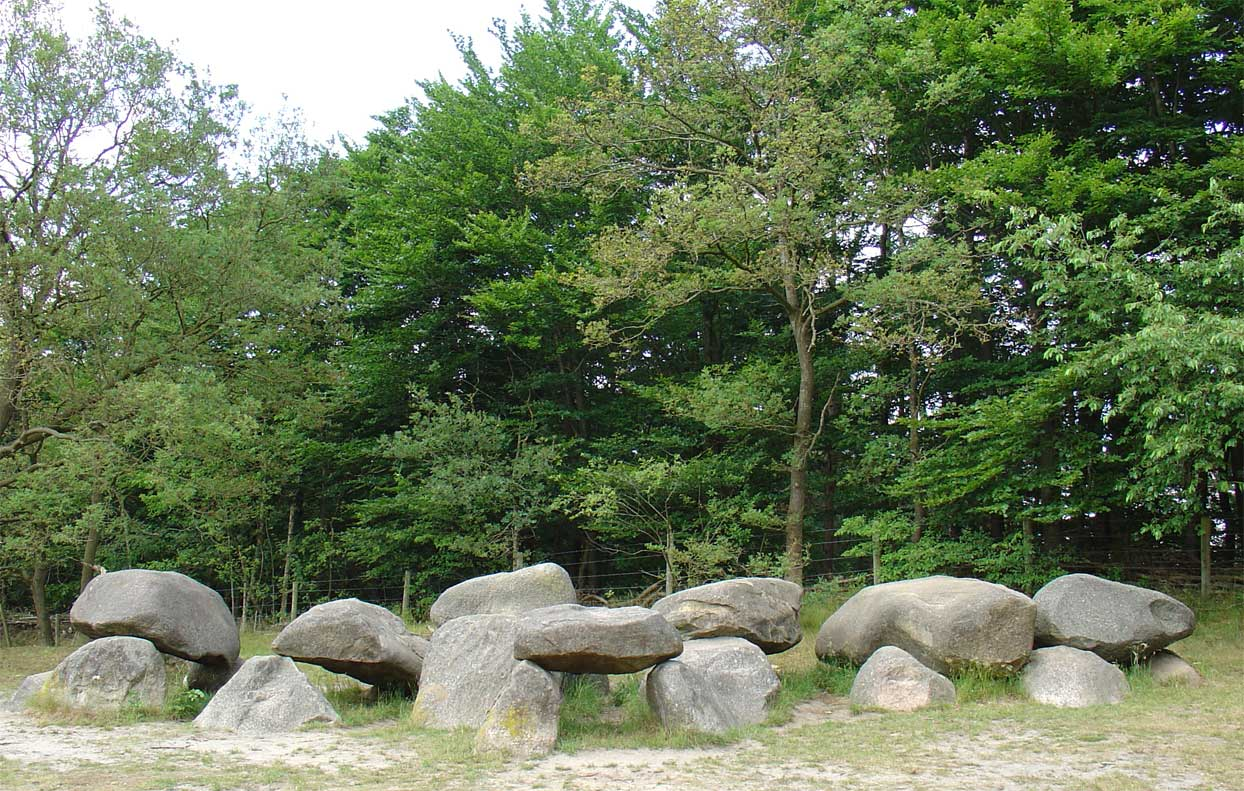
- Hunebed (dolmen) D1 near Steenbergen

- Location in province of Drenthe in the Netherlands Steenbergen (Netherlands)
- Coordinates: 53°5′58″N 6°24′30″E
- Country: Netherlands
- Province: Drenthe
- Municipality: Noordenveld

Area
  - Total: 0.13 km^{2} (0.050 sq mi)
- Elevation: 6 m (20 ft)

Population (2021)
  - Total: 85
  - Density: 650/km^{2} (1,700/sq mi)
- Time zone: UTC+1 (CET)
  - Summer (DST): UTC+2 (CEST)
- Postal code: 9307
- Dialing code: 0592

Steenbergen [ˈsteːmbɛrɣə(n)] is a village in the Netherlands and is part of the Noordenveld municipality in Drenthe. The hunebed (dolmen) D1 is located near the village.

== History ==
Steenbergen is an esdorp without a church, and has been inhabited since pre-history. The village was first mentioned in 1531 as "van Steenberghen" which means "mountain of stone" and is a reference to the dolmen. It was originally a satellite of Roden, but became independent in the 17th century. It was shepherd's village who kept sheep on the heath surrounding the village. In 1840, it was home to 84 people.

== Dolmen D1 ==
D1 was first described in a journal by Nicolaus Westendorp in 1811, however given the etymology it was discovered much earlier. The ground has never been explored scientifically. It contains 12 side stones and 6 capstones. In 1997, a fire was lit underneath the stones which caused one of the capstones to crack. It has been repaired and placed back with metal pins.

There's another little dolmen in the village, however it has been constructed by a local resident, and is fake.
