= Puccinia pittieriana =

Scientific classification
- Domain: Eukaryota
- Kingdom: Fungi
- Division: Basidiomycota
- Class: Pucciniomycetes
- Order: Pucciniales
- Family: Pucciniaceae
- Genus: Puccinia
- Species: P. pittieriana

Binomial name
- Puccinia pittieriana Henn., (1904)

Synonyms
- Mainsia pittieriana; Micropuccinia pittieriana; Spirechina pittieriana

Species of fungus

Puccinia pittieriana is a species of rust fungus. It is a plant pathogen which infects agricultural crops such as potato and tomato. Its common names include common potato rust and common potato and tomato rust.

This fungus was first made known to science in 1904 when it was collected from potatoes (Solanum tuberosum) in cultivation on the slopes of Irazú Volcano in Costa Rica. It was later found on wild potato species such as Solanum demissum and on tomato crops. It is now known from Central and South America and from Mexico. Its known hosts now include many wild and cultivated species of Solanum. This is the only rust fungus that infects tomatoes.

Fungal infection manifests as greenish white spots a few millimeters wide on the undersides of a plant's leaves. The upper surfaces of the leaves may be dimpled as the lesions penetrate the blades. The lesions turn whitish with red to brown centers. The lesions spread across the leaf, which then dies and falls. Lesions can also form on the petioles, stems, flowers, and fruits.

The fungal spores are borne on the wind and infect plants when the plant surface is moist and the average temperature is around 10 °C. Symptoms appear in about two weeks and the lesions are largest by 20 to 25 days after infection by spores.

Several potato cultivars are resistant to the rust.

== See also ==
- List of Puccinia species
