= ECPD =

ECPD may refer to:

- Engineers' Council for Professional Development
- El Cajon Police Department
- European Cultivated Potato Database
