= Solanum bulbocastanum =

Scientific classification
- Kingdom: Plantae
- Clade: Embryophytes
- Clade: Tracheophytes
- Clade: Angiosperms
- Clade: Eudicots
- Clade: Asterids
- Order: Solanales
- Family: Solanaceae
- Genus: Solanum
- Species: S. bulbocastanum

Binomial name
- Solanum bulbocastanum Dunal

Species of flowering plant

Solanum bulbocastanum, the ornamental nightshade, is a plant in the family Solanaceae, native to Mexico and parts of the U.S. Southwest.

It is closely related to the potato and, as it has evolved strong resistance to all known varieties of potato blight, has been used to genetically engineer resistance into the cultivated varieties of potatoes around the world. The use of genetic engineering is helpful, as efforts to hybridize by traditional methods have so far been unsuccessful, and the use of somatic hybridization to transfer genes is difficult. A resistance to the Columbia root-knot nematode Meloidogyne chitwoodi has been identified in S. bulbocastanum, which can be transferred to cultivated potato. Furthermore, a 2025 study selected S. bulbocastanum as a leading candidate for de novo domestication as a stress- and disease-resistant potato crop, rather than transferring individual resistance genes into cultivated potato.
