= Taxonomic synonyms of Solanum tuberosum =

Classification of potatoes

The potato, Solanum tuberosum, has at least 438 taxonomic synonyms, as listed by the Royal Botanic Gardens, Kew website Plants of the World Online.

== Synonyms ==
The attribution after each synonym is to the authors who first described the species under that name.

- Battata tuberosa Hill ex B.D.Jacks.
- Larnax sylvarum subsp. novogranatensis N.W.Sawyer
- Lycopersicon tuberosum (L.) Mill.
- Parmentiera edulis Raf.
- Solanum andigenum Juz. & Bukasov
- Solanum andigenum convar. acutifolium Lechn.
- Solanum andigenum convar. adpressipilosum Lechn.
- Solanum andigenum f. alccai-huarmi Bukasov & Lechn.
- Solanum andigenum f. ancacc-maquin Bukasov & Lechn.
- Solanum andigenum f. arcuatum Bukasov & Lechn.
- Solanum andigenum subsp. argentinicum Lechn.
- Solanum andigenum subsp. australiperuvianum Lechn.
- Solanum andigenum subsp. aya-papa Bukasov & Lechn.
- Solanum andigenum var. aymaranum Bukasov & Lechn.
- Solanum andigenum f. basiscopum Bukasov & Lechn.
- Solanum andigenum f. bifidum Bukasov & Lechn.
- Solanum andigenum var. bolivianum Bukasov & Lechn.
- Solanum andigenum subsp. bolivianum Lechn.
- Solanum andigenum convar. brachistylum Lechn.
- Solanum andigenum convar. brevicalyces Lechn.
- Solanum andigenum var. brevicalyx Bukasov & Lechn.
- Solanum andigenum convar. brevipilosum Lechn.
- Solanum andigenum f. caesium Bukasov & Lechn.
- Solanum andigenum f. caiceda Bukasov
- Solanum andigenum var. carhua Vargas
- Solanum andigenum f. ccompetillo Bukasov & Lechn.
- Solanum andigenum f. ccompis Bukasov & Lechn.
- Solanum andigenum var. ccusi Bukasov & Lechn.
- Solanum andigenum subsp. centraliperuvianum Lechn.
- Solanum andigenum f. cevallosii Bukasov & Lechn.
- Solanum andigenum f. chalcoense Bukasov
- Solanum andigenum f. chimaco Bukasov & Lechn.
- Solanum andigenum var. ckello-huaccoto Bukasov & Lechn.
- Solanum andigenum f. coeruleum Lechn. ex Bukasov
- Solanum andigenum var. colombianum Bukasov
- Solanum andigenum subsp. colombianum (Bukasov) Lechn.
- Solanum andigenum f. conicicolumnatum Bukasov & Lechn.
- Solanum andigenum f. cryptostylum Bukasov & Lechn.
- Solanum andigenum convar. curtibaccatum Lechn.
- Solanum andigenum var. cuzcoense Bukasov & Lechn.
- Solanum andigenum var. digitotuberosum Vargas
- Solanum andigenum f. dilatatum Bukasov & Lechn.
- Solanum andigenum f. discolor Bukasov & Lechn.
- Solanum andigenum subsp. ecuatorianum Lechn.
- Solanum andigenum convar. elongatibaccatum Lechn.
- Solanum andigenum f. elongatipedicellatum Lechn.
- Solanum andigenum f. globosum Bukasov & Lechn.
- Solanum andigenum var. grauense Vargas
- Solanum andigenum f. guatemalense Bukasov
- Solanum andigenum var. hederiforme Bukasov
- Solanum andigenum var. herrerae Bukasov & Lechn.
- Solanum andigenum f. huaca-layra Bukasov & Lechn.
- Solanum andigenum var. huairuru Bukasov & Lechn.
- Solanum andigenum f. huallata Bukasov & Lechn.
- Solanum andigenum f. huaman-uma Bukasov & Lechn.
- Solanum andigenum var. imilla Bukasov & Lechn.
- Solanum andigenum f. incrassatum Bukasov & Lechn.
- Solanum andigenum var. juninum Bukasov
- Solanum andigenum f. lanciacuminatum Bukasov & Lechn.
- Solanum andigenum f. lapazense Bukasov & Lechn.
- Solanum andigenum var. latius Bukasov & Lechn.
- Solanum andigenum f. lecke-umo Bukasov & Lechn.
- Solanum andigenum f. lilacinoflorum Bukasov
- Solanum andigenum f. lisarassa Bukasov
- Solanum andigenum f. llutuc-runtum Lechn. ex Bukasov
- Solanum andigenum convar. longiacuminatum Lechn.
- Solanum andigenum var. longibaccatum Bukasov & Lechn.
- Solanum andigenum convar. macron Lechn.
- Solanum andigenum f. magnicorollatum Bukasov & Lechn.
- Solanum andigenum var. mexicanum Bukasov
- Solanum andigenum f. microstigma Bukasov & Lechn.
- Solanum andigenum convar. microstigmatum Lechn.
- Solanum andigenum f. nodosum Bukasov
- Solanum andigenum convar. nudiculum Lechn.
- Solanum andigenum convar. obtusiacuminatum Lechn.
- Solanum andigenum f. ovatibaccatum Bukasov & Lechn.
- Solanum andigenum f. pacus Lechn. ex Bukasov
- Solanum andigenum f. pallidum Bukasov & Lechn.
- Solanum andigenum var. platyantherum Bukasov & Lechn.
- Solanum andigenum f. pomacanchicum Bukasov & Lechn.
- Solanum andigenum f. ppacc-nacha Bukasov & Lechn.
- Solanum andigenum f. ppaqui Bukasov & Lechn.
- Solanum andigenum convar. puca-mata Lechn.
- Solanum andigenum var. quechuanum Bukasov & Lechn.
- Solanum andigenum var. sihuanum Bukasov & Lechn.
- Solanum andigenum var. socco-huaccoto Bukasov & Lechn.
- Solanum andigenum convar. stenon Lechn.
- Solanum andigenum var. stenophyllum Bukasov & Lechn.
- Solanum andigenum f. sunchchu Bukasov & Lechn.
- Solanum andigenum subsp. tarmense Bukasov & Lechn.
- Solanum andigenum f. tenue Bukasov & Lechn.
- Solanum andigenum f. tiahuanacense Bukasov & Lechn.
- Solanum andigenum convar. titicacense Lechn.
- Solanum andigenum f. tocanum Bukasov
- Solanum andigenum f. tolucanum Bukasov
- Solanum andigenum f. uncuna Bukasov & Lechn.
- Solanum apurimacense Vargas
- Solanum aracatscha Besser
- Solanum aracc-papa Juz. ex Rybin
- Solanum ascasabii Hawkes
- Solanum boyacense Juz. & Bukasov
- Solanum caniarense Juz. & Bukasov
- Solanum cardenasii Hawkes
- Solanum cayeuxi Berthault
- Solanum chariense A.Chev.
- Solanum chaucha Juz. & Bukasov
- Solanum chaucha var. ccoe-sulla Ochoa
- Solanum chaucha var. ckati Ochoa
- Solanum chaucha var. khoyllu Ochoa
- Solanum chaucha var. puca-suitu Ochoa
- Solanum chaucha f. purpureum Hawkes
- Solanum chaucha f. roseum Hawkes
- Solanum chaucha var. surimana Ochoa
- Solanum chiloense (A.DC.) Berthault
- Solanum chilotanum Hawkes
- Solanum chilotanum var. angustifurcatum Lechn.
- Solanum chilotanum f. magnicorollatum Lechn.
- Solanum chilotanum f. parvicorollatum Lechn.
- Solanum chilotanum var. talukdarii Lechn.
- Solanum chocclo Bukasov & Lechn.
- Solanum churuspi Hawkes
- Solanum coeruleiflorum Hawkes
- Solanum cultum (A.DC.) Berthault
- Solanum diemii E.Brucher
- Solanum dubium E.H.L.Krause
- Solanum erlansonii Anon.
- Solanum esculentum Neck.
- Solanum estradea L.E.López
- Solanum goniocalyx Juz. & Bukasov
- Solanum goniocalyx var. caeruleum Vargas
- Solanum herrerae Juz.
- Solanum hygrothermicum Ochoa
- Solanum kesselbrenneri Juz. & Bukasov
- Solanum leptostigma Juz.
- Solanum leptostigma Juz. ex Bukasov
- Solanum macmillanii Bukasov
- Solanum maglia var. chubutense Bitter
- Solanum maglia var. guaytecarum Bitter
- Solanum mamilliferum Juz. & Bukasov
- Solanum molinae Juz.
- Solanum oceanicum Brücher
- Solanum ochoanum Lechn.
- Solanum paramoense Bitter ex Pittier
- Solanum parmentieri Molina ex Walp.
- Solanum parvicorollatum Lechn.
- Solanum phureja Juz. & Bukasov
- Solanum phureja var. caeruleum Ochoa
- Solanum phureja var. erlansonii (Bukasov & Lechnovitch) Ochoa
- Solanum phureja subsp. estradae (L.E.López) Hawkes
- Solanum phureja var. flavum Ochoa
- Solanum phureja subsp. hygrothermicum (Ochoa) Hawkes
- Solanum phureja var. janck'o-phureja Ochoa
- Solanum phureja var. macmillanii (Bukasov & Lechnovitch) Ochoa
- Solanum phureja f. orbiculatum Ochoa
- Solanum phureja var. pujeri Hawkes
- Solanum phureja var. rubroroseum Ochoa
- Solanum phureja var. sanguineum Ochoa
- Solanum phureja f. sayhuanimayo Ochoa
- Solanum phureja f. timusi Ochoa
- Solanum phureja f. viuda Ochoa
- Solanum riobambense Juz. & Bukasov
- Solanum rybinii Juz. & Bukasov
- Solanum rybinii var. bogotense Hawkes
- Solanum rybinii var. boyacense (Juz. & Bukasov) Hawkes
- Solanum rybinii var. pastoense Hawkes
- Solanum rybinii var. popayanum Hawkes
- Solanum sabinei (A.DC.) Berthault
- Solanum sanmartinense Brücher
- Solanum sendigena Juz. & Bukasov
- Solanum sinense Blanco
- Solanum stenotomum Juz. & Bukasov
- Solanum stenotomum f. alcay-imilla Hawkes
- Solanum stenotomum f. canasense Vargas
- Solanum stenotomum f. canastilla Hawkes
- Solanum stenotomum f. catari-papa Hawkes
- Solanum stenotomum f. ccami Bukasov Hawkes
- Solanum stenotomum var. ccami Bukasov
- Solanum stenotomum var. chapina Hawkes
- Solanum stenotomum f. chilcas Hawkes
- Solanum stenotomum f. chincherae Hawkes
- Solanum stenotomum f. chojllu Hawkes
- Solanum stenotomum f. cochicallo Hawkes
- Solanum stenotomum f. cohuasa Hawkes
- Solanum stenotomum f. cuchipacon Hawkes
- Solanum stenotomum var. cyaneum Hawkes
- Solanum stenotomum f. eucaliptae Hawkes
- Solanum stenotomum subsp. goniocalyx (Juz. & Bukasov) Hawkes
- Solanum stenotomum f. huallata-chinchi Hawkes
- Solanum stenotomum f. huamanpa-uman Hawkes
- Solanum stenotomum f. huanuchi Hawkes
- Solanum stenotomum var. huicu Hawkes
- Solanum stenotomum f. kamara Hawkes
- Solanum stenotomum f. kantillero Hawkes
- Solanum stenotomum var. keccrana Hawkes
- Solanum stenotomum f. kehuillo Hawkes
- Solanum stenotomum f. koso-nahui Hawkes
- Solanum stenotomum var. megalocalyx Hawkes
- Solanum stenotomum f. negrum Hawkes
- Solanum stenotomum f. orcco-amajaya Hawkes
- Solanum stenotomum f. pallidum Hawkes
- Solanum stenotomum var. peruanum Hawkes
- Solanum stenotomum f. phinu Hawkes
- Solanum stenotomum f. phitu-huayacas Hawkes
- Solanum stenotomum f. piticana Hawkes
- Solanum stenotomum var. pitiquilla Hawkes
- Solanum stenotomum f. pitoca Hawkes
- Solanum stenotomum var. poccoya Vargas
- Solanum stenotomum f. puca Vargas
- Solanum stenotomum var. puca-lunca Hawkes
- Solanum stenotomum var. putis Hawkes
- Solanum stenotomum f. roseum Hawkes
- Solanum stenotomum f. tiele Hawkes
- Solanum stenotomum f. yana-cculi Hawkes
- Solanum stenotomum f. yuracc Vargas
- Solanum subandigenum Hawkes
- Solanum sylvestre Audib. ex Dunal
- Solanum tarmense Bukasov
- Solanum tascalense Brücher
- Solanum tenuifilamentum Juz. & Bukasov
- Solanum tuberosum f. acuminatum Bukasov & Lechn.
- Solanum tuberosum var. aethiopicum Alef.
- Solanum tuberosum var. alaudinum Alef.
- Solanum tuberosum var. album Alef.
- Solanum tuberosum f. alkka-imilla Ochoa
- Solanum tuberosum f. alkka-silla Ochoa
- Solanum tuberosum f. amajaya Ochoa
- Solanum tuberosum subsp. andigenum (Juz. & Bukasov) Hawkes
- Solanum tuberosum var. anglicum Alef.
- Solanum tuberosum f. araucanum Bukasov & Lechn.
- Solanum tuberosum f. auriculatum Bukasov & Lechn.
- Solanum tuberosum f. azul-runa Ochoa
- Solanum tuberosum var. batatinum Alef.
- Solanum tuberosum var. bertuchii Alef.
- Solanum tuberosum var. borsdorfianum Alef.
- Solanum tuberosum var. brachyceras Alef.
- Solanum tuberosum f. brachykalukon Bukasov & Lechn.
- Solanum tuberosum f. brevipapillosum Bukasov & Lechn.
- Solanum tuberosum var. brevipilosum Bukasov & Lechn.
- Solanum tuberosum var. bufoninum Alef.
- Solanum tuberosum var. californicum Alef.
- Solanum tuberosum f. camota Bukasov & Lechn.
- Solanum tuberosum var. cepinum Alef.
- Solanum tuberosum f. chaped Bukasov & Lechn.
- Solanum tuberosum f. chiar-lelekkoya Ochoa
- Solanum tuberosum f. chiar-pala Ochoa
- Solanum tuberosum subsp. chiloense A.DC. L.I.Kostina
- Solanum tuberosum var. chiloense A.DC.
- Solanum tuberosum var. chilotanum Bukasov & Lechn.
- Solanum tuberosum f. chojo-sajama Ochoa
- Solanum tuberosum var. chubutense Bitter Hawkes
- Solanum tuberosum f. conicum Bukasov & Lechn.
- Solanum tuberosum var. conocarpum Alef.
- Solanum tuberosum f. contortum Bukasov & Lechn.
- Solanum tuberosum f. coraila Bukasov & Lechn.
- Solanum tuberosum var. cordiforme Alef.
- Solanum tuberosum var. corsicanum Alef.
- Solanum tuberosum f. crassifilamentum Bukasov & Lechn.
- Solanum tuberosum var. crassipedicellatum Bukasov & Lechn.
- Solanum tuberosum var. cucumerinum Alef.
- Solanum tuberosum var. cultum
- Solanum tuberosum var. drakeanum Alef.
- Solanum tuberosum var. elegans Bukasov & Lechn.
- Solanum tuberosum f. elongatum Bukasov & Lechn.
- Solanum tuberosum var. elongatum Alef.
- Solanum tuberosum f. enode Bukasov & Lechn.
- Solanum tuberosum var. erythroceras Alef.
- Solanum tuberosum var. fragariinum Alef.
- Solanum tuberosum var. guaytecarum Bitter Hawkes
- Solanum tuberosum var. hassicum Alef.
- Solanum tuberosum var. helenanum Alef.
- Solanum tuberosum var. hispanicum Alef.
- Solanum tuberosum var. holsaticum Alef.
- Solanum tuberosum f. huaca-zapato Ochoa
- Solanum tuberosum f. huichinkka Ochoa
- Solanum tuberosum f. indianum Lechn. ex Bukasov
- Solanum tuberosum f. infectum Bukasov & Lechn.
- Solanum tuberosum f. isla-imilla Ochoa
- Solanum tuberosum f. jancck'o-kkoyllu Ochoa
- Solanum tuberosum f. janck'o-chockella Ochoa
- Solanum tuberosum f. janck'o-pala Ochoa
- Solanum tuberosum var. julianum Alef.
- Solanum tuberosum var. kaunitzii Alef.
- Solanum tuberosum f. kunurana Ochoa
- Solanum tuberosum f. laram-lelekkoya Ochoa
- Solanum tuberosum f. latum Bukasov & Lechn.
- Solanum tuberosum var. laurentianum Alef.
- Solanum tuberosum var. lelekkoya Ochoa
- Solanum tuberosum var. leonhardianum Alef.
- Solanum tuberosum f. mahuinhue Bukasov & Lechn.
- Solanum tuberosum var. malcachu Ochoa
- Solanum tuberosum var. melanoceras Alef.
- Solanum tuberosum var. menapianum Alef.
- Solanum tuberosum var. merceri Alef.
- Solanum tuberosum f. milagro Ochoa
- Solanum tuberosum f. montticum Bukasov & Lechn.
- Solanum tuberosum var. multibaccatum Bukasov & Lechn.
- Solanum tuberosum var. murukewillu Ochoa
- Solanum tuberosum f. nigrum Ochoa
- Solanum tuberosum var. nobile Alef.
- Solanum tuberosum var. norfolcicum Alef.
- Solanum tuberosum var. nucinum Alef.
- Solanum tuberosum f. oculosum Bukasov & Lechn.
- Solanum tuberosum f. ovatum Bukasov & Lechn.
- Solanum tuberosum f. overita Ochoa
- Solanum tuberosum var. palatinatum Alef.
- Solanum tuberosum var. pecorum Alef.
- Solanum tuberosum var. peruvianum Alef.
- Solanum tuberosum f. pichuna Bukasov & Lechn.
- Solanum tuberosum f. pillicuma Bukasov & Lechn.
- Solanum tuberosum var. platyceras Alef.
- Solanum tuberosum var. polemoniifolium J.Rémy
- Solanum tuberosum var. praecox Alef.
- Solanum tuberosum var. praedicandum Alef.
- Solanum tuberosum f. pulo Ochoa
- Solanum tuberosum var. putscheanum Alef.
- Solanum tuberosum var. recurvatum Bukasov & Lechn.
- Solanum tuberosum var. reniforme Alef.
- Solanum tuberosum var. rockii Alef.
- Solanum tuberosum var. rossicum Alef.
- Solanum tuberosum var. rubrisuturatum Bukasov & Lechn.
- Solanum tuberosum var. rugiorum Alef.
- Solanum tuberosum var. runa Ochoa
- Solanum tuberosum var. sabinei A.DC.
- Solanum tuberosum var. saccharatum Alef.
- Solanum tuberosum var. salamandrinum Alef.
- Solanum tuberosum f. sani-imilla Ochoa
- Solanum tuberosum var. schnittspahnii Alef.
- Solanum tuberosum f. sebastianum Bukasov & Lechn.
- Solanum tuberosum var. sesquimensale Alef.
- Solanum tuberosum var. sicha Ochoa
- Solanum tuberosum var. sipancachi Ochoa
- Solanum tuberosum var. strobilinum Alef.
- Solanum tuberosum f. surico Ochoa
- Solanum tuberosum var. taraco Ochoa
- Solanum tuberosum var. tener Alef.
- Solanum tuberosum f. tenuipedicellatum Bukasov & Lechn.
- Solanum tuberosum f. thalassinum Bukasov & Lechn.
- Solanum tuberosum var. tinctorium Alef.
- Solanum tuberosum f. tinguipaya Ochoa
- Solanum tuberosum var. ulmense Alef.
- Solanum tuberosum var. versicolor Alef.
- Solanum tuberosum var. villaroella Bukasov & Lechn.
- Solanum tuberosum f. viride Bukasov & Lechn.
- Solanum tuberosum var. vuchefeldicum Alef.
- Solanum tuberosum var. vulgare Macloskie
- Solanum tuberosum var. vulgare Hook.f.
- Solanum tuberosum f. wila-huaycku Ochoa
- Solanum tuberosum f. wila-imilla Ochoa
- Solanum tuberosum f. wila-k'oyu Ochoa
- Solanum tuberosum f. wila-monda Ochoa
- Solanum tuberosum f. wila-pala Ochoa
- Solanum tuberosum var. xanthoceras Alef.
- Solanum tuberosum f. yurac-taraco Ochoa
- Solanum tuberosum var. yutuense Bukasov & Lechn.
- Solanum utile Klotzsch
- Solanum yabari Hawkes
- Solanum yabari var. cuzcoense Hawkes
- Solanum yabari var. pepino Hawkes
- Solanum zykinii Lechn.
