= Potato fruit =

Inedible fruit of the potato plant

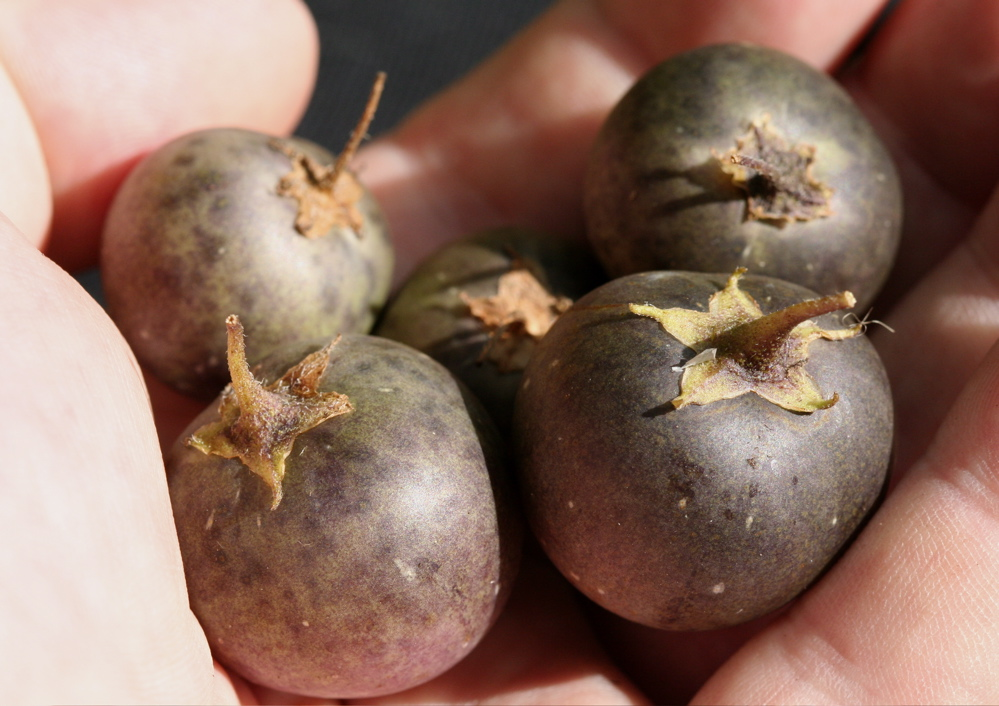
The toxic fruits produced by mature potato plants

The potato fruit, also known as a potato berry, is the part of the potato plant that, after flowering, produces a toxic, green cherry tomato-like fruit.

== Characteristics ==
After flowering, potato plants produce small green fruits that resemble green cherry tomatoes, each containing about 25-200 seeds. Like all other parts of the plant except the tubers, the fruit contains the toxic alkaloid solanine and are therefore unsuitable for consumption.

Potato fruits are produced when the plants experience cool temperatures and sufficient water. In 2014, many gardeners in Michigan, United States, were alarmed when they found the green fruit which are not normally produced on the potato plant in that region. This was due to the weather in July that year being cooler and wetter than normal, allowing the plants' flowers sufficient time to be pollinated and produce fruit.

== Seeds growing ==
Commercially sold potatoes are usually grown from potato tubers, not seeds. Most often potato seeds are used by breeders and gardeners to develop new cultivars of potato. The dormancy period of freshly harvested seeds is about one year so it takes several years for the seed to develop the same size and tubers that its parent had. The seeds from which new potato varieties are grown are often referred to as "true potato seed" (TPS) or "botanical seed" to distinguish it from seed tubers.

New varieties grown from seed can be propagated vegetatively by planting tubers, pieces of tubers cut to include at least one or two eyes, or cuttings, a practice used in greenhouses for the production of healthy seed tubers. Plants propagated from tubers are clones of the parent, whereas those propagated from seed produce a range of different varieties.

== In popular culture ==
Dorothy L. Sayers's short story "The Leopard Lady", in the 1939 collection In the Teeth of the Evidence, features a child poisoned by potato berries injected with the alkaloid solanine to increase their toxicity.
