= Axomamma =

Incan goddess of potatoes

Axomamma (also Acsumamma and Ajomamma) is a goddess of potatoes in Inca mythology. She is one of the daughters of Pachamama, the earth mother. Potatoes form a vital part of the food supply of the Incan people, and most villages had a particularly odd-shaped potato to worship and to beg for a good harvest. Potatoes were first raised by farmers in the Andes Mountains nearly 7,000 years ago. The potato grew wild high in the Andes Mountains in South America by 3,000 BCE but it wasn't until the Incan civilization (ca. 100–1530 CE) that the tuber's agricultural potential was realized. The Incan people greatly valued agricultural variety and grew thousand of different types of potatoes in a large range of shapes and colors.

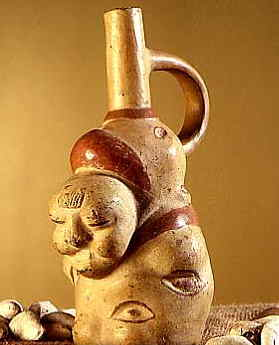
Axomamma, Incan goddess of potatoes

Incas not only grew and ate potatoes, but also worshiped them, and even took to burying potatoes with their dead. The Incas also believed that every crop had a protective spirit named Conopas. Conopas were the best proceeds of the crop that was set aside to offer it to the gods during a special ceremony. They believed that in offering it to the gods, future crops would maximize their yields.
