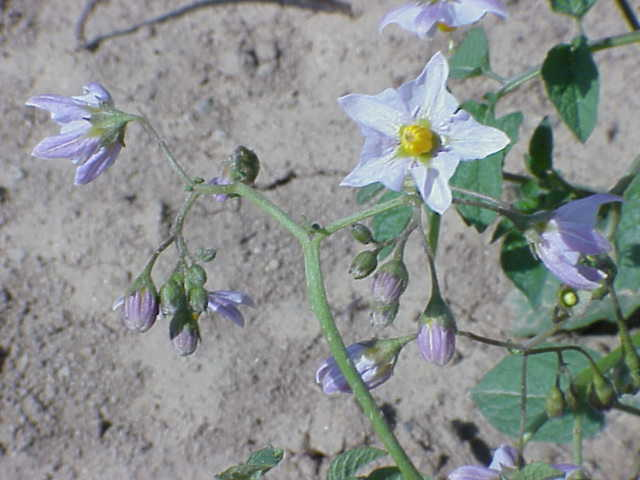

Scientific classification
- Kingdom: Plantae
- Clade: Tracheophytes
- Clade: Angiosperms
- Clade: Eudicots
- Clade: Asterids
- Order: Solanales
- Family: Solanaceae
- Genus: Solanum
- Species: S. brevicaule

Binomial name
- Solanum brevicaule Bitter

= Solanum brevicaule =

Species of flowering plant

Solanum brevicaule is a tuberous perennial plant of the family Solanaceae. The species is native to South America (Argentina, Bolivia, and Peru). It is related to the potato, but unlike the potato which is tetraploid, it has several levels of ploidy: diploid, tetraploid, and hexaploid.

This species gives its name to the "Solanum brevicaule complex" which includes about twenty species of morphologically close wild potato species distributed between central Peru and northern Argentina, and are considered by some taxonomists to be the ancestors of the traditional varieties of potatoes grown in the Andrean regions.
