= Solanum demissum =

Scientific classification
- Kingdom: Plantae
- Clade: Embryophytes
- Clade: Tracheophytes
- Clade: Angiosperms
- Clade: Eudicots
- Clade: Asterids
- Order: Solanales
- Family: Solanaceae
- Genus: Solanum
- Species: S. demissum

Binomial name
- Solanum demissum Lindl.

Synonyms
- List: Solanum alpicum Standl. & Steyerm.; Solanum demissum f. adpresso-acuminatum Bukasov ex Rybin; Solanum demissum f. atrocyaneum Lechn. ex Bukasov; Solanum demissum f. calycotrichum Hawkes; Solanum demissum var. klotzschii Bitter; Solanum demissum f. longifilamentosum Hawkes; Solanum demissum var. mastoidostigma Hawkes; Solanum demissum f. microcalyx Lechn. ex Bukasov; Solanum demissum var. orientale Hawkes; Solanum demissum f. perotanum Hawkes; Solanum demissum f. tlaxpehualcoense Bukasov ex Rybin; Solanum demissum f. tolucense Hawkes; Solanum demissum f. xitlense Bukasov ex Rybin; Solanum semidemissum Juz.; Solanum semidemissum Juz. ex Bukasov; Solanum stoloniferum var. pumilum M.Martens & Galeotti

Species of flowering plant

Solanum demissum is a species of wild potato in the family Solanaceae, native to Mexico and Guatemala. It has been extensively used as a source of alleles for resistance to Phytophthora infestans, the cause of late potato blight, to improve the domestic potato Solanum tuberosum.

== Disease ==
This species or S. stoloniferum may be used to replace cultivated potato due to their superior disease resistance.
