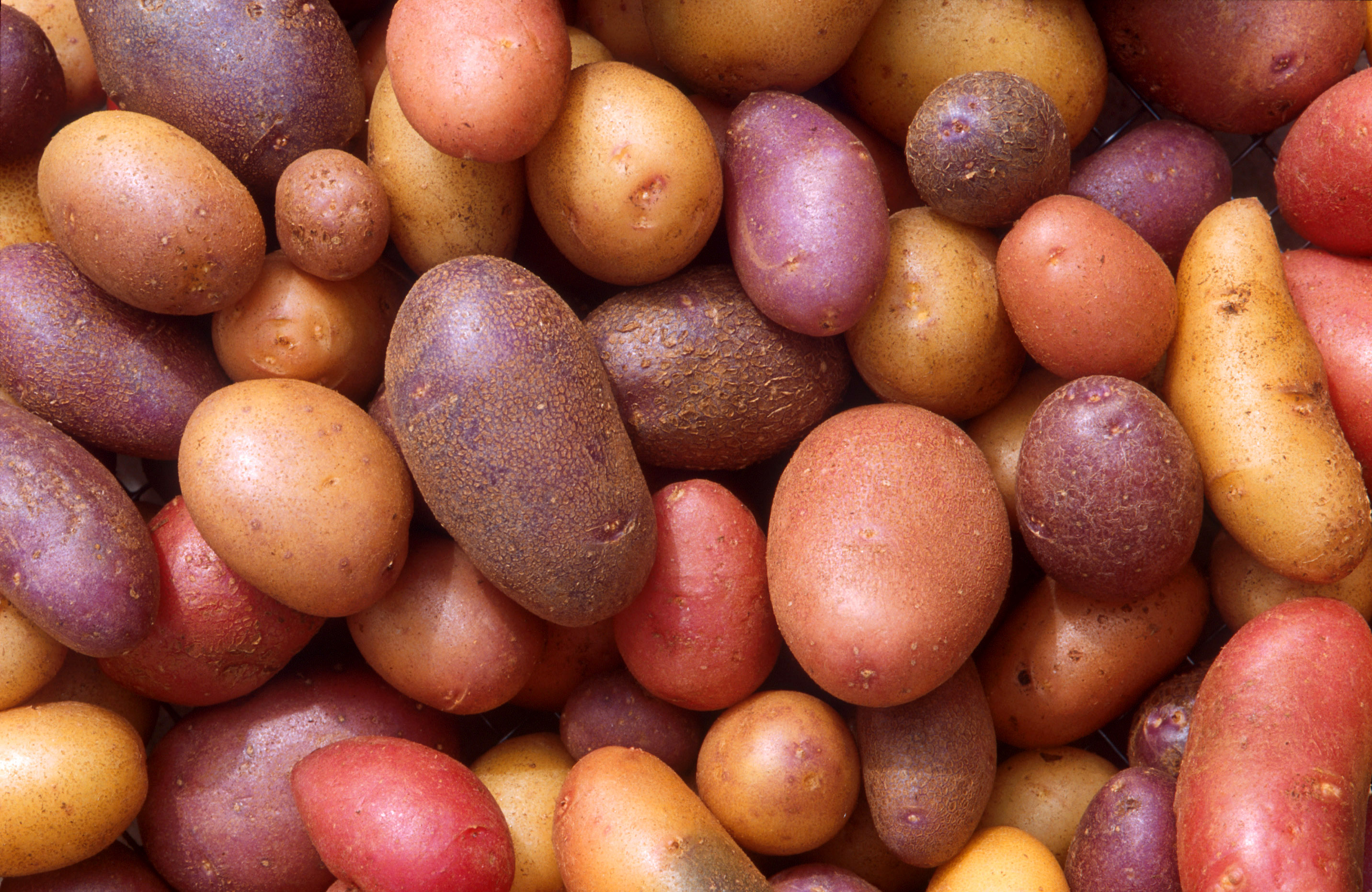
- Potato cultivars appear in a variety of colors, shapes, and sizes.

Scientific classification
- Kingdom: Plantae
- Clade: Tracheophytes
- Clade: Angiosperms
- Clade: Eudicots
- Clade: Asterids
- Order: Solanales
- Family: Solanaceae
- Genus: Solanum
- Species: S. tuberosum

Binomial name
- Solanum tuberosum L.

Synonyms
- see list

= Potato =

Starchy tuber used as a staple food

The potato (/pəˈteɪtoʊ/) is a starchy tuberous vegetable native to the Americas that is consumed as a staple food in many parts of the world. Potatoes are underground stem tubers of the plant Solanum tuberosum, a perennial in the nightshade family Solanaceae.

Wild potato species can be found from the southern United States to southern Chile. Genetic studies show that the cultivated potato has a single origin, in the area of present-day southern Peru and extreme northwestern Bolivia. Potatoes were domesticated there about 7,000–10,000 years ago from a species in the S. brevicaule complex. Many varieties of the potato are cultivated in the Andes region of South America, where the species is indigenous.

The Spanish introduced potatoes to Europe in the second half of the 16th century from the Americas. They are a staple food in many parts of the world and an integral part of much of the world's food supply. Following centuries of selective breeding, there are now over 5,000 different varieties of potatoes. The potato remains an essential crop in Europe, especially Northern and Eastern Europe, where per capita production is still the highest in the world, while the most rapid expansion in production during the 21st century was in southern and eastern Asia, with China and India leading the world production as of 2023.

Like the tomato and the nightshades, the potato is in the genus Solanum. The aerial parts of the potato contain the toxin solanine. Normal potato tubers that have been grown and stored properly produce glycoalkaloids in negligible amounts, but if sprouts and potato skins are exposed to light, tubers can become toxic.

== Etymology ==
The English word "potato" comes from Spanish patata, in turn from Taíno batata, which means "sweet potato", not the plant now known as simply "potato".

The name "spud" for a potato is from the 15th century spudde, a short and stout knife or dagger, probably related to Danish spyd, "spear". Through semantic change, the general sense of short and thick was transferred to the tuber from around 1840.

== Description ==
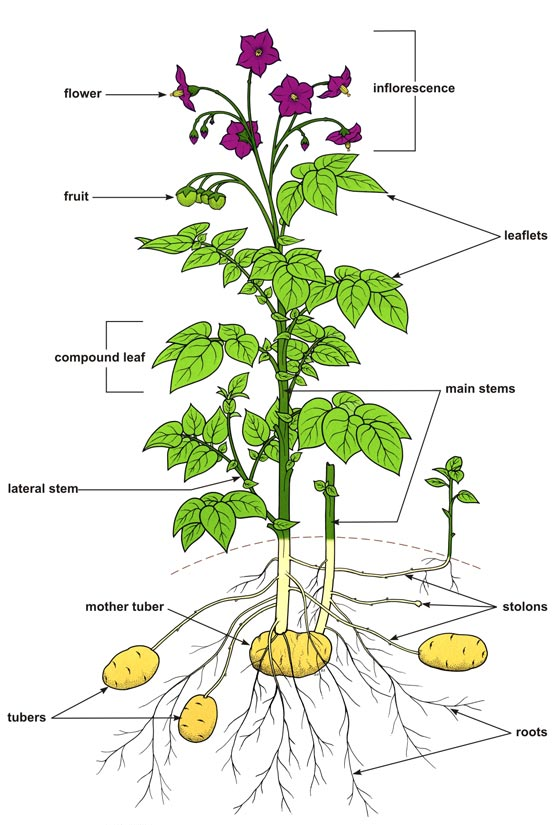
Morphology of the potato plant; tubers are forming from stolons.

Potato plants are herbaceous perennials that grow up to one metre (three feet) high. The stems are hairy. The leaves have roughly four pairs of leaflets. The flowers range from white or pink to blue or purple; they are yellow at the centre, and are insect-pollinated.

The plant develops tubers to store nutrients. These are not roots but stems that form from thickened rhizomes at the tips of long thin stolons. On the surface of the tubers there are "eyes," which act as sinks to protect the vegetative buds from which the stems originate. The "eyes" are arranged in helical form. In addition, the tubers have small holes that allow breathing, called lenticels. The lenticels are circular and their number varies depending on the size of the tuber and environmental conditions. Tubers form in response to decreasing day length, although this tendency has been minimized in commercial varieties.

After flowering, potato plants produce small green fruits that resemble green cherry tomatoes, each containing about 300 very small seeds.

== Phylogeny ==
Like the tomato, potatoes belong to the genus Solanum, which is a member of the nightshade family, the Solanaceae. That is a diverse family of flowering plants, often poisonous, that includes the mandrake (Mandragora), deadly nightshade (Atropa), and tobacco (Nicotiana), as shown in the outline phylogenetic tree (many branches omitted). The most commonly cultivated potato is S. tuberosum; there are several other species.

- Solanaceae
  - many garden flowers and other species
  - - Nicotiana (tobacco)
    - - Atropa (nightshades)
      - - Mandragora (mandrake)
        - - Capsicum
            (sweet and bell peppers)
          - Solanum
            - S. lycopersicum (tomato)
            - S. tuberosum (cultivated potato)

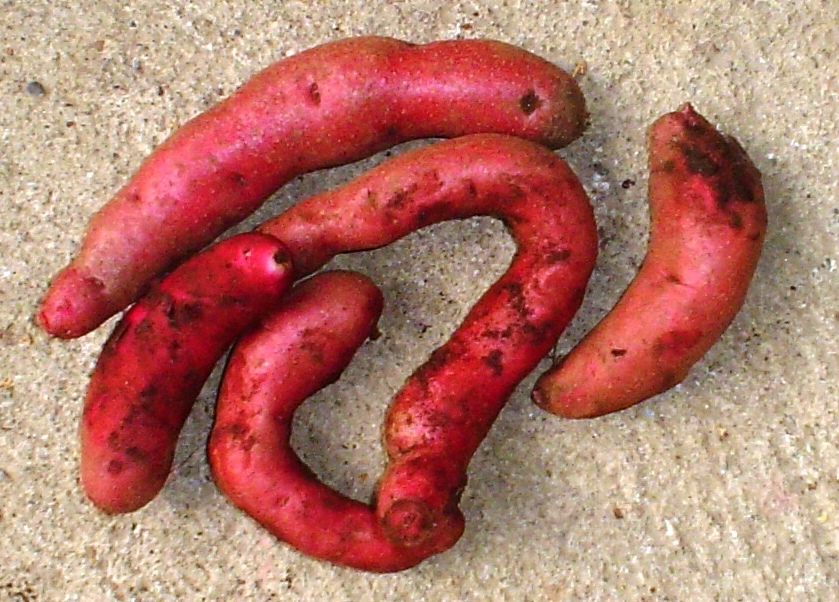
A variety of S. tuberosum tuberosum, the Chilean potato

The major species grown worldwide is S. tuberosum (a tetraploid with 48 chromosomes), and modern varieties of this species are the most widely cultivated. There are also four diploid species (with 24 chromosomes): S. stenotomum, S. phureja, S. goniocalyx, and S. ajanhuiri. There are two triploid species (with 36 chromosomes): S. chaucha and S. juzepczukii. There is one pentaploid cultivated species (with 60 chromosomes): S. curtilobum.

There are two major subspecies of tetraploid S. tuberosum. The Andean potato, S. tuberosum andigena, is adapted to the short-day conditions prevalent in the mountainous equatorial and tropical regions where it originated. The Chilean potato S. tuberosum tuberosum, native to the Chiloé Archipelago, is in contrast adapted to the long-day conditions prevalent in the higher latitude region of southern Chile.

A 2025 study by Zhang et al. examining Solanum genomes groups all species of potato under S. tuberosum. According to the study, the Petota (potato) lineage contains more than 55 diploid species, with only one being selected by humans for domestication; the study posits that all landraces branch out from a single point within Solanum candolleanum.

== History ==
=== Domestication ===
Wild potato species occur from the southern United States to southern Chile. The potato was first domesticated in southern Peru and northwestern Bolivia by pre-Columbian farmers, around Lake Titicaca. Potatoes were domesticated there about 7,000–10,000 years ago from a species in the S. brevicaule complex.

The earliest archaeologically verified potato tuber remains have been found at the coastal site of Ancon (central Peru), dating to 2500 BC. The most widely cultivated variety, Solanum tuberosum tuberosum, is indigenous to the Chiloé Archipelago, and has been cultivated by the local indigenous people since before the Spanish conquest.

=== Spread ===
Following the Spanish conquest of the Inca Empire, the Spanish introduced the potato to Europe in the second half of the 16th century as part of the Columbian exchange. The staple was subsequently conveyed by European mariners (possibly including the Russian-American Company) to territories and ports throughout the world, especially their colonies. European and colonial farmers were slow to adopt farming potatoes. After 1750, they became an important food staple and field crop and played a major role in the European 19th century population boom. According to conservative estimates, the introduction of the potato was responsible for a quarter of the growth in Old World population and urbanization between 1700 and 1900. Lack of genetic diversity, due to the very limited number of varieties initially introduced, left the crop vulnerable to disease. In 1845, a plant disease known as late blight, caused by the fungus-like oomycete Phytophthora infestans, spread rapidly through the poorer communities of western Ireland as well as parts of the Scottish Highlands, resulting in the crop failures that led to the Great Irish Famine.

The International Potato Center, based in Lima, Peru, holds 4,870 types of potato germplasm, most of which are traditional landrace cultivars. In 2009, a draft sequence of the potato genome was made, containing 12 chromosomes and 860 million base pairs, making it a medium-sized plant genome.

It had been thought that most potato cultivars derived from a single origin in southern Peru and extreme Northwestern Bolivia, from a species in the S. brevicaule complex. DNA analysis however shows that more than 99% of all current varieties of potatoes are direct descendants of a subspecies that once grew in the lowlands of south-central Chile.

Most modern potatoes grown in North America arrived through European settlement and not independently from the South American sources. At least one wild potato species, Solanum fendleri, occurs in North America; it is used in breeding for resistance to a nematode species that attacks cultivated potatoes. A secondary center of genetic variability of the potato is Mexico, where important wild species used extensively in modern breeding are found, such as the hexaploid S. demissum, used as a source of resistance to the devastating late blight disease (Phytophthora infestans). Another relative native to this region, Solanum bulbocastanum, has been used to genetically engineer the potato to resist potato blight. Many such wild relatives are useful for breeding resistance to P. infestans.

Little of the diversity found in Solanum ancestral and wild relatives is found outside the original South American range. This makes these South American species highly valuable in breeding. The importance of the potato to humanity is recognised in the United Nations International Day of Potato, to be celebrated on 30 May each year, starting in 2024.

== Breeding ==
Potatoes, both S. tuberosum and most of its wild relatives, are self-incompatible: they bear no useful fruit when self-pollinated. This trait is problematic for crop breeding, as all sexually produced plants must be hybrids. The gene responsible for self-incompatibility, as well as mutations to disable it, are now known. Self-compatibility has successfully been introduced both to diploid potatoes (including a special line of S. tuberosum) by CRISPR-Cas9. Plants having a 'Sli' gene produce pollen which is compatible to its own parent and plants with similar S genes. This gene was cloned by Wageningen University and Solynta in 2021, which would allow for faster and more focused breeding.

Diploid hybrid potato breeding is a recent area of potato genetics supported by the finding that simultaneous homozygosity and fixation of donor alleles is possible. Wild potato species useful for breeding blight resistance include Solanum desmissum and S. stoloniferum, among others.

=== Varieties ===
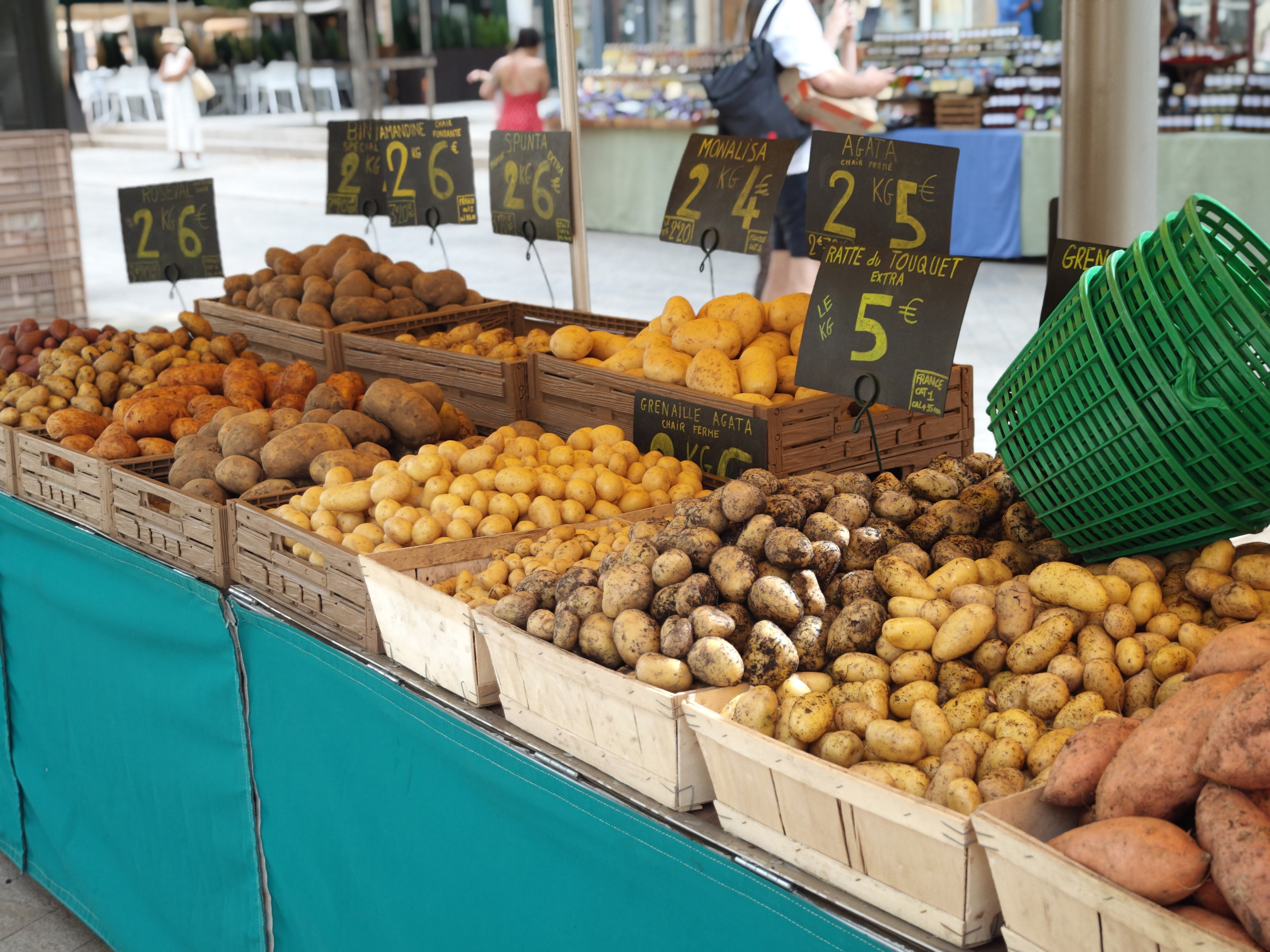
Multiple potato varieties for sale in a market in France

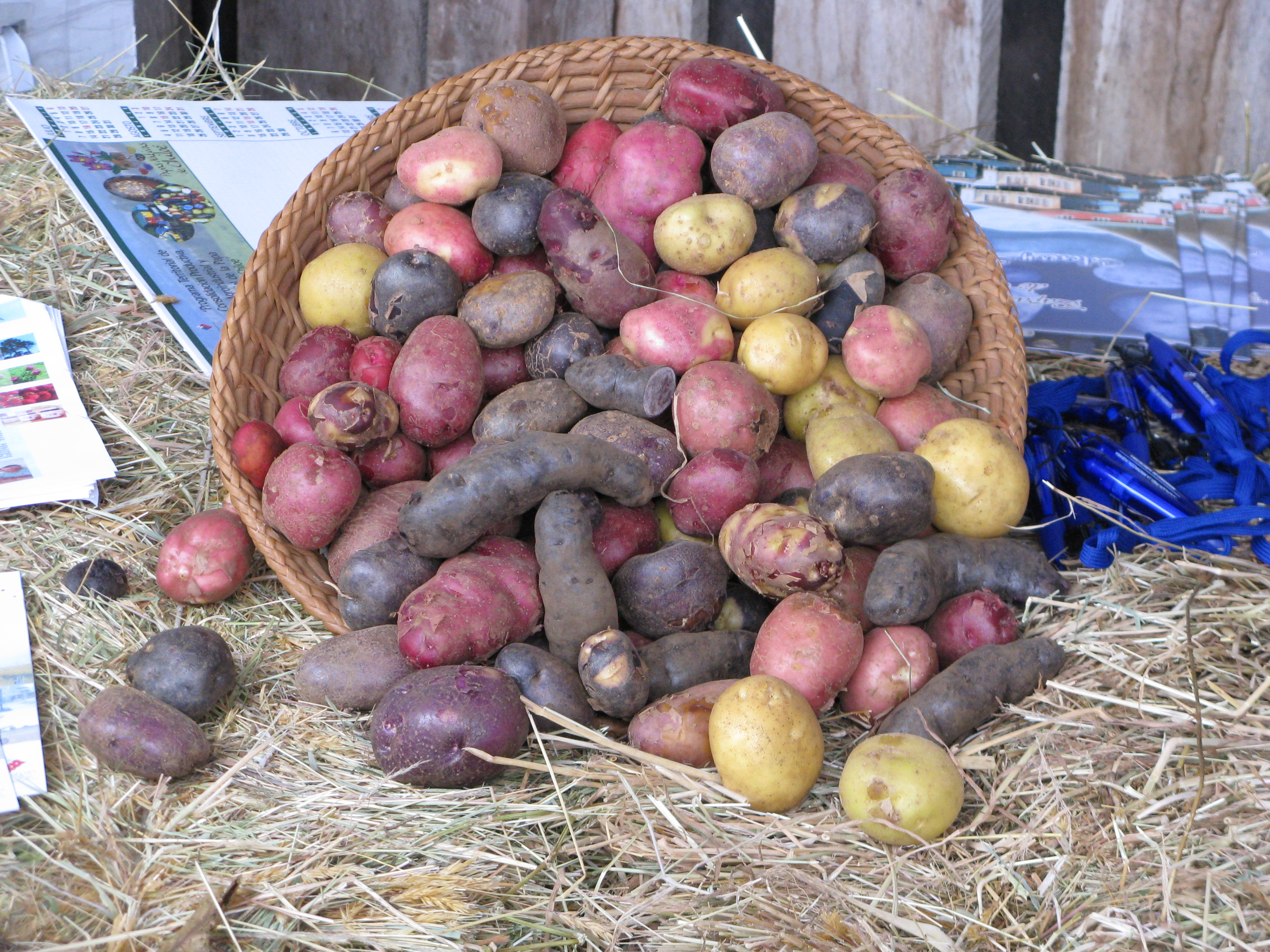
Potato varieties are diverse in shape, color, and other attributes.

There are some 5,000 potato varieties worldwide, 3,000 of them in the Andes alone — mainly in Peru, Bolivia, Ecuador, Chile, and Colombia. Over 100 cultivars might be found in a single valley, and a dozen or more might be maintained by a single agricultural household. The European Cultivated Potato Database is an online collaborative database of potato variety descriptions updated and maintained by the Scottish Agricultural Science Agency within the framework of the European Cooperative Programme for Crop Genetic Resources Networks—which is run by the International Plant Genetic Resources Institute. Around 80 varieties are commercially available in the UK.

For culinary purposes, varieties are often differentiated by their waxiness: floury or mealy baking potatoes have more starch (20–22%) than waxy boiling potatoes (16–18%). The distinction may also arise from variation in the comparative ratio of two different potato starch compounds: amylose and amylopectin. Amylose, a long-chain molecule, diffuses from the starch granule when cooked in water, and lends itself to dishes where the potato is mashed. Varieties that contain a slightly higher amylopectin content, which is a highly branched molecule, help the potato retain its shape after being boiled in water. Potatoes that are good for making potato chips or potato crisps are sometimes called "chipping potatoes", which means they meet the basic requirements of similar varietal characteristics, being firm, fairly clean, and fairly well-shaped.

Immature potatoes may be sold fresh from the field as "creamer", "new", or "baby" potatoes and are particularly valued for their taste. They are typically small in size and tender, with a loose skin, and flesh containing a lower level of starch than other potatoes. In the United States they are generally either a Yukon Gold potato or a red potato, called gold creamers or red creamers respectively. In the UK, the Jersey Royal is a famous type of new potato.

Dozens of potato cultivars have been selectively bred specifically for their skin or flesh color, including gold, red, and blue varieties. These contain varying amounts of phytochemicals, including carotenoids for gold/yellow or polyphenols for red or blue cultivars. Carotenoid compounds include provitamin A alpha-carotene and beta-carotene, which are converted to the essential nutrient, vitamin A, during digestion. Anthocyanins mainly responsible for red or blue pigmentation in potato cultivars do not have nutritional significance, but are used for visual variety and consumer appeal. In 2010, potatoes were bioengineered specifically for these pigmentation traits.

=== Genetic engineering ===
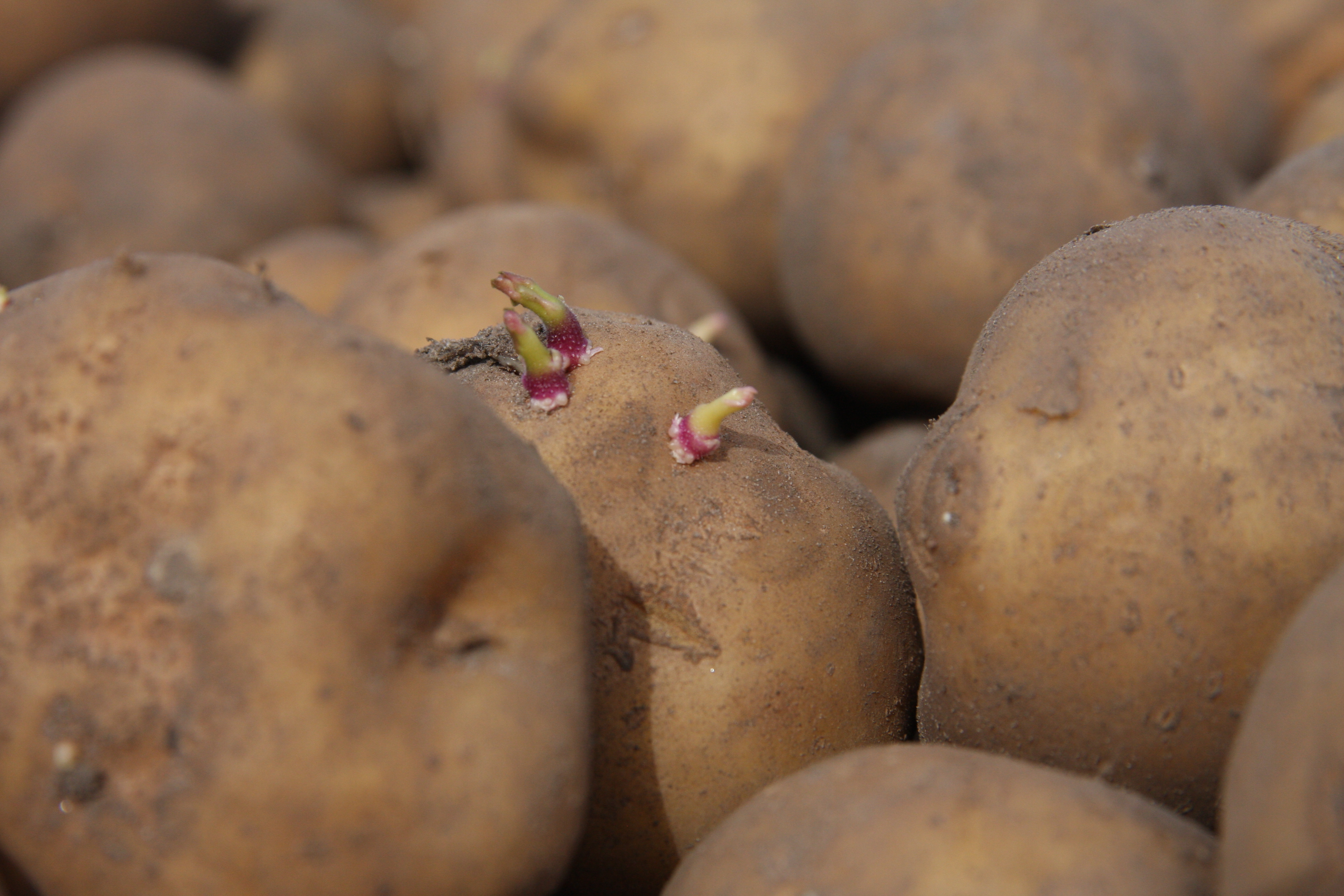
Amflora potatoes, modified to produce pure amylopectin starch

Genetic research has produced several genetically modified varieties. 'New Leaf', owned by Monsanto Company, incorporates genes from Bacillus thuringiensis (source of most Bt toxins in transcrop use), which confers resistance to the Colorado potato beetle; 'New Leaf Plus' and 'New Leaf Y', approved by US regulatory agencies during the 1990s, also include resistance to viruses. McDonald's, Burger King, Frito-Lay, and Procter & Gamble announced they would not use genetically modified potatoes, and Monsanto published its intent to discontinue the line in March 2001.

Potato starch contains two types of glucan, amylose and amylopectin, the latter of which is most industrially useful. Waxy potato varieties produce waxy potato starch, which is almost entirely amylopectin, with little or no amylose. BASF developed the 'Amflora' potato, which was modified to express antisense RNA to inactivate the gene for granule bound starch synthase, an enzyme which catalyzes the formation of amylose. 'Amflora' potatoes therefore produce starch consisting almost entirely of amylopectin, and are thus more useful for the starch industry. In 2010, the European Commission cleared the way for 'Amflora' to be grown in the European Union for industrial purposes only—not for food. Nevertheless, under EU rules, individual countries have the right to decide whether they will allow this potato to be grown on their territory. Commercial planting of 'Amflora' was expected in the Czech Republic and Germany in the spring of 2010, but due to lack of acceptance BASF in 2012 stopped selling the variety in Europe.

The 'Fortuna' GM potato variety developed by BASF was made resistant to late blight by introgressing two resistance genes, blb1 and blb2, from S. bulbocastanum, a wild potato native to Mexico. Rpi-blb1 is a nucleotide-binding leucine-rich repeat (NB-LRR/NLR), an R-gene-produced immunoreceptor.

In October 2011, BASF requested cultivation and marketing approval as a feed and food from the EFSA. In 2012, GMO development in Europe was stopped by BASF. In November 2014, the United States Department of Agriculture (USDA) approved a genetically modified potato developed by Simplot, which contains genetic modifications that prevent bruising and produce less acrylamide when fried than conventional potatoes; the modifications do not cause new proteins to be made, but rather prevent proteins from being made via RNA interference.

Genetically modified varieties have met public resistance in the U.S. and in the European Union.

== Cultivation ==
=== Seed potatoes ===
Potatoes are generally grown from "seed potatoes"; that is to say, tubers specifically grown to be free from disease and to provide consistent and healthy plants. To be disease free, the areas where seed potatoes are grown are selected with care. In the US, this restricts production of seed potatoes to only 15 states out of all 50 states where potatoes are grown. These locations are selected for their cold, hard winters that kill pests and summers with long sunshine hours for optimum growth. In the UK, most seed potatoes originate in Scotland, in areas where westerly winds reduce aphid attacks and the spread of potato virus pathogens.

=== Phases of growth ===
Potato growth can be divided into five phases. During the first phase, sprouts emerge from the seed potatoes and root growth begins. During the second, photosynthesis begins as the plant develops leaves and branches above-ground and stolons develop from lower leaf axils on the below-ground stem. In the third phase the tips of the stolons swell, forming new tubers, and the shoots continue to grow, with flowers typically developing soon after. Tuber bulking occurs during the fourth phase, when the plant begins investing the majority of its resources in its newly formed tubers. At this phase, several factors are critical to a good yield: optimal soil moisture and temperature, soil nutrient availability and balance, and resistance to pest attacks. The fifth phase is the maturation of the tubers: the leaves and stems senesce and the tuber skins harden.

New tubers may start growing at the surface of the soil. Since exposure to light leads to an undesirable greening of the skins and the development of solanine as a protection from the sun's rays, growers cover surface tubers. Commercial growers cover them by piling additional soil around the base of the plant as it grows (called "hilling" up, or in British English "earthing up"). An alternative method, used by home gardeners and smaller-scale growers, involves covering the growing area with mulches such as straw or plastic sheets.

At farm scale, potatoes require a well-drained neutral or mildly acidic soil (pH 6 or 7) such as a sandy loam. The soil is prepared using deep tillage, for example with a chisel plow or ripper. In areas where irrigation is needed, the field is leveled using a landplane so that water can be supplied evenly. Manure can be added after initial irrigation; the soil is then broken up with a disc harrow. The potatoes are planted using a potato planter machine in rows 80 centimetres (31 in) apart. At garden scale, potatoes are planted in trenches or individual holes some 15 centimetres (5.9 in) deep in soil, preferably with additional organic matter such as garden compost or manure. Alternatively, they can be planted in containers or bags filled with a free-draining compost. Potatoes are sensitive to heavy frosts, which damage them in the ground or when stored.

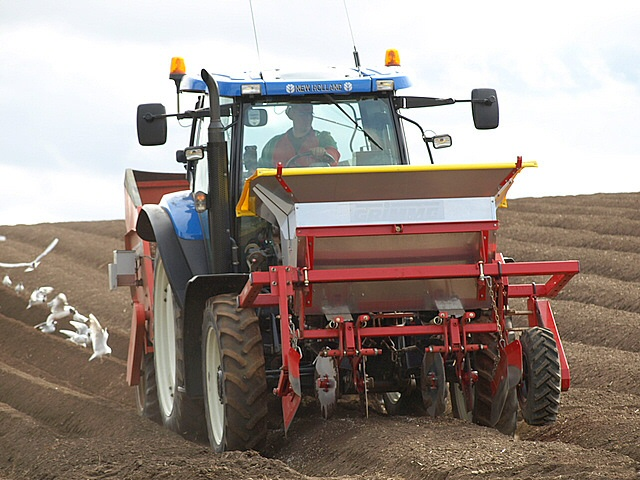
Planting

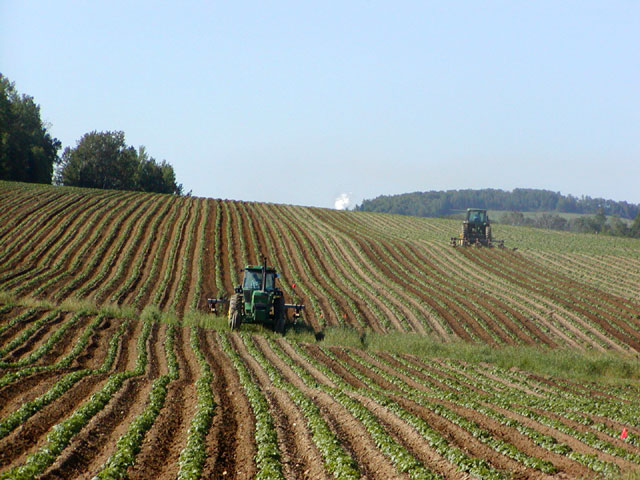
Field in Fort Fairfield, Maine

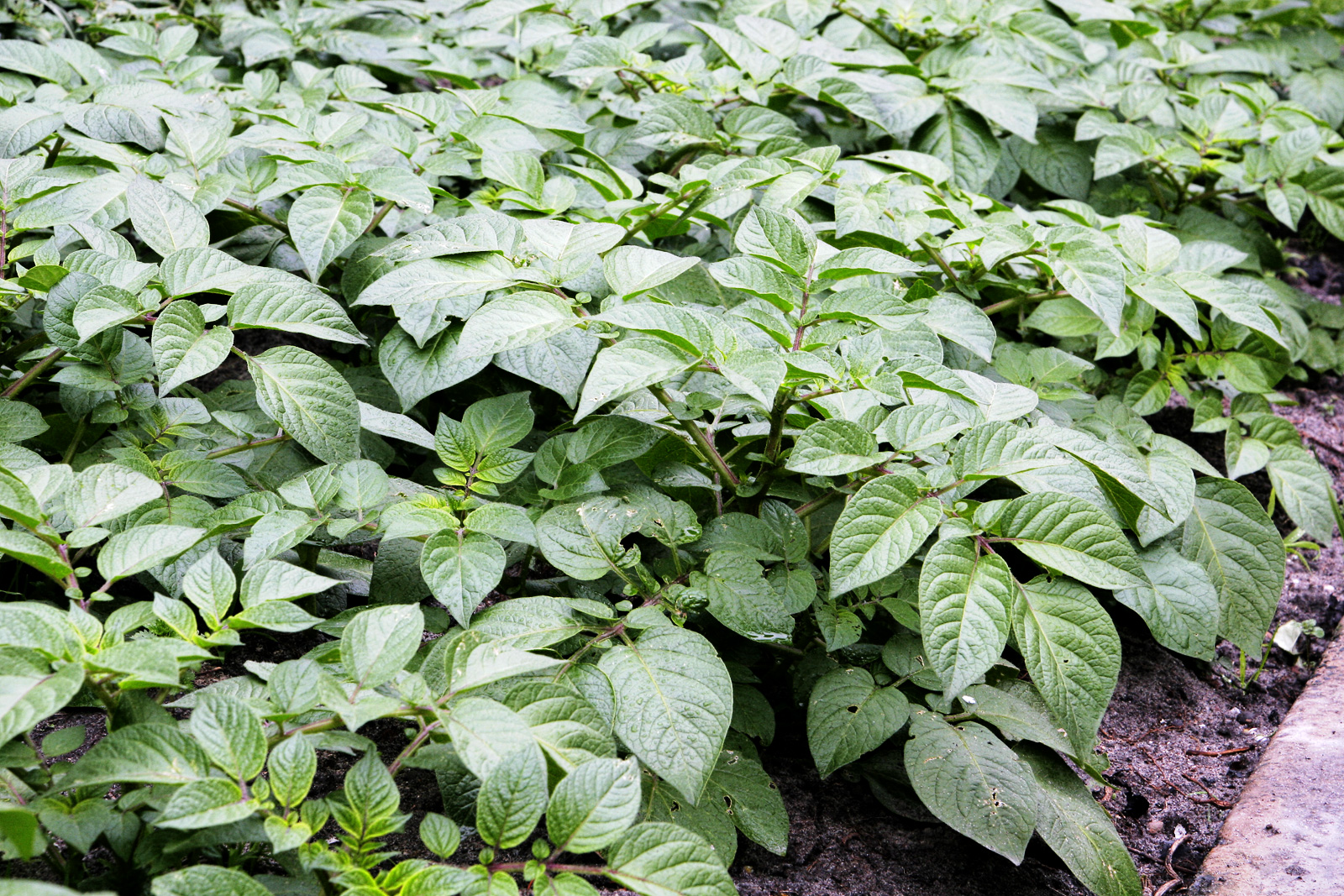
Immature potato plants

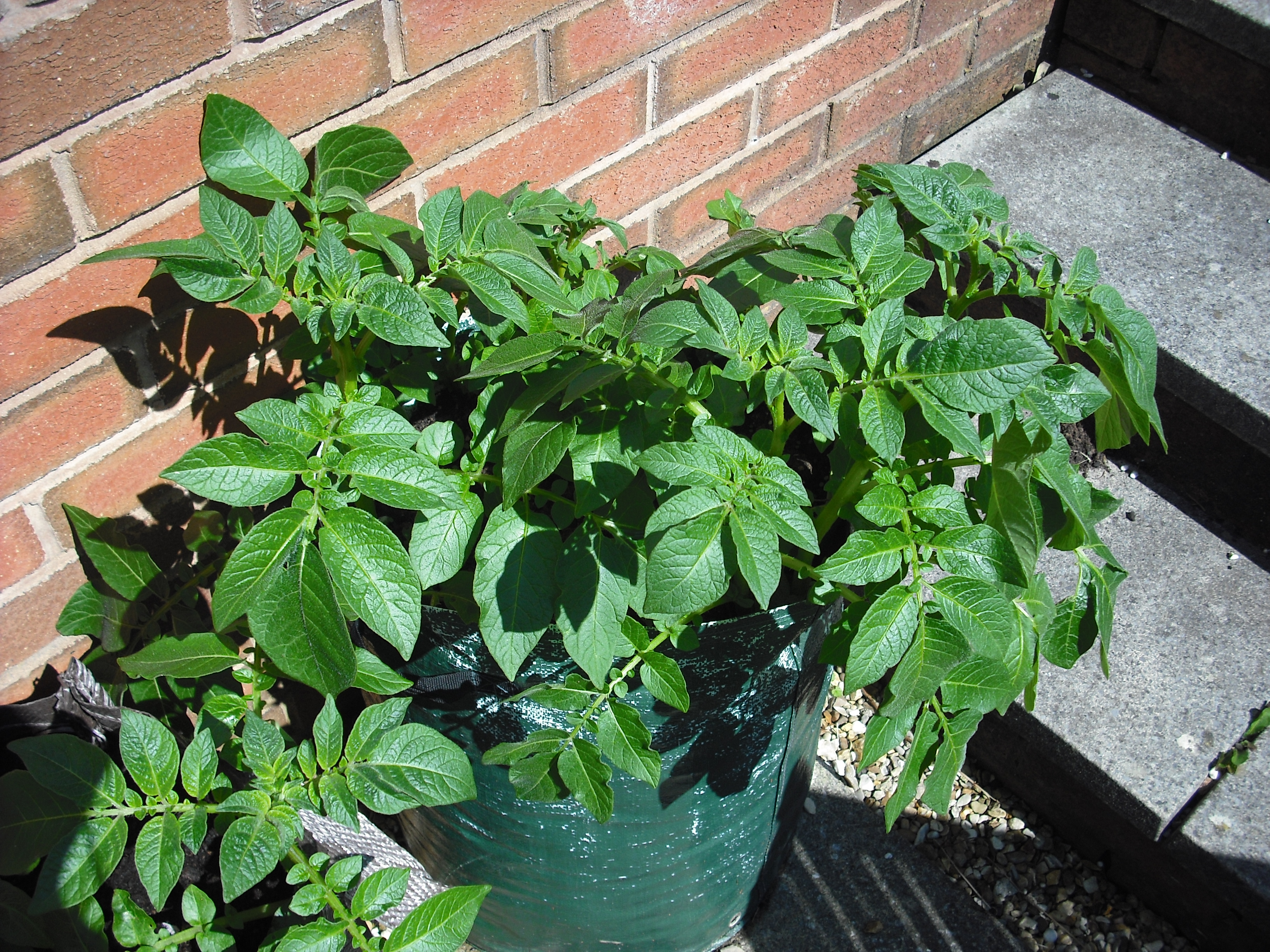
Potatoes grown in a tall bag are common in gardens as they minimize digging.

=== Pests and diseases ===
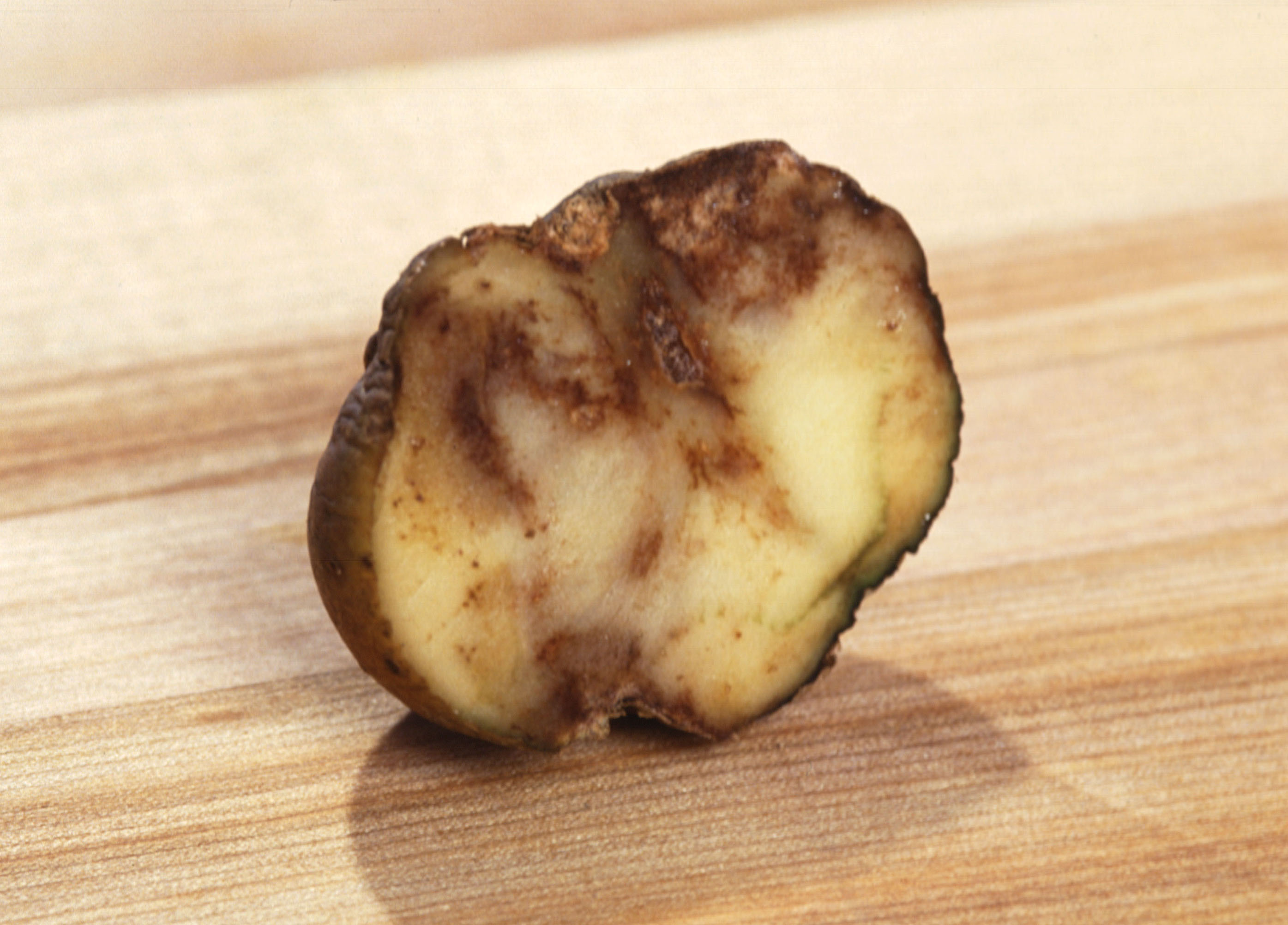
A potato with late blight caused by Phytophthora infestans

The historically significant Phytophthora infestans, the cause of late blight, remains an ongoing problem in Europe and the United States. Other potato diseases include Rhizoctonia, Sclerotinia, Pectobacterium carotovorum (black leg), powdery mildew, powdery scab and leafroll virus.

Insects that commonly transmit potato diseases or damage the plants include the Colorado potato beetle, the potato tuber moth, the green peach aphid (Myzus persicae), the potato aphid, Tuta absoluta, beet leafhoppers, thrips, and mites. The Colorado potato beetle is considered the most important insect defoliator of potatoes, devastating entire crops. The potato cyst nematode is a microscopic worm that feeds on the roots, thus causing the potato plants to wilt. Since its eggs can survive in the soil for several years, crop rotation is recommended.

=== Harvest ===
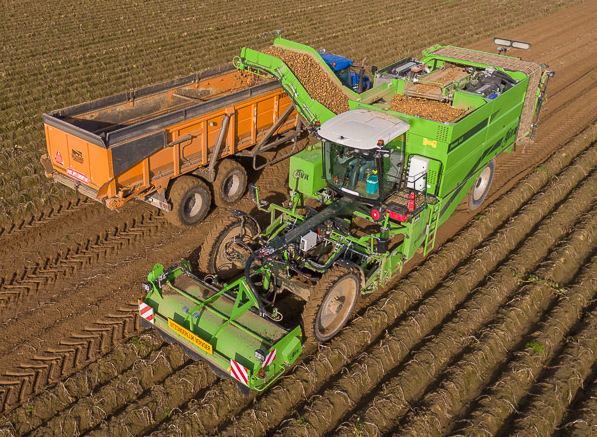
A modern potato harvester

On a small scale, potatoes can be harvested using a hoe or spade, or simply by hand. Commercial harvesting is done with large potato harvesters, which scoop up the plant and surrounding earth. This is transported up an apron chain consisting of steel links several feet wide, which separates some of the earth. The chain deposits into an area where further separation occurs. The most complex designs use vine choppers and shakers, along with a blower system to separate the potatoes from the plant. The result is then usually run past workers who continue to sort out plant material, stones, and rotten potatoes before the potatoes are continuously delivered to a wagon or truck. Further inspection and separation occurs when the potatoes are unloaded from the field vehicles and put into storage.

Potatoes are usually cured after harvest to improve skin-set. Skin-set is the process by which the skin of the potato becomes resistant to skinning damage. Potato tubers may be susceptible to skinning at harvest and suffer skinning damage during harvest and handling operations. Curing allows the skin to fully set and any wounds to heal. Wound-healing prevents infection and water-loss from the tubers during storage. Curing is normally done at relatively warm temperatures (10 to 16 °C or 50 to 60 °F) with high humidity and good gas-exchange if at all possible.

=== Storage ===
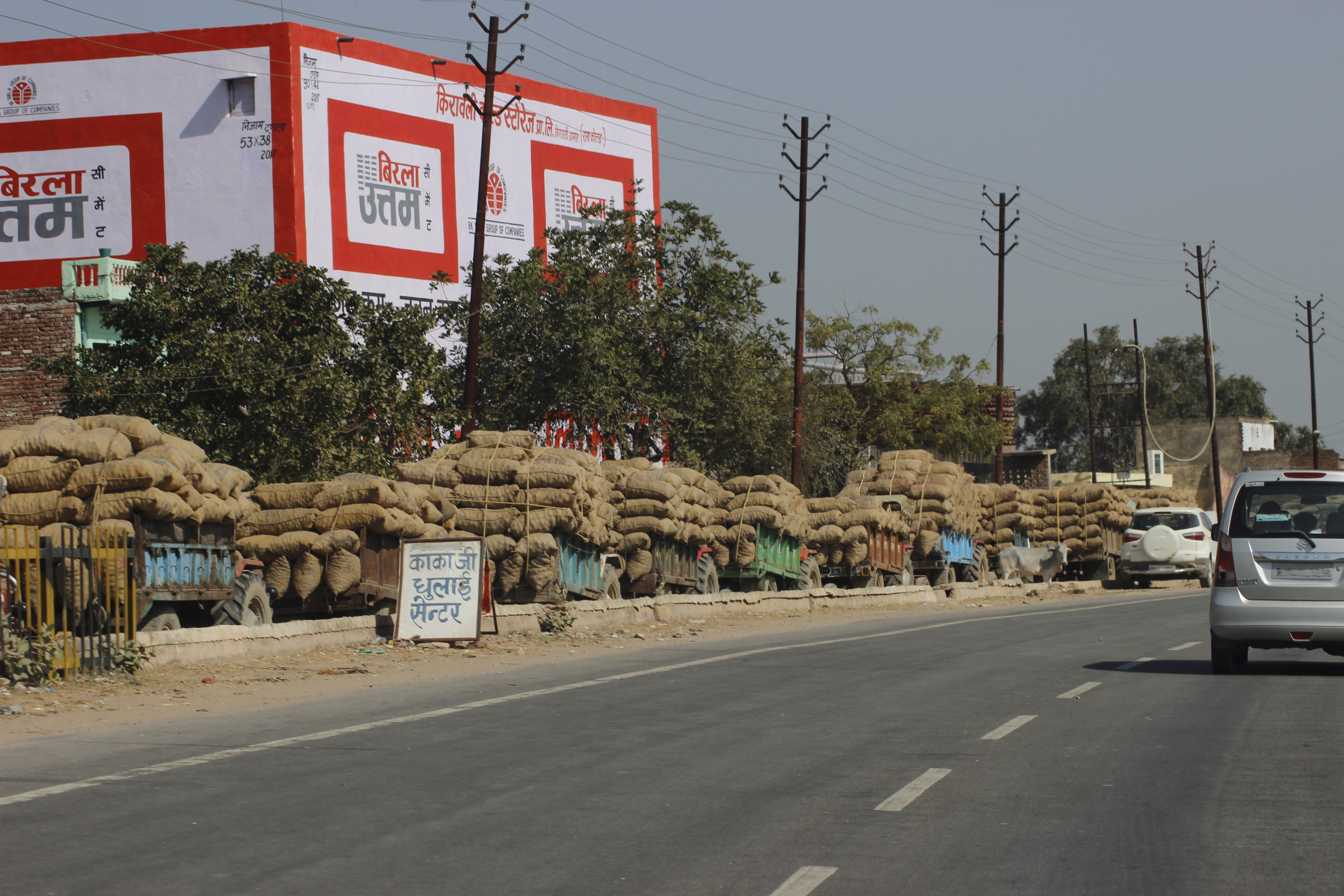
Transporting to cold storage in India

Storage facilities need to be carefully designed to keep the potatoes alive and slow the natural process of sprouting which involves the breakdown of starch. It is crucial that the storage area be dark, ventilated well, and, for long-term storage, maintained at temperatures near 4 °C (39 °F). For short-term storage, temperatures of about 7 to 10 °C (45 to 50 °F) are preferred.

Temperatures below 4 °C (39 °F) convert the starch in potatoes into sugar, which alters their taste and cooking qualities and leads to higher acrylamide levels in the cooked product, especially in deep-fried dishes. The discovery of acrylamides in starchy foods in 2002 has caused concern, but it is not likely that the acrylamides in food, even if it is somewhat burnt, causes cancer in humans.

Chemicals are used to suppress sprouting of tubers during storage. Chlorpropham is the main chemical used, but it has been banned in the EU over toxicity concerns. Alternatives include ethylene, spearmint and orange oils, and 1,4-dimethylnaphthalene.

Under optimum conditions in commercial warehouses, potatoes can be stored for up to 10–12 months. The commercial storage and retrieval of potatoes involves several phases: first drying surface moisture; wound healing at 85% to 95% relative humidity and temperatures below 25 °C (77 °F); a staged cooling phase; a holding phase; and a reconditioning phase, during which the tubers are slowly warmed. Mechanical ventilation is used at various points during the process to prevent condensation and the accumulation of carbon dioxide.

== Production ==
Potato production 2024, millions of tonnes
China	94.8
India	57.1
Ukraine	21.1
United States	19.1
Russia	18.4
World	390
Source: FAOSTAT of the United Nations

In 2024, world production of potatoes was 390 million tonnes, led by China with 24% of the total, and India as a major secondary producer (table). The total area of potatoes harvested in the world in 2024 was 17.1 million hectares (42 million acres).

Potato production

Potato yields

Yearly per capita supply of potatoes

== Effects of climate change on production ==
Climate change is predicted to have significant effects on global potato production. Like many crops, potatoes are likely to be affected by changes in atmospheric carbon dioxide, temperature and precipitation, as well as interactions between these factors. As well as affecting potatoes directly, climate change will also affect the distributions and populations of many potato diseases and pests. While the potato is less important than maize, rice, wheat and soybeans, which are collectively responsible for around two-thirds of all calories consumed by humans (both directly and indirectly as animal feed), it still is one of the world's most important food crops. Altogether, one 2003 estimate suggests that future (2040–2069) worldwide potato yield would be 18–32% lower than it was at the time, driven by declines in hotter areas like Sub-Saharan Africa, unless farmers and potato cultivars can adapt to the new environment.

Potato plants and crop yields are predicted to benefit from the CO_{2} fertilization effect, which would increase photosynthetic rates and therefore growth, reduce water consumption through lower transpiration from stomata and increase starch content in the edible tubers. However, potatoes are more sensitive to soil water deficits than some other staple crops like wheat. In the UK, the amount of arable land suitable for rainfed potato production is predicted to decrease by at least 75%. These changes are likely to lead to increased demand for irrigation water, particularly during the potato growing season.

Potatoes grow best under temperate conditions. Temperatures above 30 °C (86 °F) have negative effects on potato crops, from physiological damage such as brown spots on tubers, to slower growth, premature sprouting, and lower starch content. These effects reduce crop yield, affecting both the number and the weight of tubers. As a result, areas where current temperatures are near the limits of potatoes' temperature range (e.g. much of sub-Saharan Africa) will likely suffer large reductions in potato crop yields in the future. On the other hand, low temperatures reduce potato growth and present risk of frost damage.

=== Predicted effects on pests and diseases ===
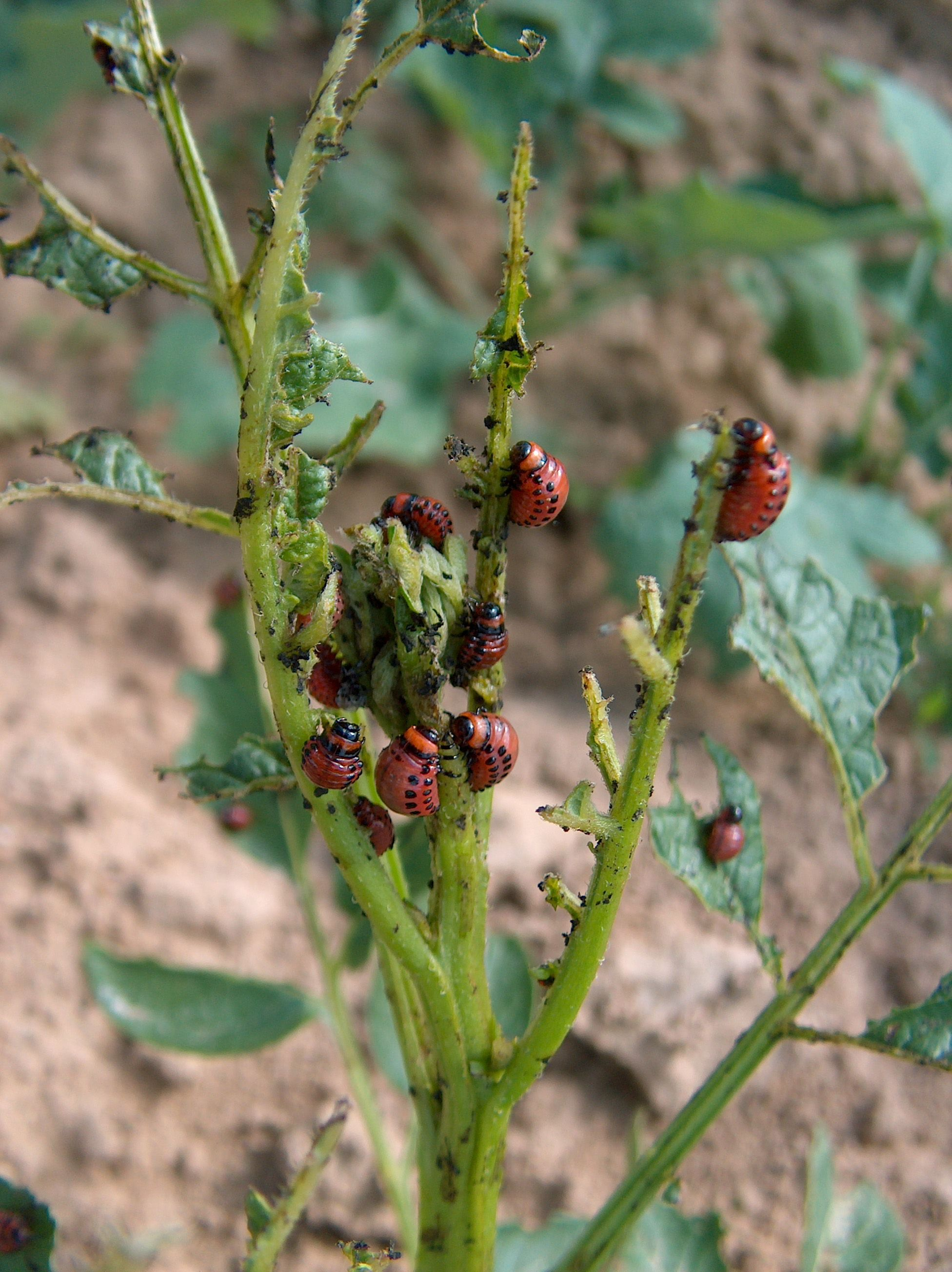
Plant destroyed by Colorado potato beetle (Leptinotarsa decemlineata) larvae

Climate change is predicted to affect many potato pests and diseases. These include:

- Spreading of insect pests such as the potato tuber moth and Colorado potato beetle into areas previously too cold for them.
- Spread of aphids, vectors for many potato viruses, as temperatures increase, allowing those viruses to spread.
- Faster reproduction and growth of pathogens causing potato blackleg disease (e.g. Dickeya) at higher temperatures.
- Increased bacterial infections such as Ralstonia solanacearum with higher temperatures, spread more easily through flash flooding.
- Increased late blight because of higher temperatures and wetter conditions. Late blight is predicted to become a greater threat in some areas (e.g. in Finland) and become a lesser threat in others (e.g. in the United Kingdom).

=== Adaptation strategies ===
Potato production is expected to decline in many areas due to hotter temperatures and decreased water availability. Conversely, production is predicted to become possible in high altitude and latitude areas where it has been limited by frost damage, such as in Canada and Russia. This will shift potato production to cooler areas, mitigating much of the projected decline in yield. However, this may trigger competition for land between potato crops and other land uses, mostly due to changes in water and temperature regimes.

The other approach is through the development of varieties or cultivars which would be more adapted to altered conditions. This can be done through 'traditional' plant breeding techniques and genetic modification. These techniques allow for the selection of specific traits as a new cultivar is developed. Certain traits, such as heat stress tolerance, drought tolerance, fast growth/early maturation and disease resistance, may play an important role in creating new cultivars able to maintain yields under stressors induced by climate change.

For instance, developing cultivars with greater heat stress tolerance would be critical for maintaining yields in countries with potato production areas near current cultivars' maximum temperature limits (e.g. Sub-Saharan Africa, India). Superior drought resistance can be achieved through improved water use efficiency (amount of food produced per amount of water used) or the ability to recover from short drought periods and still produce acceptable yields. Further, selecting for deeper root systems may reduce the need for irrigation.

== Nutrition ==
Potatoes, boiled, cooked in skin, flesh, without salt
Nutritional value per 100 g (3.5 oz)
- Energy: 364 kJ (87 kcal)
- Carbohydrates: 20.1 g
- Sugars: 0.9 g
- Dietary fiber: 1.8 g
- Fat: 0.1 g
- Protein: 1.9 g
Vitamins and minerals
Vitamins	Quantity %DV^{†}
Thiamine (B1)	9% 0.11 mg
Riboflavin (B2)	2% 0.02 mg
Niacin (B3)	9% 1.44 mg
Pantothenic acid (B5)	10% 0.52 mg
Vitamin B6	18% 0.3 mg
Folate (B9)	3% 10 μg
Vitamin C	14% 13 mg
Minerals	Quantity %DV^{†}
Calcium	0% 5 mg
Iron	2% 0.31 mg
Magnesium	5% 22 mg
Manganese	6% 0.14 mg
Phosphorus	4% 44 mg
Potassium	13% 379 mg
Sodium	0% 4 mg
Zinc	3% 0.3 mg
- Other constituents: Quantity
- Water: 77 g
- Link to USDA Database entry
- ^{†}Percentages estimated using US recommendations for adults, except for potassium, which is estimated based on expert recommendation from the National Academies.

In a reference amount of 100 grams (3.5 oz), a boiled potato with skin supplies 87 calories and is 77% water, 20% carbohydrates (including 2% dietary fiber in the skin and flesh), 2% protein, and contains negligible fat (table). The protein content is comparable to other starchy vegetable staples, as well as grains.

Boiled potatoes are a moderate source (10–19% of the Daily Value, DV) of vitamin C (14% DV) and the B vitamins, vitamin B6 and pantothenic acid (table). Other than a moderate source of potassium (13% DV), boiled potatoes do not supply significant amounts of dietary minerals (table).

The potato is rarely eaten raw because raw potato starch is poorly digested by humans. Depending on the cultivar and preparation method, potatoes can have a high glycemic index (GI) and so are often excluded from the diets of individuals trying to follow a low-GI diet. There is a lack of evidence on the effect of potato consumption on obesity and diabetes.

In the UK, potatoes are not considered by the National Health Service as counting or contributing towards the recommended daily five portions of fruit and vegetables, the 5-A-Day program.

== Toxicity ==
Raw potatoes contain toxic glycoalkaloids, of which the most prevalent are solanine and chaconine. Solanine is found in other plants in the same family, Solanaceae, which includes such plants as deadly nightshade (Atropa belladonna), henbane (Hyoscyamus niger) and tobacco (Nicotiana spp.), as well as food plants like tomato. These compounds, which protect the potato plant from its predators, are especially concentrated in the aerial parts of the plant. The tubers are low in these toxins, unless they are exposed to light, which makes them go green.

Exposure to light, physical damage, and age increase glycoalkaloid content within the tuber. Different potato varieties contain different levels of glycoalkaloids. The 'Lenape' variety, released in 1967, was withdrawn in 1970 as it contained high levels of glycoalkaloids. Since then, breeders of new varieties test for this, sometimes discarding an otherwise promising cultivar. Breeders try to keep glycoalkaloid levels below 200 mg/kg (0.0032 oz/lb). However, when these commercial varieties turn green, their solanine concentrations can go well above this limit, with higher levels in the potato's skin.

Some toxic solanine-rich parts of the plant

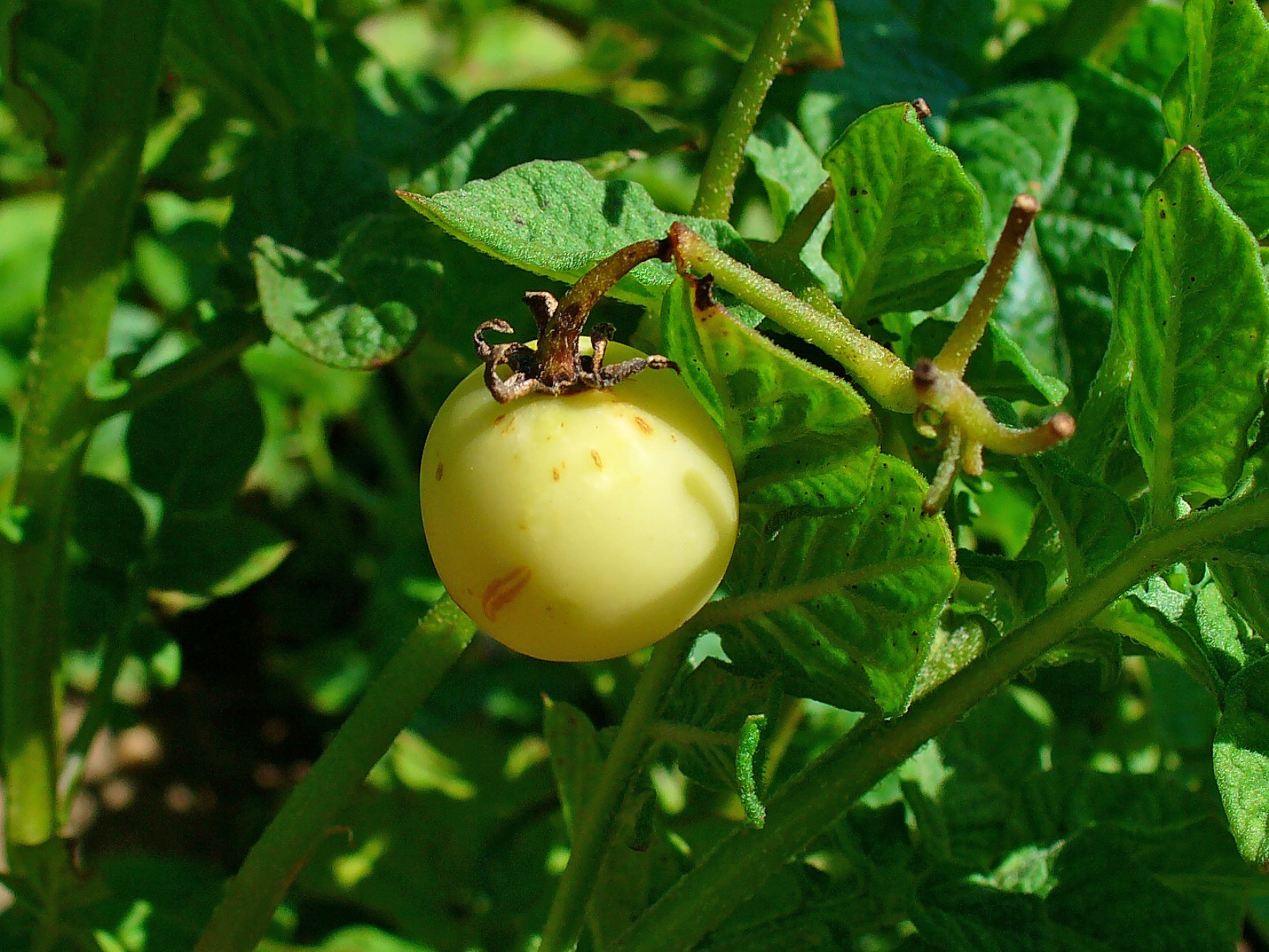
The inedible potato fruit

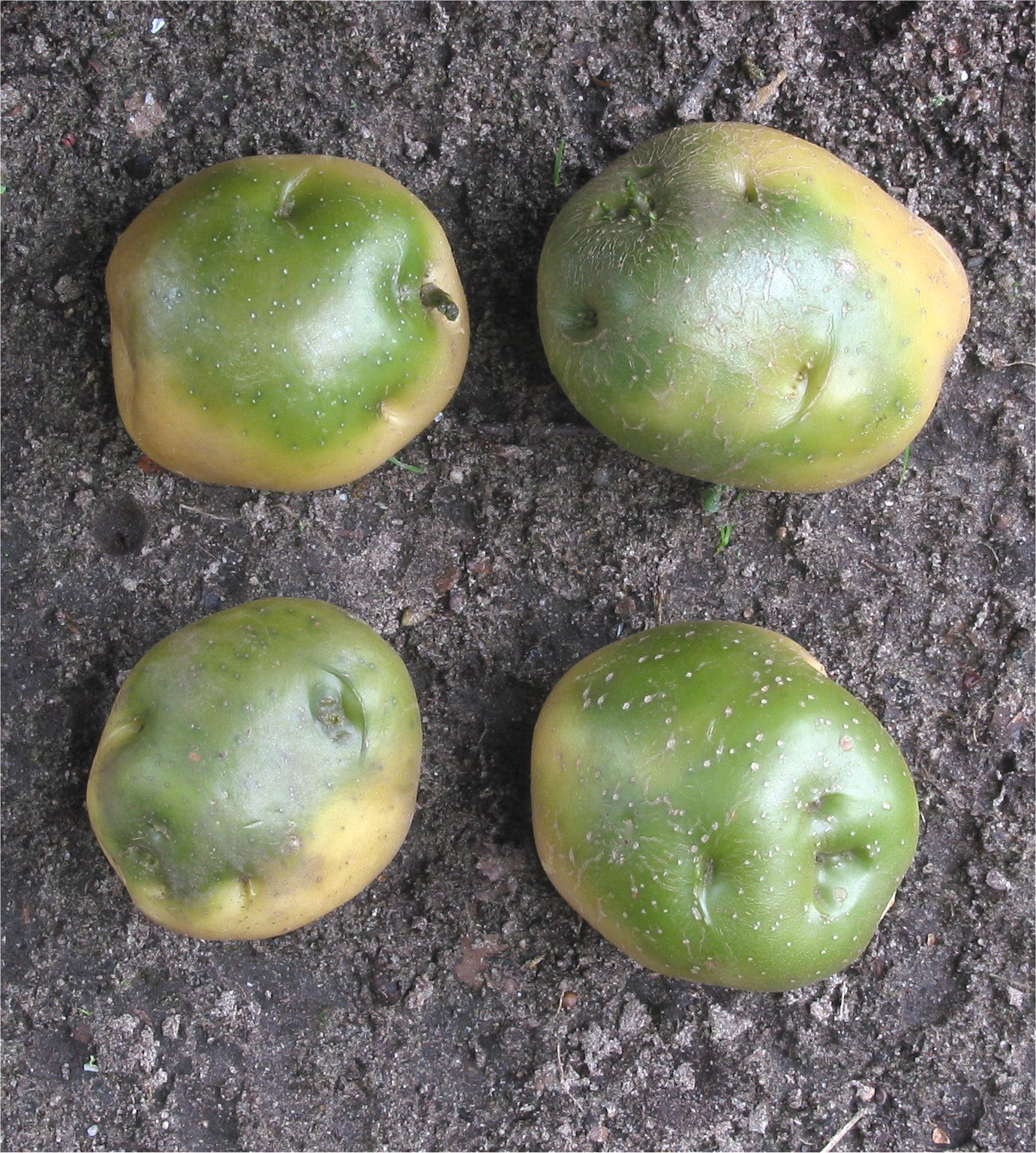
Tubers exposed to light

== Uses ==
=== Culinary ===
Potato dishes vary around the world. Peruvian cuisine naturally contains the potato as a primary ingredient in many dishes, as around 3,000 varieties of the tuber are grown there. Chuño is a freeze-dried potato product traditionally made by Quechua and Aymara communities of Peru and Bolivia. In the UK, potatoes form part of the traditional dish fish and chips. Roast potatoes are commonly served as part of a Sunday roast dinner and mashed potatoes form a major component of several other traditional dishes, such as shepherd's pie, bubble and squeak, and bangers and mash. New potatoes may be cooked with mint and are often served with butter. In Germany, Northern Europe (Finland, Latvia and especially Scandinavian countries), Eastern Europe (Russia, Belarus and Ukraine) and Poland, newly harvested, early ripening varieties are considered a special delicacy. Boiled whole and served un-peeled with dill, these "new potatoes" are traditionally consumed with Baltic herring. Puddings made from grated potatoes (kugel, kugelis, and potato babka) are popular items of Ashkenazi, Lithuanian, and Belarusian cuisine. Cepelinai, the national dish of Lithuania, are dumplings made from boiled grated potatoes, usually stuffed with minced meat. In Italy, in the Friuli region, potatoes serve to make a type of pasta called gnocchi. Potato is used in northern China where rice is not easily grown, a popular dish being 青椒土豆丝 (qīng jiāo tǔ dòu sī), made with green pepper, vinegar and thin slices of potato. In the winter, roadside sellers in northern China sell roasted potatoes.

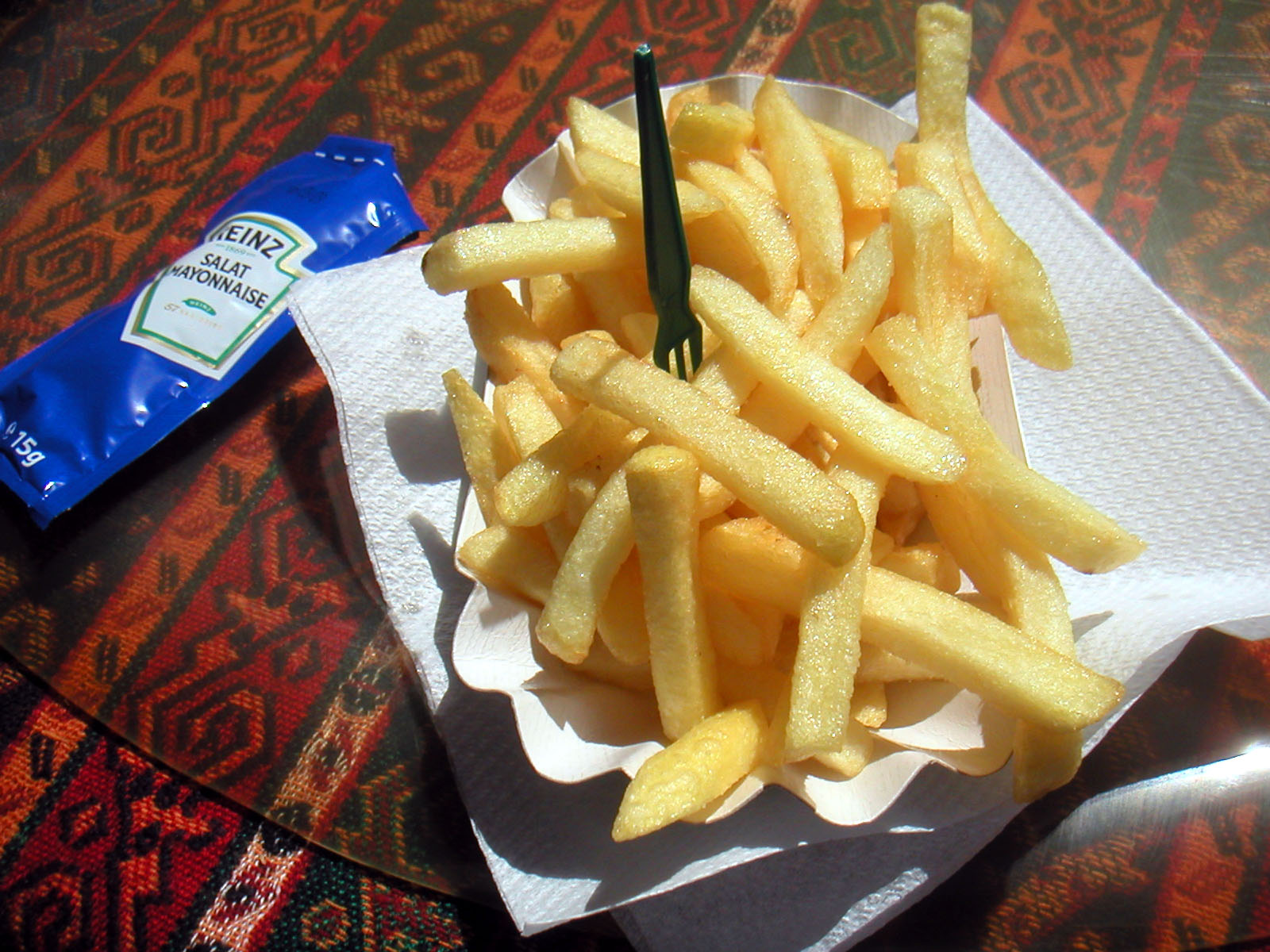
Pommes frites, also called chips and French fries

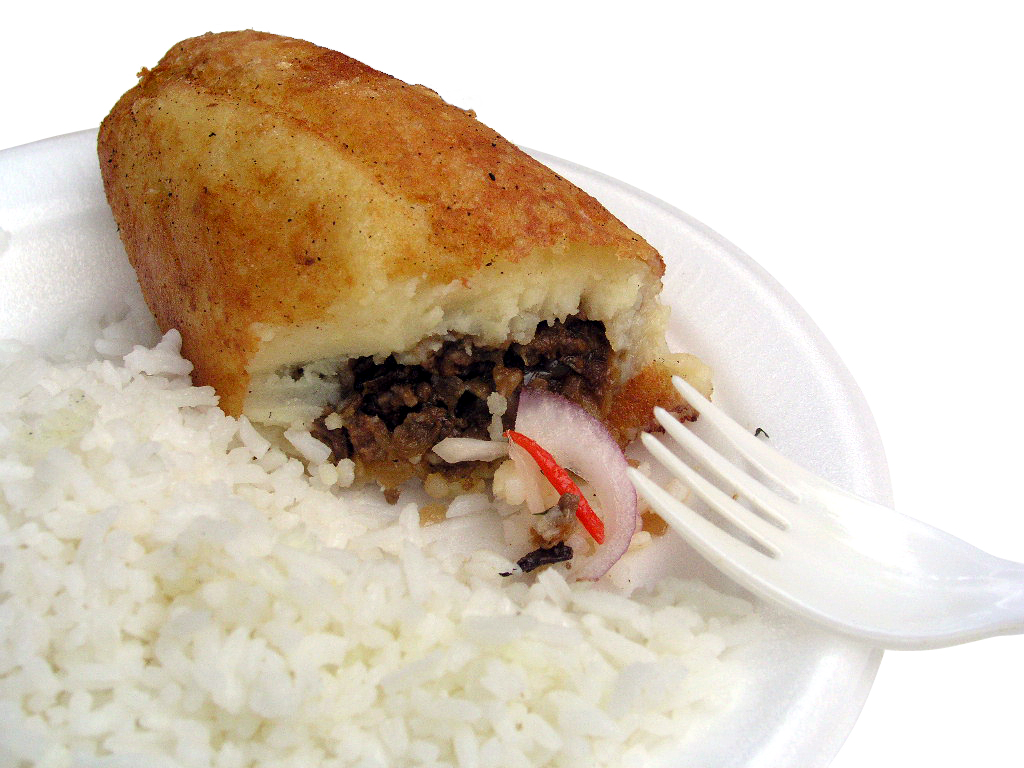
Papa rellena

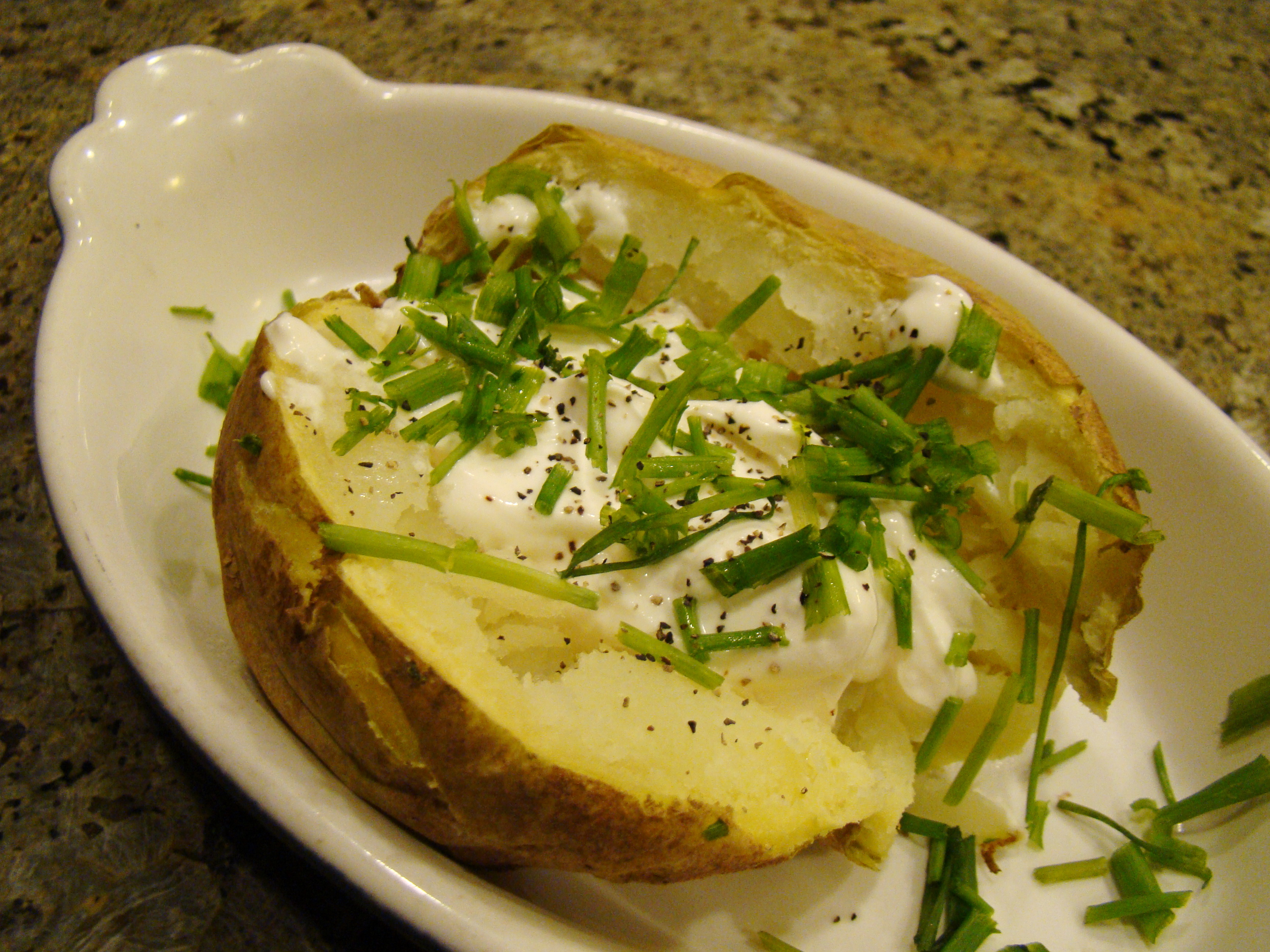
Baked potato with sour cream and chives

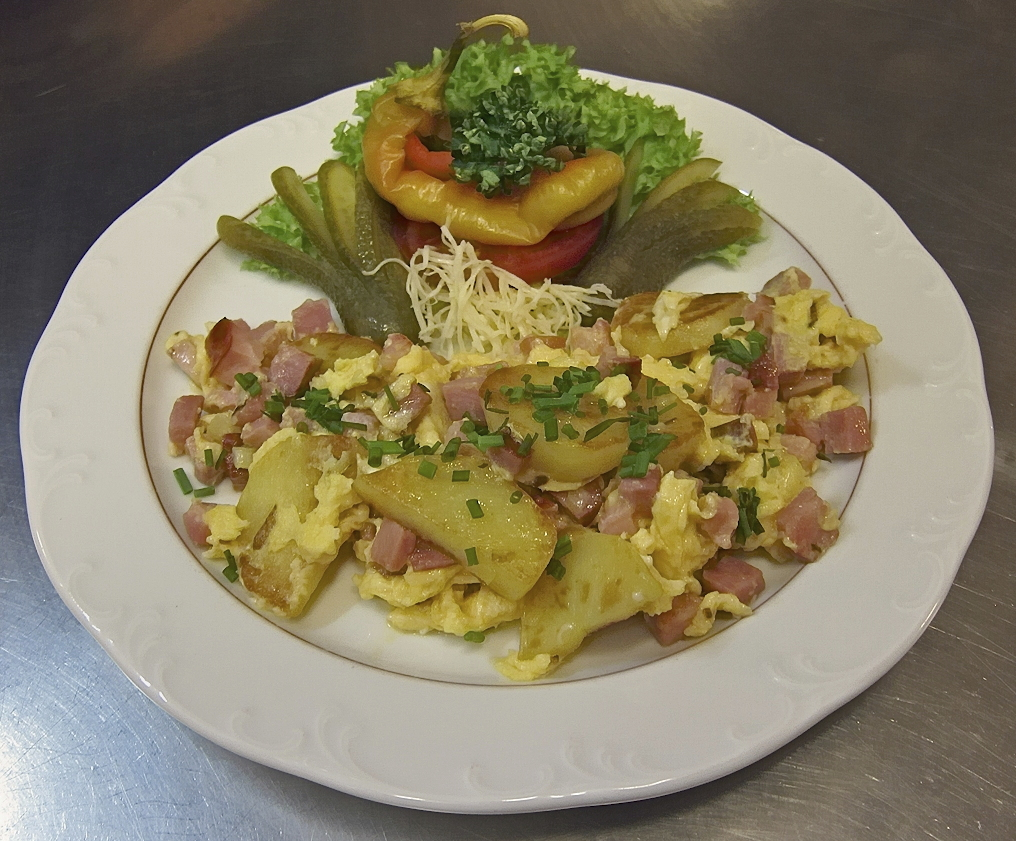
German Bauernfrühstück ("farmer's breakfast")

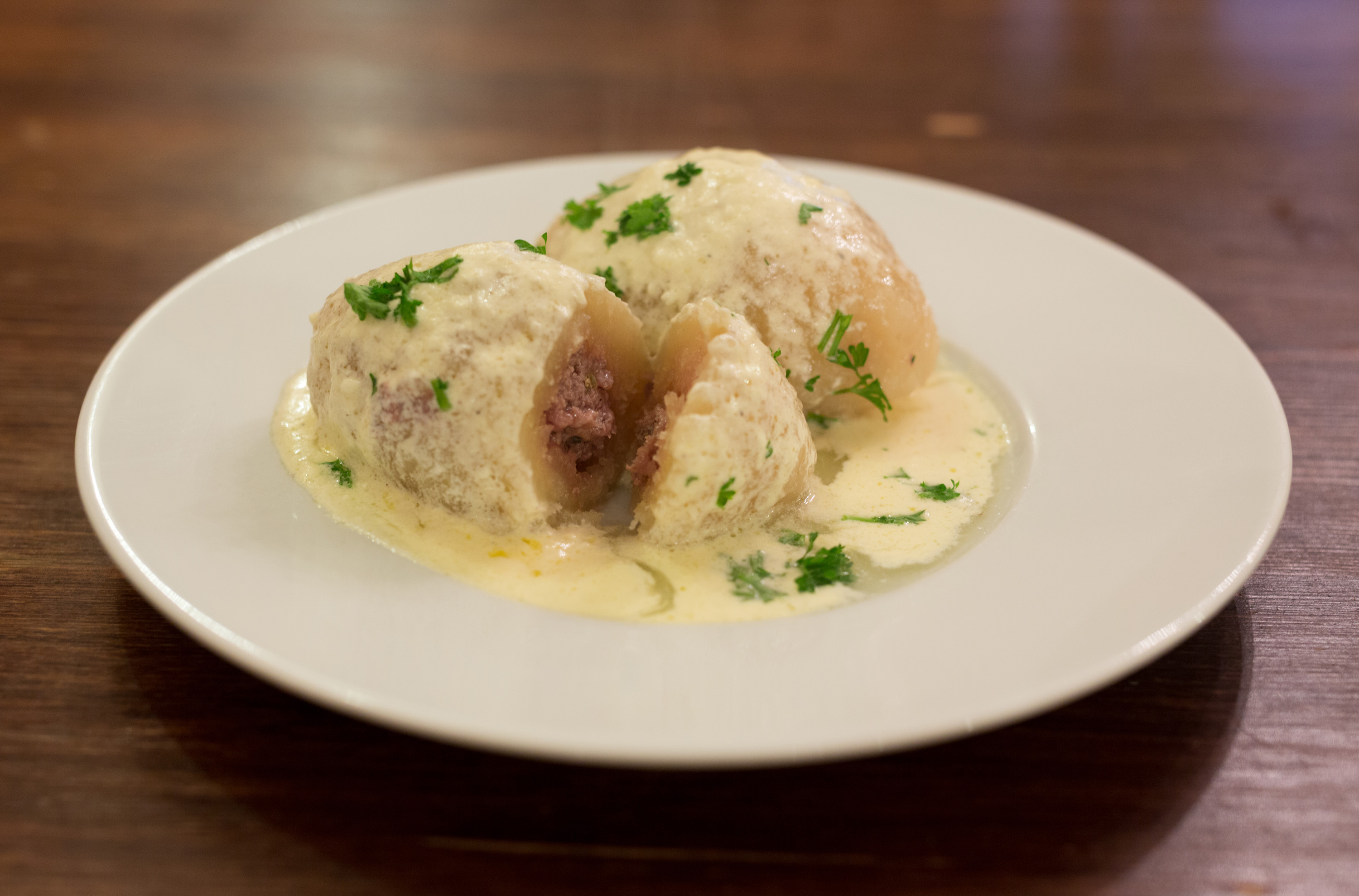
Cepelinai

=== Other uses ===
Potatoes are sometimes used to brew alcoholic spirits such as vodka, poitín, akvavit, and brännvin.

Potatoes are used as fodder for livestock. They may be made into silage which can be stored for some months before use.

Potato starch is used in the food industry as a thickener and binder for soups and sauces, in the textile industry as an adhesive, and in the paper industry for the manufacturing of papers and boards.

Potatoes are commonly used in plant research. The consistent parenchyma tissue, the clonal nature of the plant and the low metabolic activity make it an ideal model tissue for experiments on wound-response studies and electron transport.

== Cultural significance ==
=== In mythology ===
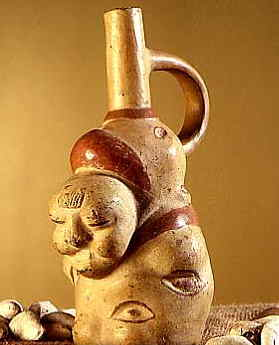
Axomamma, Incan goddess of potatoes

In Inca mythology, a daughter of the earth mother Pachamama, Axomamma, is the goddess of potatoes. She ensured the fertility of the soil and the growth of the tubers. According to Haudenosaunee (Iroquois) mythology, the first potatoes grew out of Earth Woman's feet after she died giving birth to her twin sons, Sapling and Flint.

=== In art ===
The potato has been an essential crop in the Andes since the pre-Columbian era. The Moche culture from Northern Peru made ceramics from the earth, water, and fire. This pottery was a sacred substance, formed in significant shapes and used to represent important themes. Potatoes are represented anthropomorphically as well as naturally. During the late 19th century, numerous images of potato harvesting appeared in European art, including the works of Willem Witsen and Anton Mauve. Van Gogh's 1885 painting The Potato Eaters portrays a family eating potatoes. Van Gogh said he wanted to depict peasants as they really were. He deliberately chose coarse and ugly models, thinking that they would be natural and unspoiled in his finished work. Jean-François Millet's The Potato Harvest depicts peasants working in the plains between Barbizon and Chailly. It presents a theme representative of the peasants' struggle for survival. Millet's technique for this work incorporated paste-like pigments thickly applied over a coarsely textured canvas.

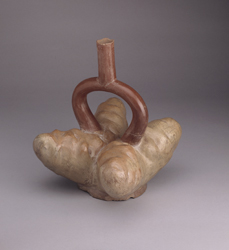
Potato ceramic from the Moche culture

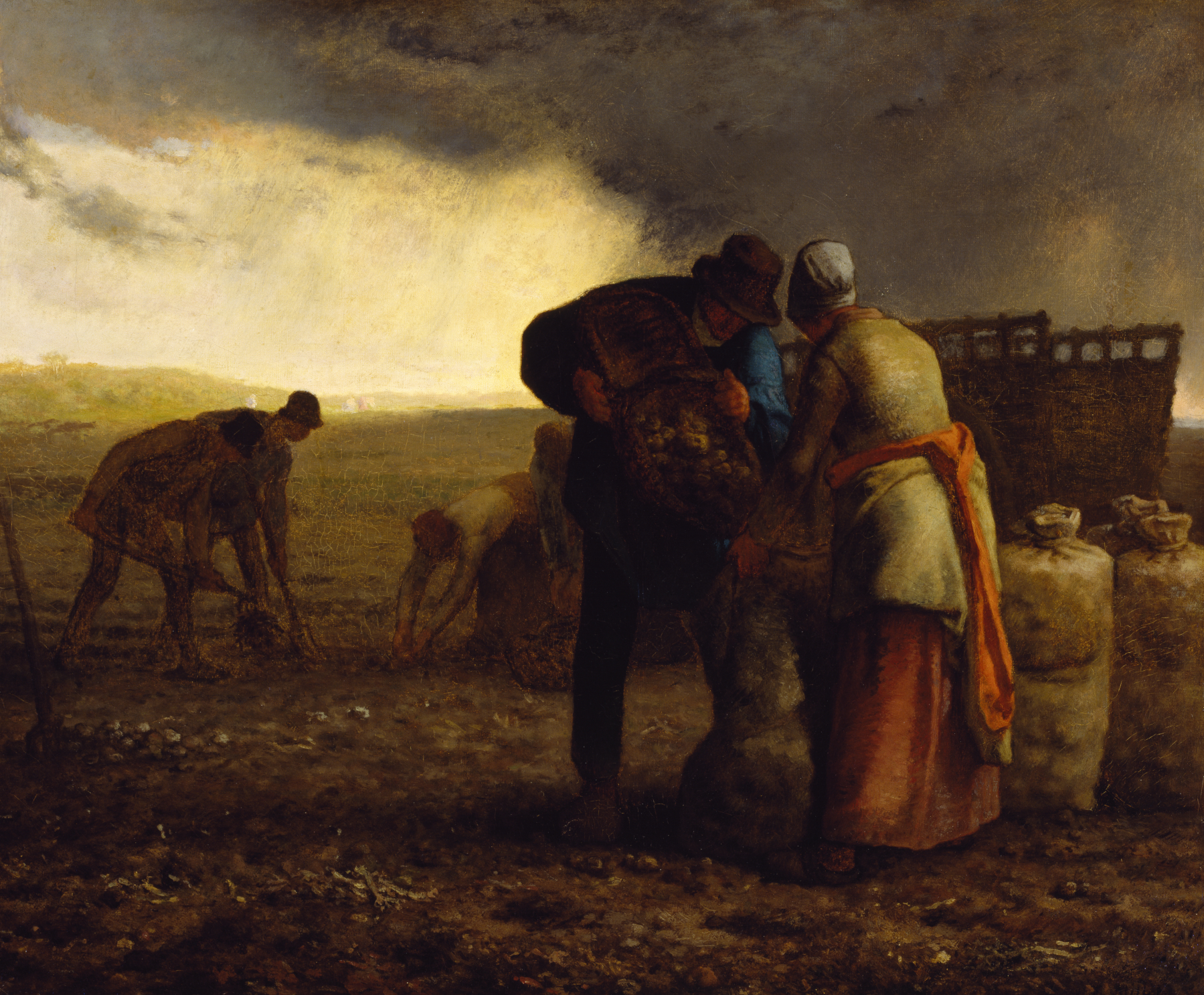
The Potato Harvest by Jean-François Millet, 1855 (Walters Art Museum)

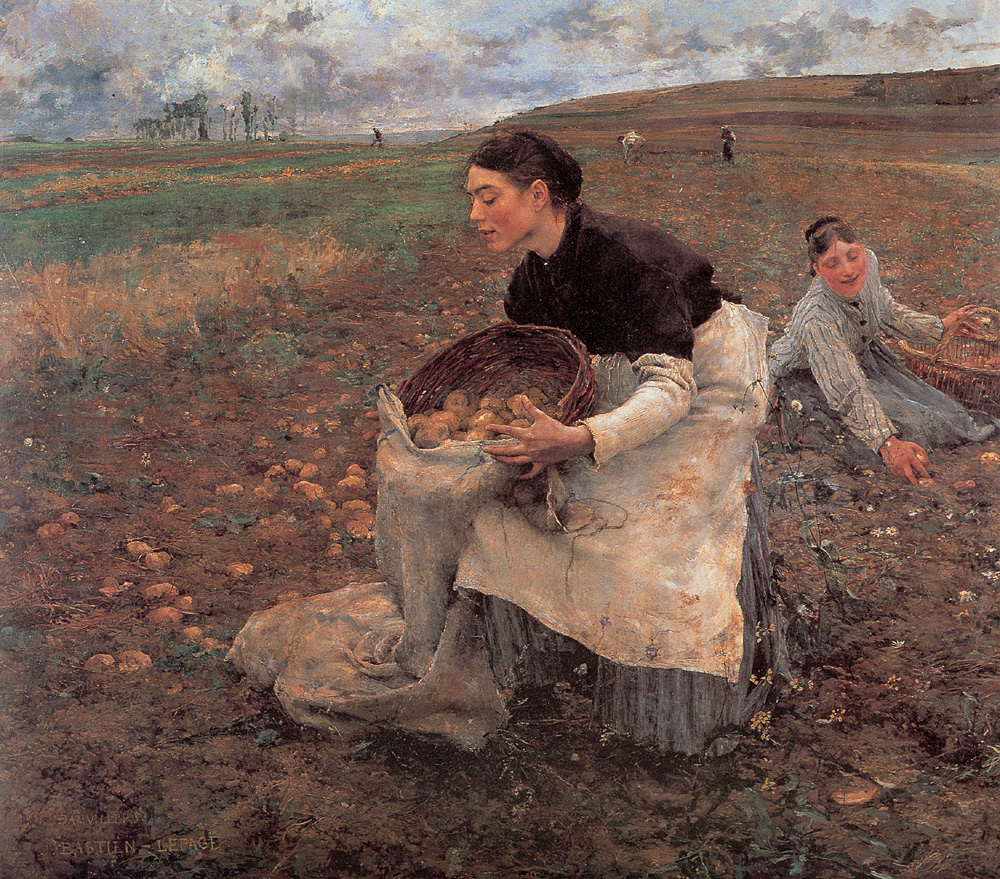
The potato harvest by Jules Bastien-Lepage, 1877, National Gallery of Victoria

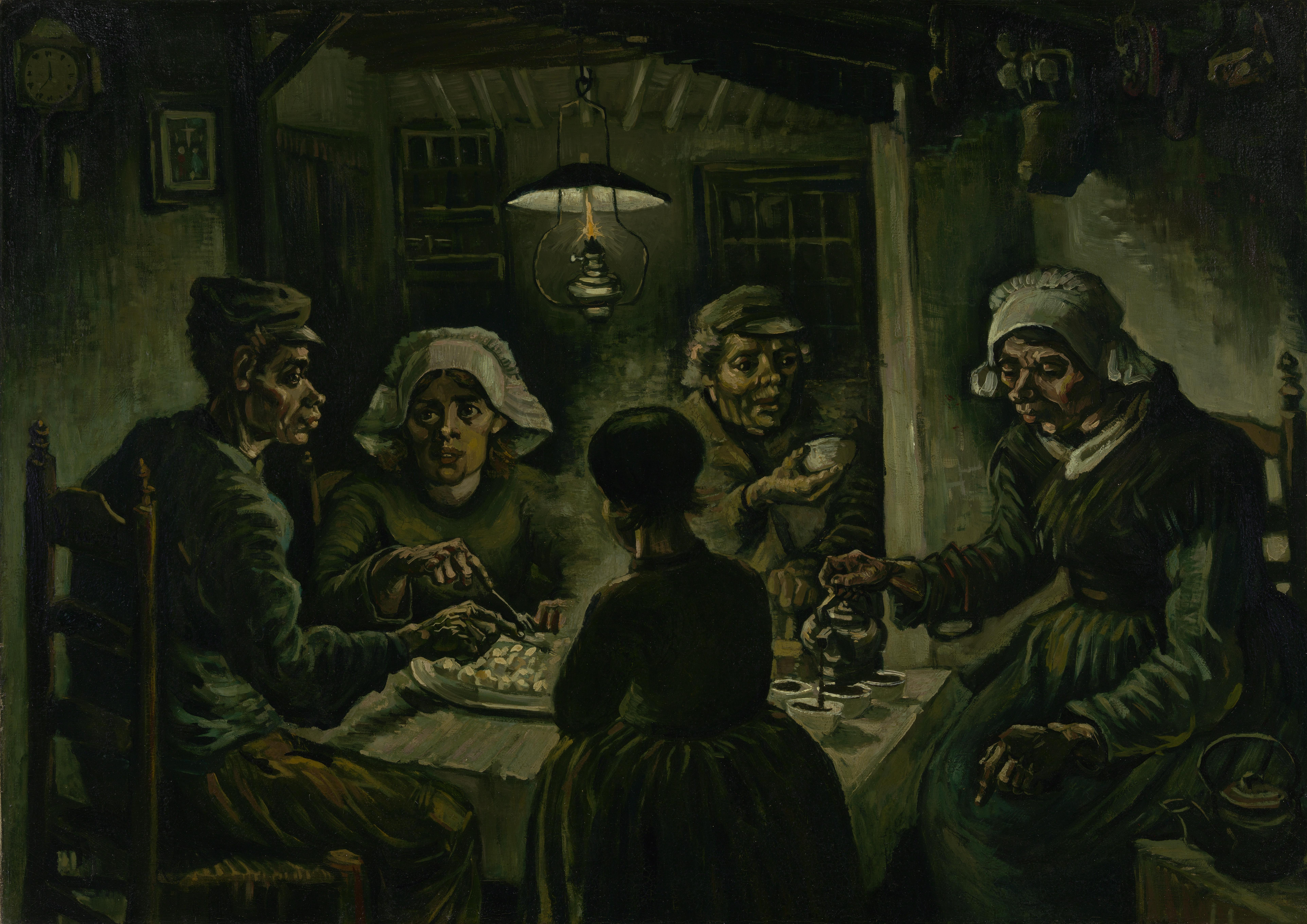
The Potato Eaters by Van Gogh, 1885 (Van Gogh Museum)

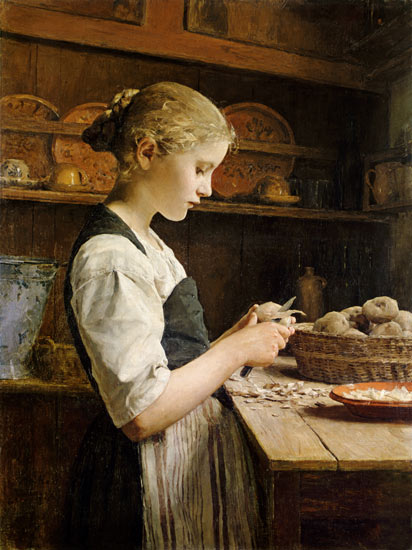
Girl peeling potatoes by Albert Anker, 1886, oil on canvas

=== In popular culture ===
Invented in 1949, and marketed and sold commercially by Hasbro in 1952, Mr. Potato Head is an American toy that consists of a plastic potato and attachable plastic parts, such as ears and eyes, to make a face. It was the first toy ever advertised on television.

In the 2015 science fiction film The Martian, the protagonist, a stranded astronaut and botanist named Mark Watney, cultivates potatoes on Mars using Martian soil fertilized with frozen feces.

== See also ==
- Great Famine (Ireland)
- Irish potato candy
- List of potato dishes
- List of potato museums
- Loy (spade), a form of early spade used in Ireland for the cultivation of potatoes
- New World crops
- Potato battery
- International Year of the Potato
