= European Cultivated Potato Database =

Online collaborative database of potato variety descriptions

The European Cultivated Potato Database (ECPD) is an online collaborative database of potato variety descriptions. The information that it contains can be searched by variety name, or by selecting one or more required characteristics.

- 159,848 observations
- 29 contributors
- 91 characters
- 4,119 cultivated varieties
- 1,354 breeding lines

The data is indexed by variety, character, country of origin, and contributor. There is a facility to select a variety and to find similar varieties based upon botanical characteristics.

ECPD is the result of collaboration between participants in eight European Union countries and five East European countries. It is intended to be a source of information on varieties maintained by them. More than twenty-three scientific organisations are contributing to this information source.

The database is maintained and updated by the Scottish Agricultural Science Agency within the framework of the European Cooperative Programme for Crop Genetic Resources Networks (ECP/GR), which is organised by Bioversity International. The European Cultivated Potato Database was created to advance the conservation and use of genetic diversity for the well-being of present and future generations.
