= Foxhol =

- Village
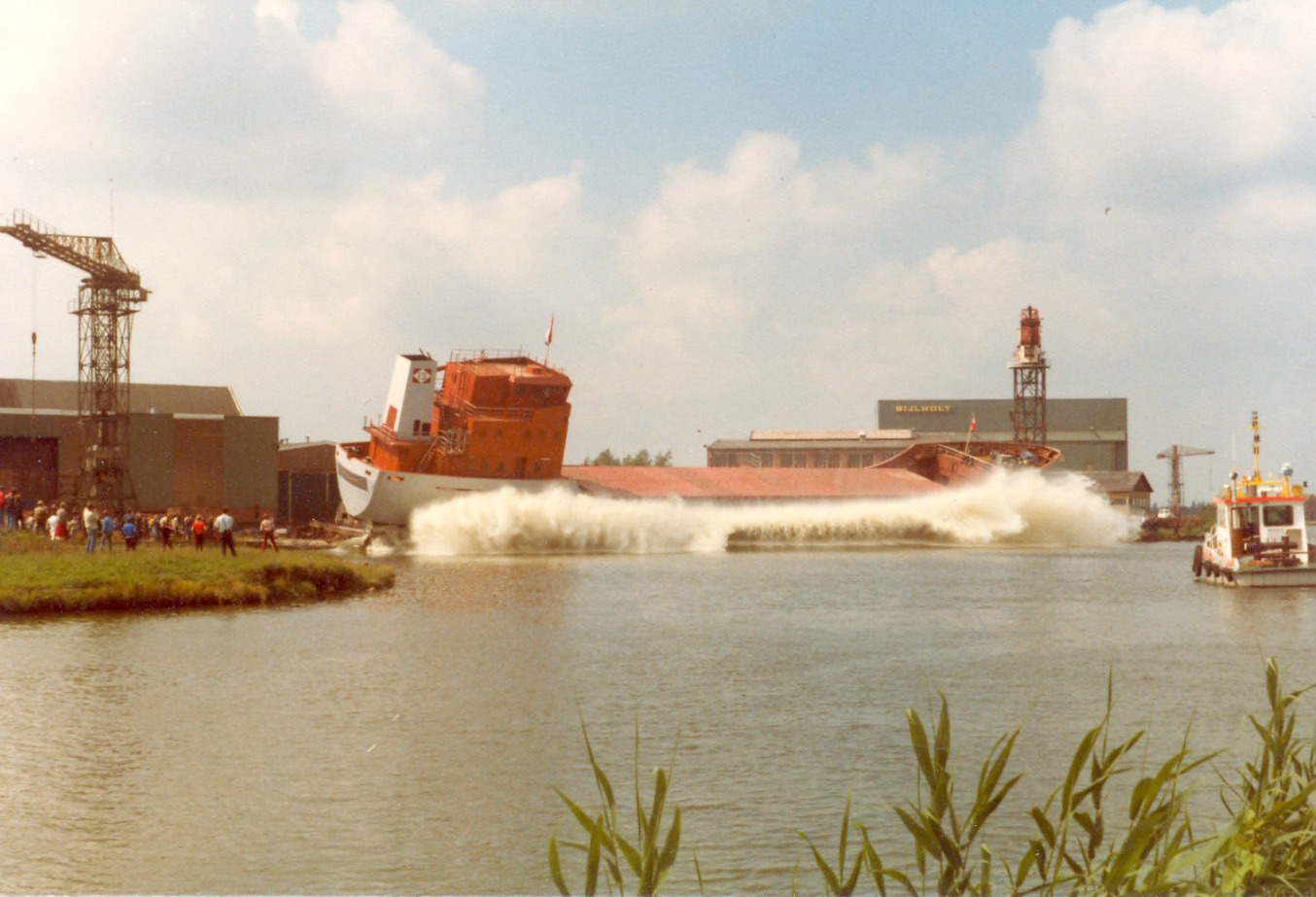
- Angelique-V is launched in Foxhol (1981)

- Location in province of Groningen in the Netherlands Foxhol (Netherlands)
- Coordinates: 53.16778°N 6.72125°E
- Country: Netherlands
- Province: Groningen
- Municipality: Midden-Groningen

Area
  - Total: 1.73 km^{2} (0.67 sq mi)
- Elevation: 1 m (3.3 ft)

Population (2021)
  - Total: 970
  - Density: 560/km^{2} (1,500/sq mi)
- Time zone: UTC+1 (CET)
  - Summer (DST): UTC+2 (CEST)
- Postal code: 9607
- Dialing code: 0598

Foxhol is a village in the Dutch province of Groningen. It is part of the municipality of Midden-Groningen. In 1842, the potato starch factory Eureka was founded in Foxhol by Willem Albert Scholten. Foxhol became an industrial area with factories and shipyards. The village is nowadays part of the urban area of Hoogezand.

== History ==
The name means fox hole. It is sometimes explained as relating to Nittert Fox, a Saxon knight who was killed in 1499 at Foxhol, however the village was first mentioned in 1460 as Vossehol.

Foxhol is located next to the Foxholstermeer, a large lake. The earliest inhabitants were fishermen and hunters. In 1594, the city of the Groningen started to exploit the peat in the area around Foxhol. In 1612, a canal was dug which would later become the Winschoterdiep. In 1840, the population of Foxhol and neighbouring Foxholsterbosch was 395 people. In 1868, the Kropswolde railway station was opened on the Harlingen–Nieuweschans railway. Even though it is named after Kropswolde, it is located in Foxhol.

== Industry ==
Willem Albert Scholten wanted to establish a paint and coatings factory. He went to Germany to study the industry, and discovered that they used potato starch in their dyes. Scholten became fascinated with the numerous potential uses of starch. The main problem was the transportation costs of the potatoes. In 1842, the Eureka factory was opened in Foxhol, because it was close to the potato fields, near a lake with clean water, and well connected to the outside world.

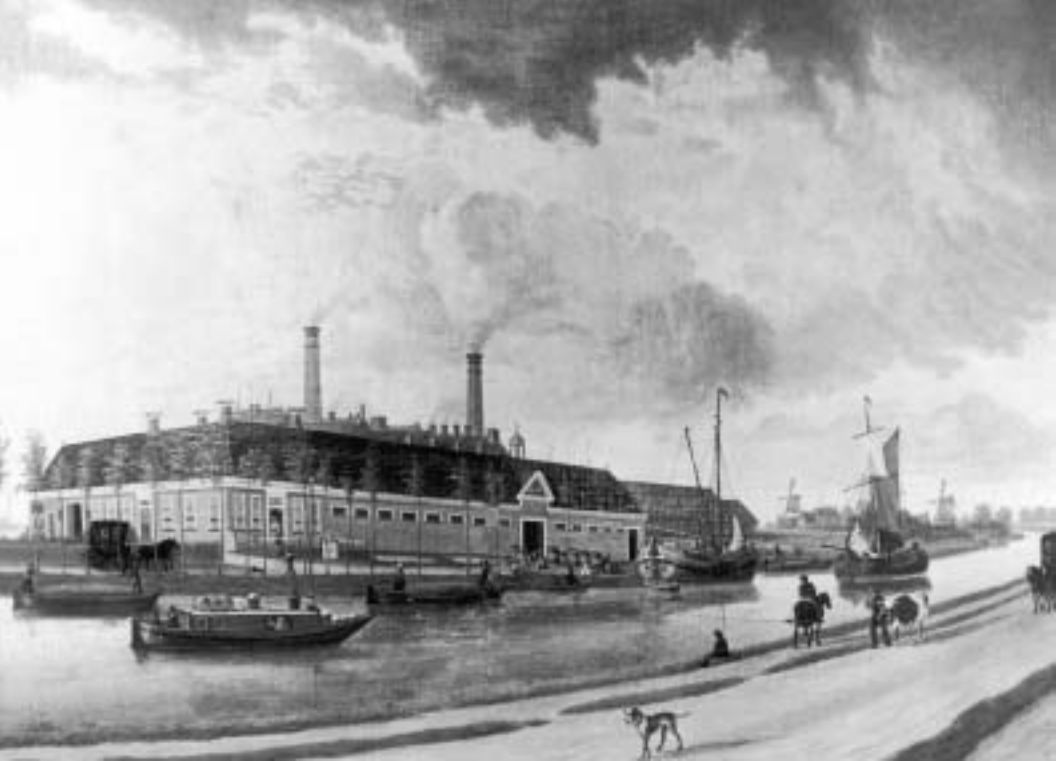
Painting of Eureka (c. 1868)

Eureka was very successful, and Scholten would end up owning 24 factories across Europe, and was one of the founders of the Nederlandsch-Amerikaansche Stoomvaart-Maatschappij which became later known as the Holland America Line.

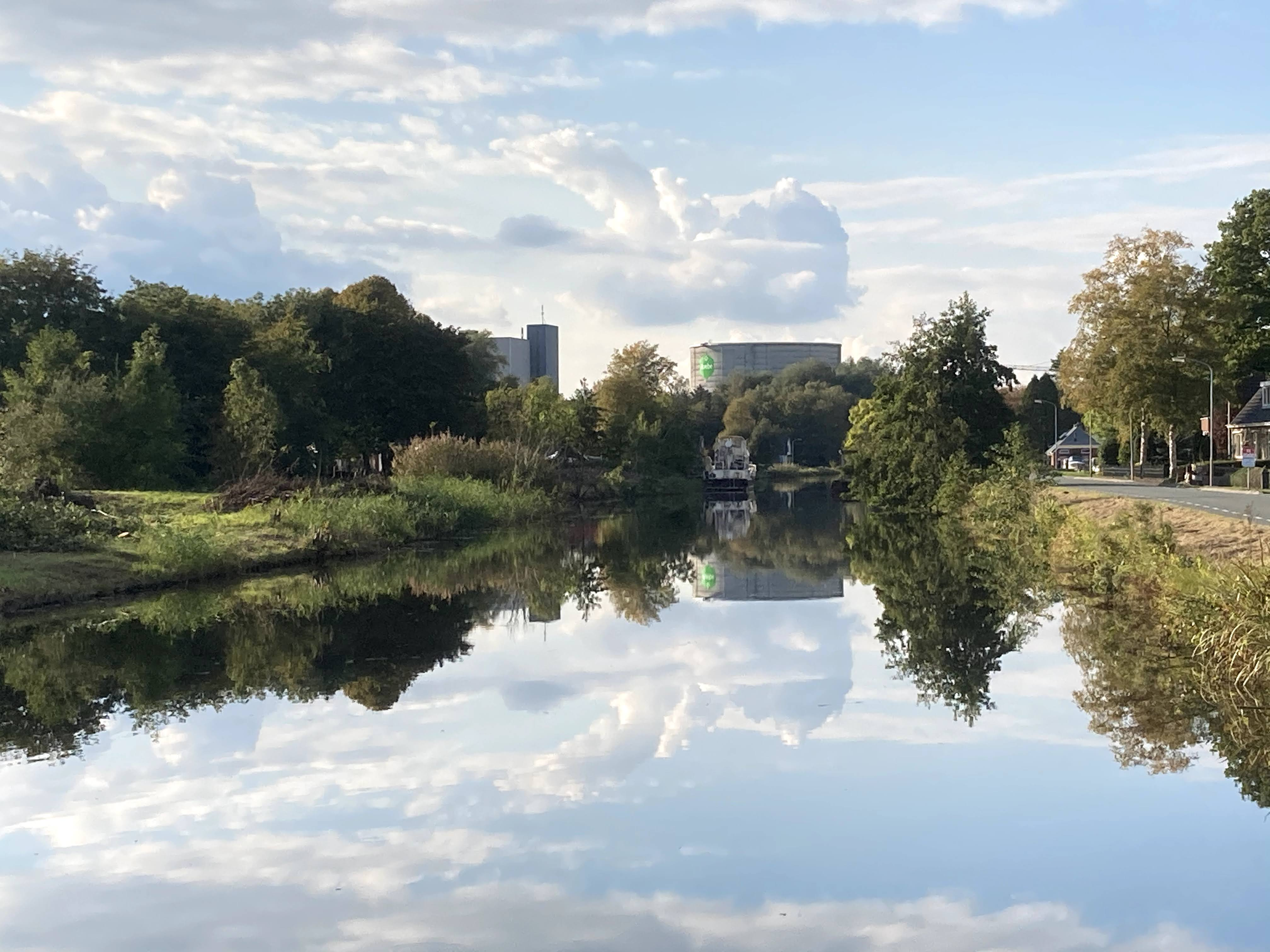
Winschoterdiep in Foxhol with factories in the background

The potato starch factory attracted other industry and shipyards to Foxhol. During World War II, exports had stopped and there was a shortage of fuel and supplies. Frederik André Möller worked in the laboratory of Eureka and had tried to develop an instant breakfast cereal, due to the popularity of corn flakes in the United States. The first attempts with potato starch failed, but it could be made with wheat. In 1943, the Brinta factory opened in Foxhol. It was a cheap surrogate product, therefore, after World War II, an extensive publicity campaign started to propagate Brinta. In 2006, Brinta was bought by Heinz who moved to factory to Nijmegen. The potato starch factory is nowadays owned by Royal Avebe.

== South Moluccans ==
In 1949, Indonesia became independent, and the Royal Netherlands East Indies Army was disbanded. The islands of Ambon, Buru, and Seram had fought on side of the Netherlands. They were opposed to a Java-dominated Indonesia, and proclaimed the Republic of South Maluku which resulted in an attack by Indonesia. In 1951, 12,000 refugees from South Maluku were temporarily resettled in the Netherlands. In September 1953, a group of refugees was placed in barracks at Carel Coenraadpolder. The 311 people at Coenraadpolder were members of CRAMS, a resistance organisation which aimed to liberate South Maluku.

On 14 December 1961, a new neighbourhood had been constructed in Foxhol for the Moluccans. A group of 129 people refused to leave the barracks, because accepting the houses would imply accepting permanent exile. On the dawn of 21 December, the barracks were raided by the police, and the people were forcibly moved to Foxhol. In 1965, the Maranatha church was built in Foxhol by the Moluccans.

== Recent history ==
Foxhol has become a single urban area with Hoogezand. Retail has disappeared from the village, and the centre has been redeveloped in 2010. The Maranatha church was replaced by the Petrus Church in 1995. Most of the Moluccan community has moved on, and in 2009, there were an estimated 10 to 15 families still living in Foxhol. Foxhol is still predominantly an industrial area.
