= Drouwen =

- Village
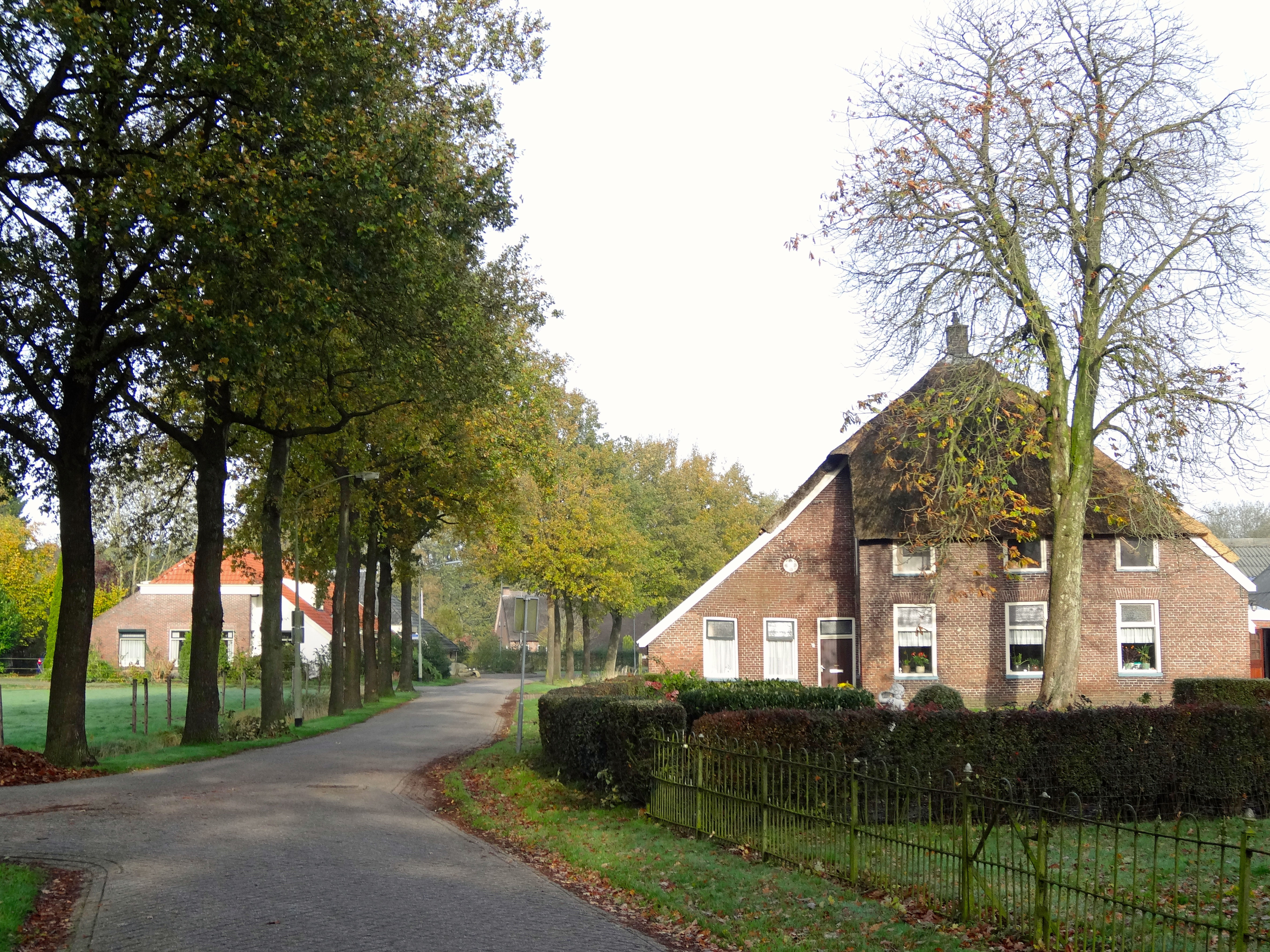
- Farmhouses in 2013

- Location in the province of Drenthe in the Netherlands Drouwen (Netherlands)
- Coordinates: 52°57′N 6°48′E
- Country: Netherlands
- Province: Drenthe
- Municipality: Borger-Odoorn

Area (2015)
  - Total: 73 km^{2} (28 sq mi)
  - Land: 73 km^{2} (28 sq mi)
  - Water: 0 km^{2} (0 sq mi)

Population (2015)
  - Total: 430
  - Density: 5.9/km^{2} (15/sq mi)

Drouwen (Dutch pronunciation: [ˈdrʌu.ə(n)]) is a village in the Dutch province of Drenthe. It is a part of the municipality of Borger-Odoorn, and lies about 17 km east of Assen.

== History ==
The village was first mentioned between 1381 and 1383 as "to Druwen". The etymology is unclear. Drouwen developed as an esdorp in the Early Middle Ages. It was probably a satellite of Borger. The village has no church, but does have four essen (communal pastures).

During the 18th century, the depletion of the soil resulted in a continual increasing sandy area, and a large forest was planted around Drouwen.

Drouwen was home to 362 people in 1840.

== Dolmen ==
There are three hunebedden (Dolmen) near Drouwen: D19, D20 and D26. There used to be more. In the 18th century, sixteen sites were listed near Drouwen and Bronneger which implies that the area used to the centre of a civilisation between 3500 and 3000 BC.

D19 and D20 are close to one-another and near a main road. They have been extensively researched by Albert Egges van Giffen. D19 used to have 8 capstones, however one is missing. D20 used to have 6 capstones, but also one is missing. There is still a near complete ring of 21 stones around the dolmen. 400 pots, 13 flint axes and 6 pieces of copper have been discovered near the dolmen. The copper objects are a mystery, because they must have been made in Romania.

D26 is hard to access. It contains 5 capstones in their original place. A part of the dolmen is partially under ground. It was extensively researched between 1968 and 1970. It is also the last, because there is nowadays reluctance to disturb the original layouts.

== Gallery ==
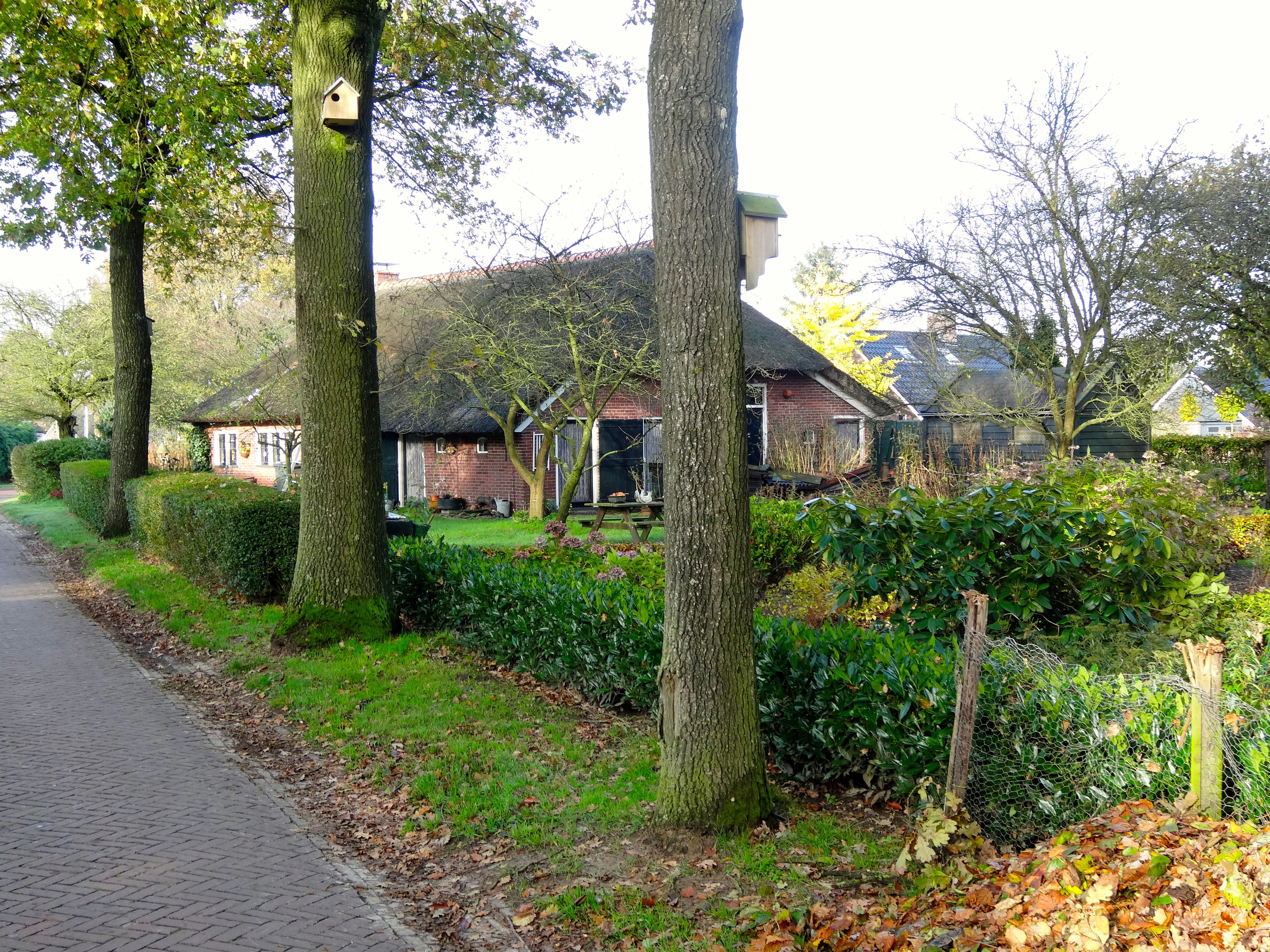
Schoolstraat

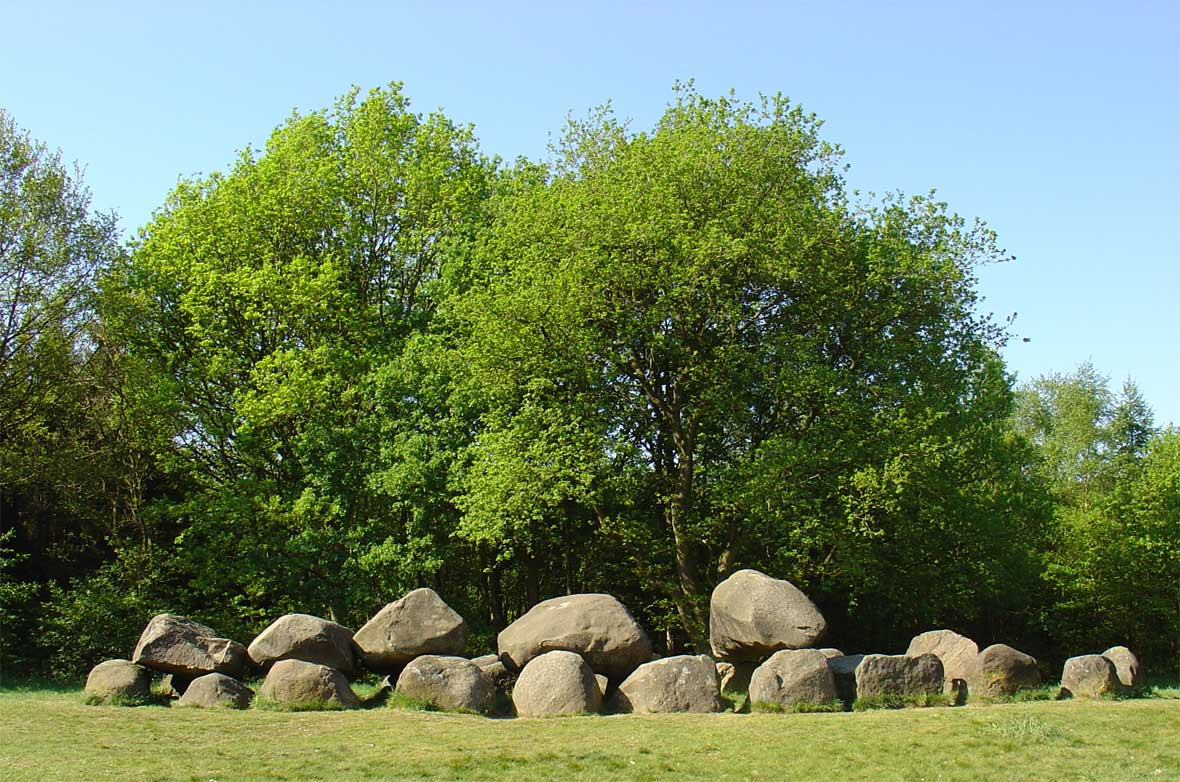
Dolmen D19 at Drouwen

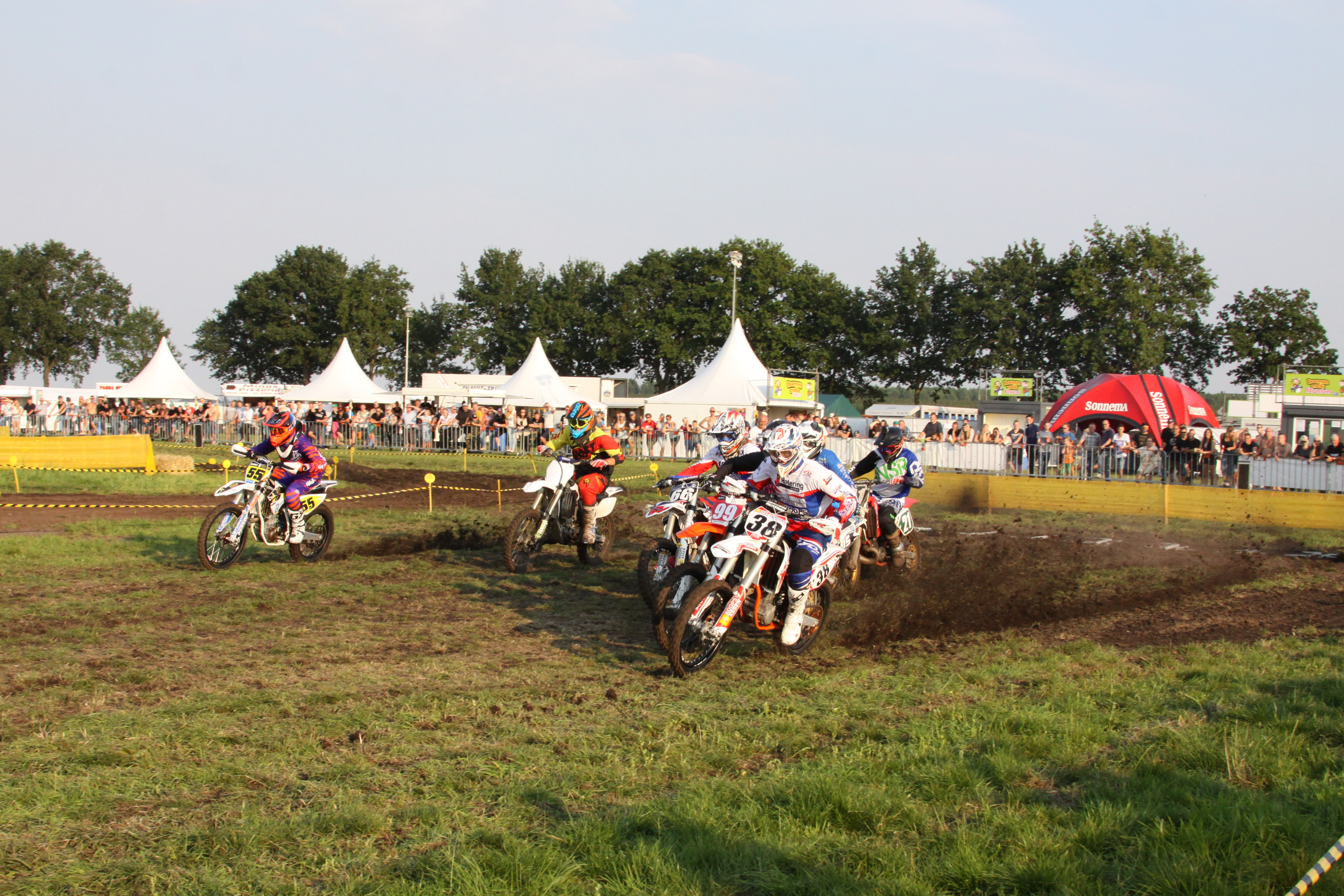
Farmer's rock and motocross festival

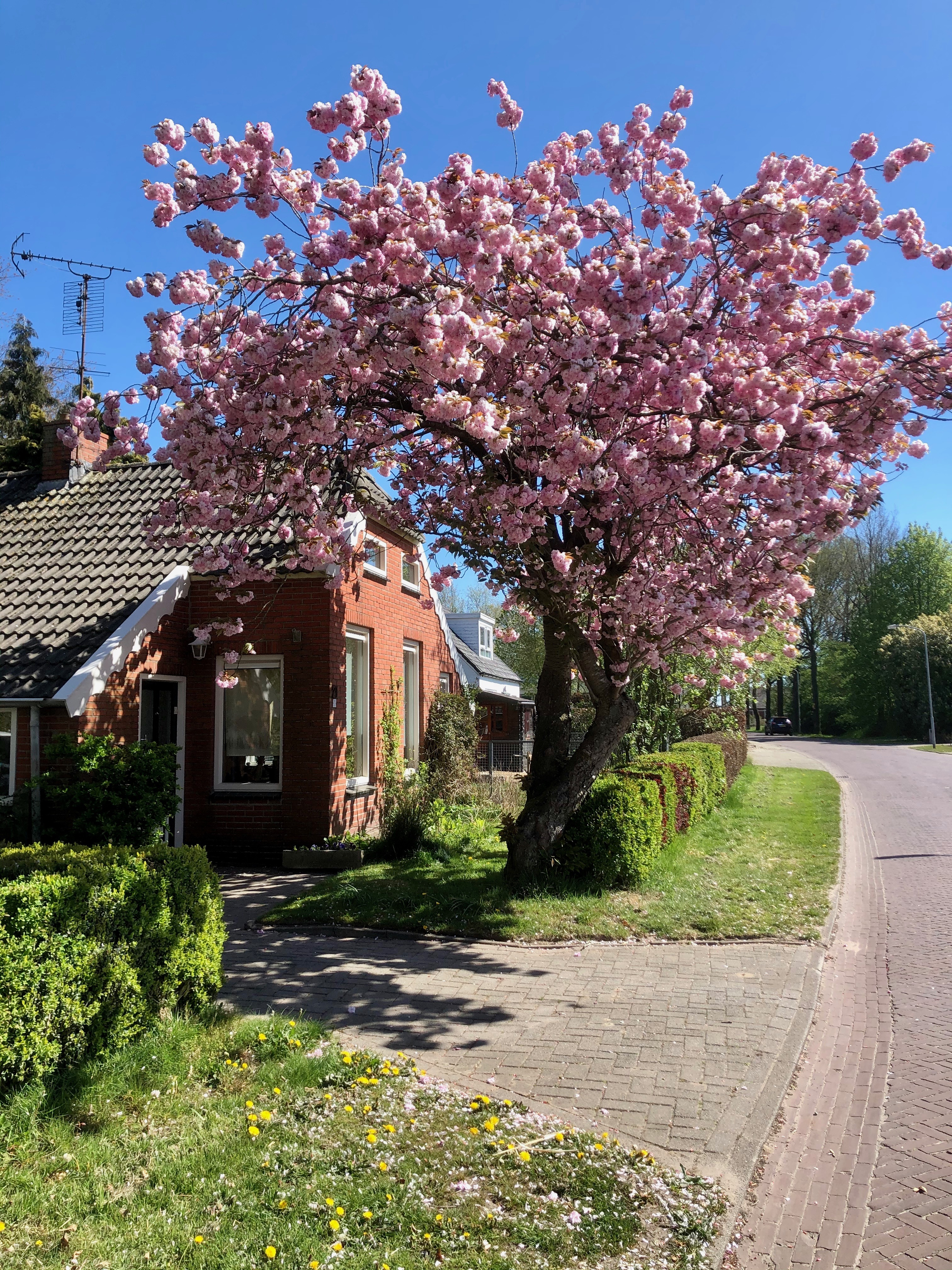
In bloom
