= Bronneger =

Bronneger Brönneger
- Village
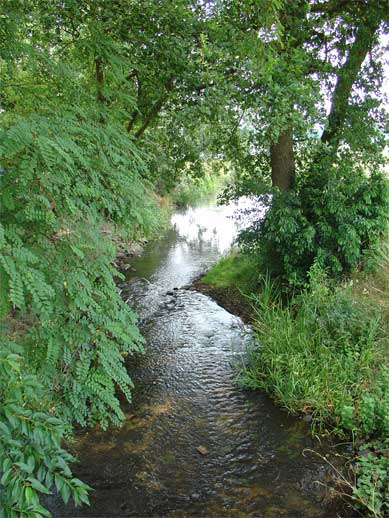
- The Voorste Diep near Bronneger

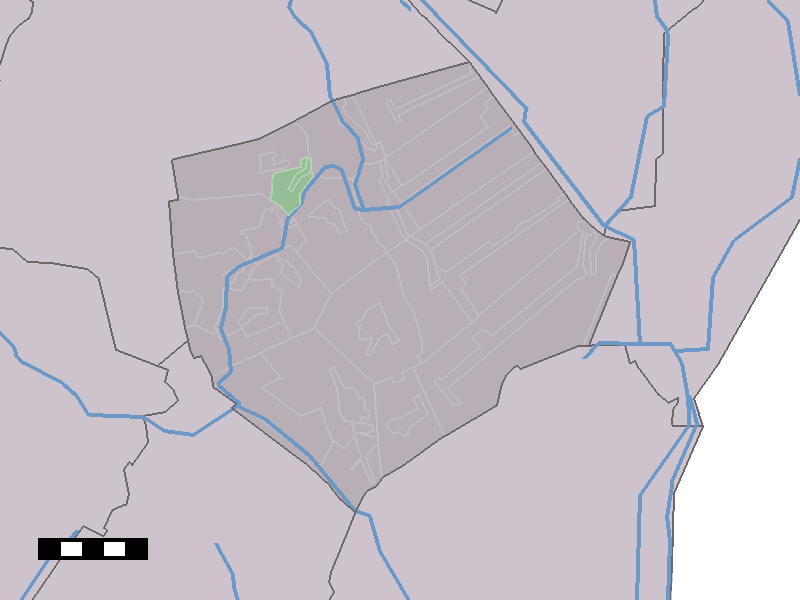
- Bronneger in the municipality of Borger-Odoorn.

- Location of the village in the province of Drenthe Bronneger (Netherlands)
- Coordinates: 52°57′N 6°49′E
- Country: Netherlands
- Province: Drenthe
- Municipality: Borger-Odoorn

Area
  - Total: 2.50 km^{2} (0.97 sq mi)
- Elevation: 10 m (33 ft)

Population (2021)
  - Total: 120
  - Density: 48/km^{2} (120/sq mi)
- Time zone: UTC+1 (CET)
  - Summer (DST): UTC+2 (CEST)
- Postal code: 9527
- Dialing code: 0599

Bronneger is a small village in the Dutch province of Drenthe. It is a part of the municipality of Borger-Odoorn, and lies about 18 km east of Assen.

== History ==
The village was first mentioned between 1381 and 1383 as "te Bronyncgem", and means "settlement of the people of Bruno (person)". Bronneger is an esdorp which developed as a satellite of Drouwen. It is an elongated settlement without a church.

Bronneger was home to 90 people in 1840. In the 1990s, there was a stupa and Buddhist monastery in Bronneger, however it moved to Makkinga. The owner was later involved in a sexual abuse scandal and the monastery has since been dissolved.

== Dolmen ==
There are five hunebedden (dolmen) near Bronneger: D21-D25. Hunebed D21 is one of the prettiest. It consists of three large capstone, and large birch tree next to the stones has taken the role of capstone as well. The site was investigated by Albert Egges van Giffen in 1918, and much pottery was discovered. The cellar measured 6.50 by 2.20 metres and had a height of 1.50 to 1.70 metres. A missing side stone was discovered in the cellar and has been placed back in its original position.

D21 is very small, and five stones are almost completely buried in the sand. D21 is in good condition, and consists of four capstones and eight side stones. It is partially submerged in the sand.

== Gallery ==
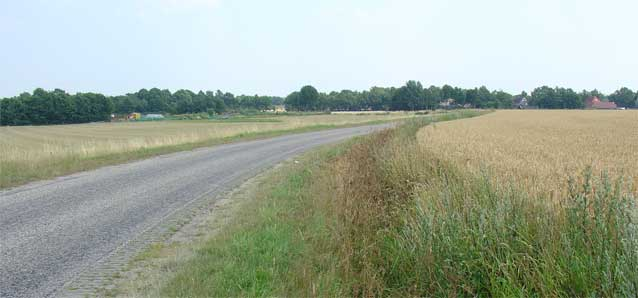
View of the hamlet Bronneger

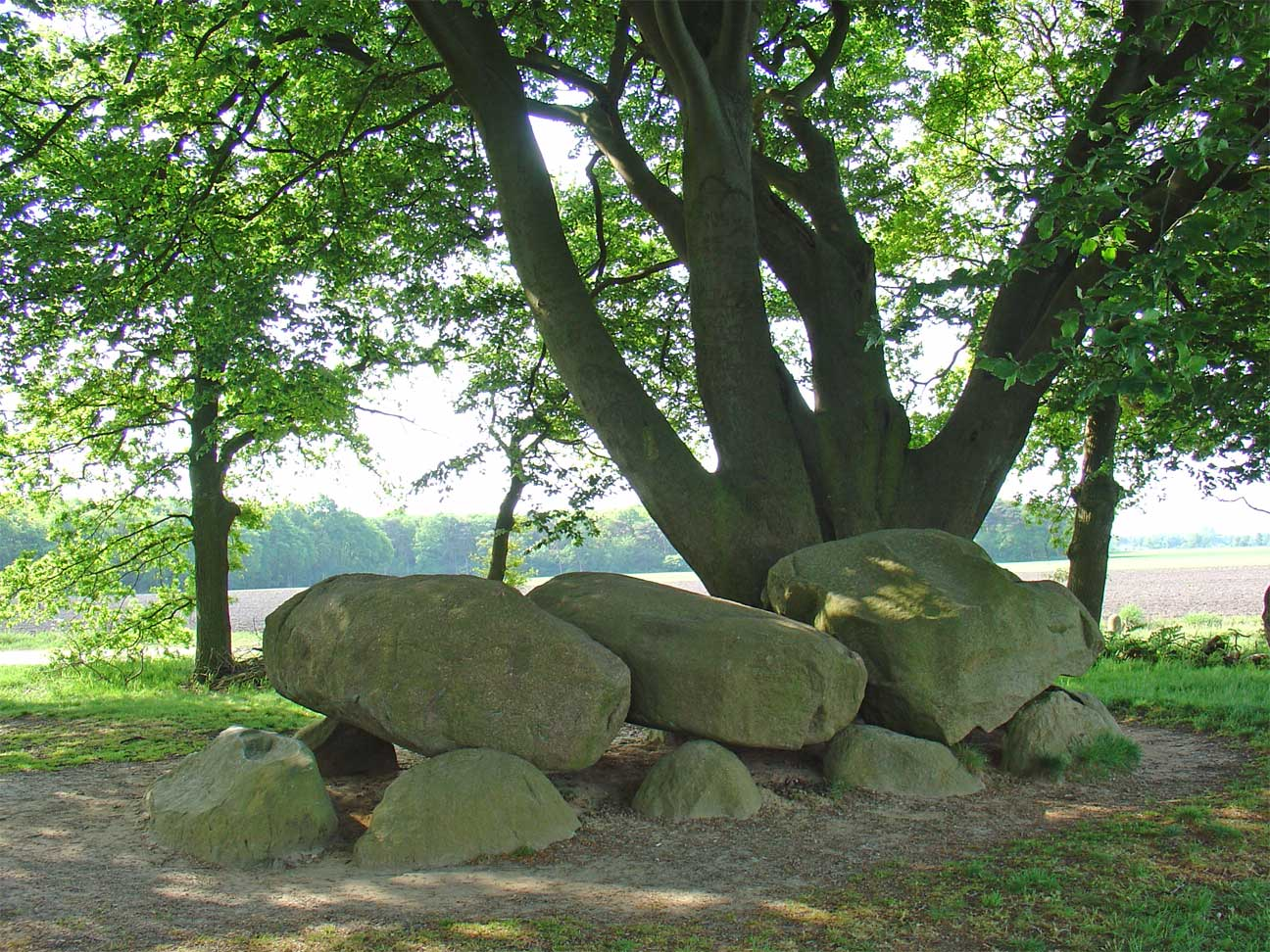
Hunebed (dolmen) D21

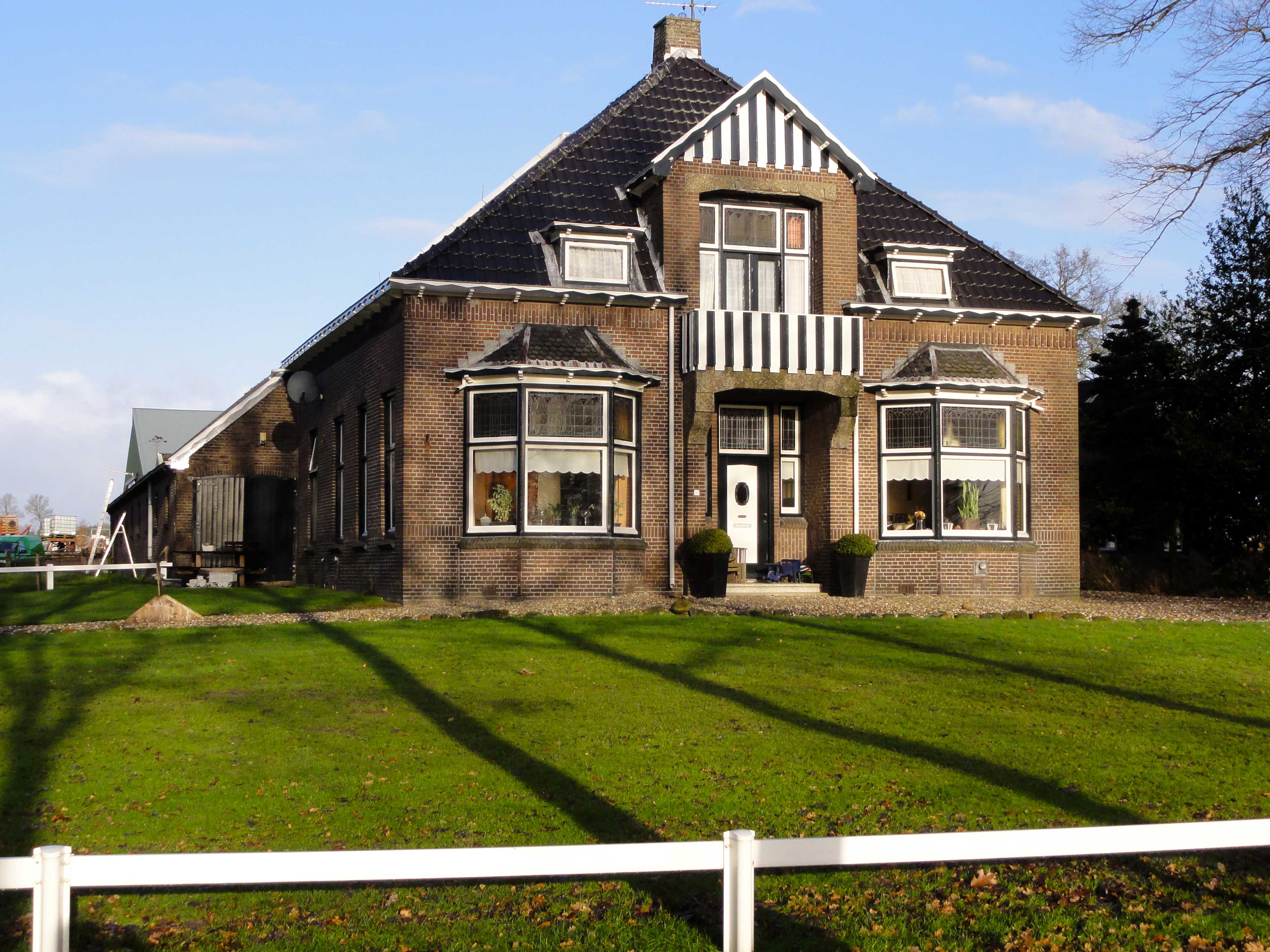
Farm in Bronneger

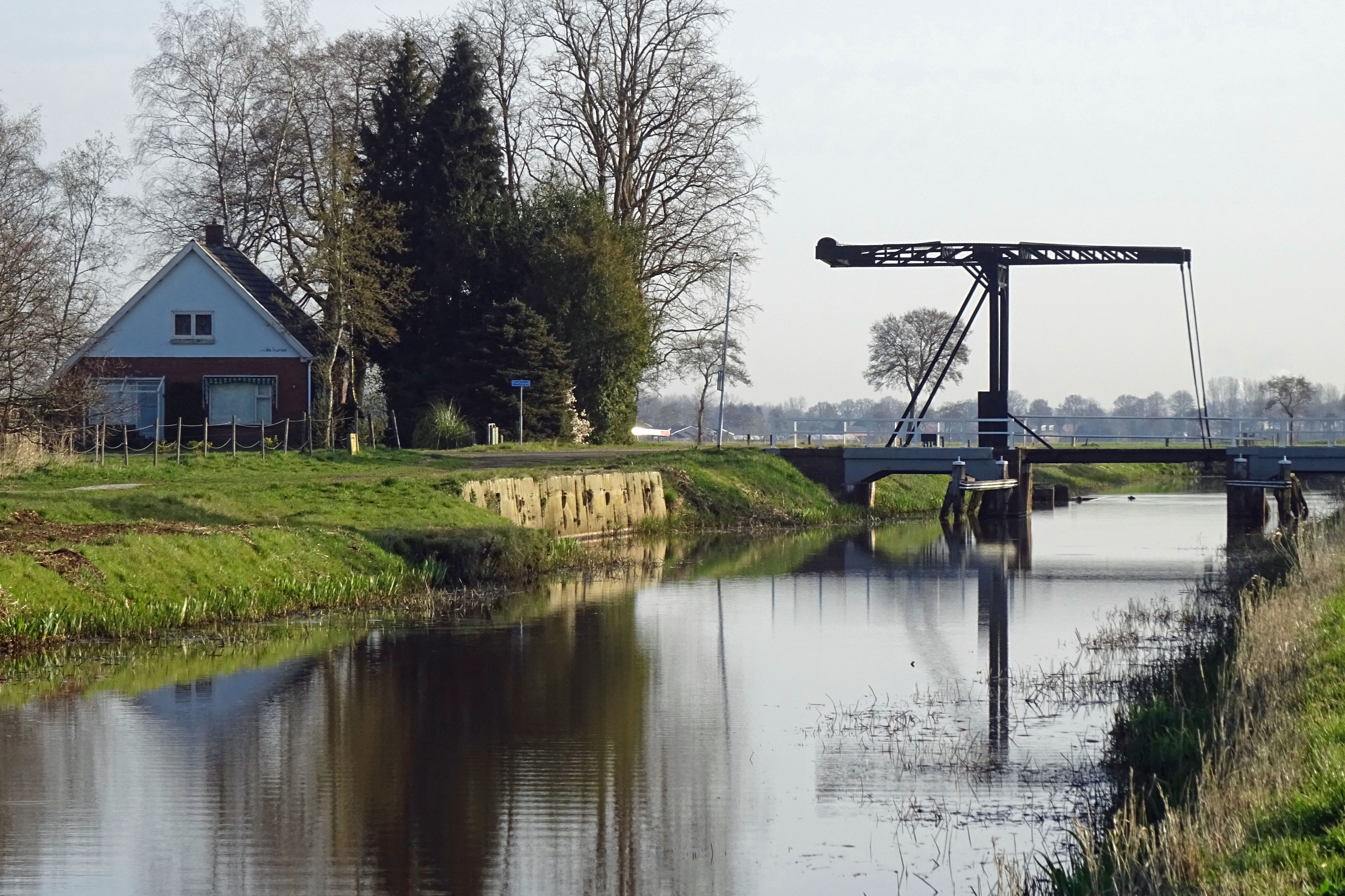
Draw bridge in Bronneger
