= Nittert Fox =

Saxon Military Figure

Nittert Fox, also known as Neithart Fuchs (killed at Foxhol 22 July 1499) was a Saxon knight and military commander.

According to his hatchment, Fox came from an influential family from Franconia (Germany). As a military commander he became involved in the war between the Vetkopers and Schieringers in Friesland and Groningen. In 1495, he occupied Bolsward and the town of Workum had to pay protection money. Later on Fox and his army sought shelter in Sneek. The Schieringers Bokke Harinxma and Grietman Louw Donia tried to flee the city, but were imprisoned by Fox. Fox demanded a ransom for these two men. The people of Sneek asked the city of Groningen to help. Fox left the country in May 1496, after the ransom was paid.

In 1498 Fox and his army raided the Westerkwartier in the province of Groningen. He was employed by the Duke of Saxony, Albert III, who together with Edzard I struggled for power in the northern parts of the present Netherlands. This led to a battle at Noordhorn between Fox's army and the army of Groningen. This battle was won by Fox's army, but Fox's army officer Jurjen van Reijnsberg was killed. To get revenge, Noordhorn and Zuidhorn were burned. The Saxon army also occupied the monastery of Aduard. The chieftains of the Ommelanden negotiated with Fox to avoid further destruction and paid the ransom.

In July 1499 Fox clashed with the Groningers again. This time at the Vrouwenlaan (Women's Avenue) close to the village of Foxhol. According to tradition he was wounded, but continued to fight and was eventually killed.

In recognition of his qualities as a warrior, Fox's body was buried in the church of the Franciscan monastery in the city of Groningen by his opponents. His gravestone contained the following text:

Hier leit den held – Wiens herte noyt besweek – Nog in het veld – Oyt voor zijn vijand week: – Die, als hij zag – Zijn Volk verslagen wert, – Vogt, daar hij lag, – Nog met een manlijk hert

The hatchment was hung at his grave and disappeared during or before 1743, but the Latin text has been preserved.

IMA FRANCONIA NITERDUM VULPES ALUMNA / HERBIPOLI QUONDAM FOVIT IN ORBE POTENS / MARTIS ERAM DECUS AC EQUITUM PEDITUMQUE MONARCHA / MAGNUS ET IMMENSI BELLIGER ORBIS ERAM / INNUMEROS DOMUI POPULOS, VILLAGIA ET URBES / ACER ET ARMI POTENS ALTER ACHILLES EGO / INDOMITOS SUEVOS GLADIO VIBRANTE SUBEGI / INSOLITOQUE IUGO SUBSTRAVI FRISIONES

According to some writers the village of Foxhol was named after Nittert Fox. But it was already mentioned as Vossehol (Foxhole) in 1460.
