= Noordhorn =

- Village
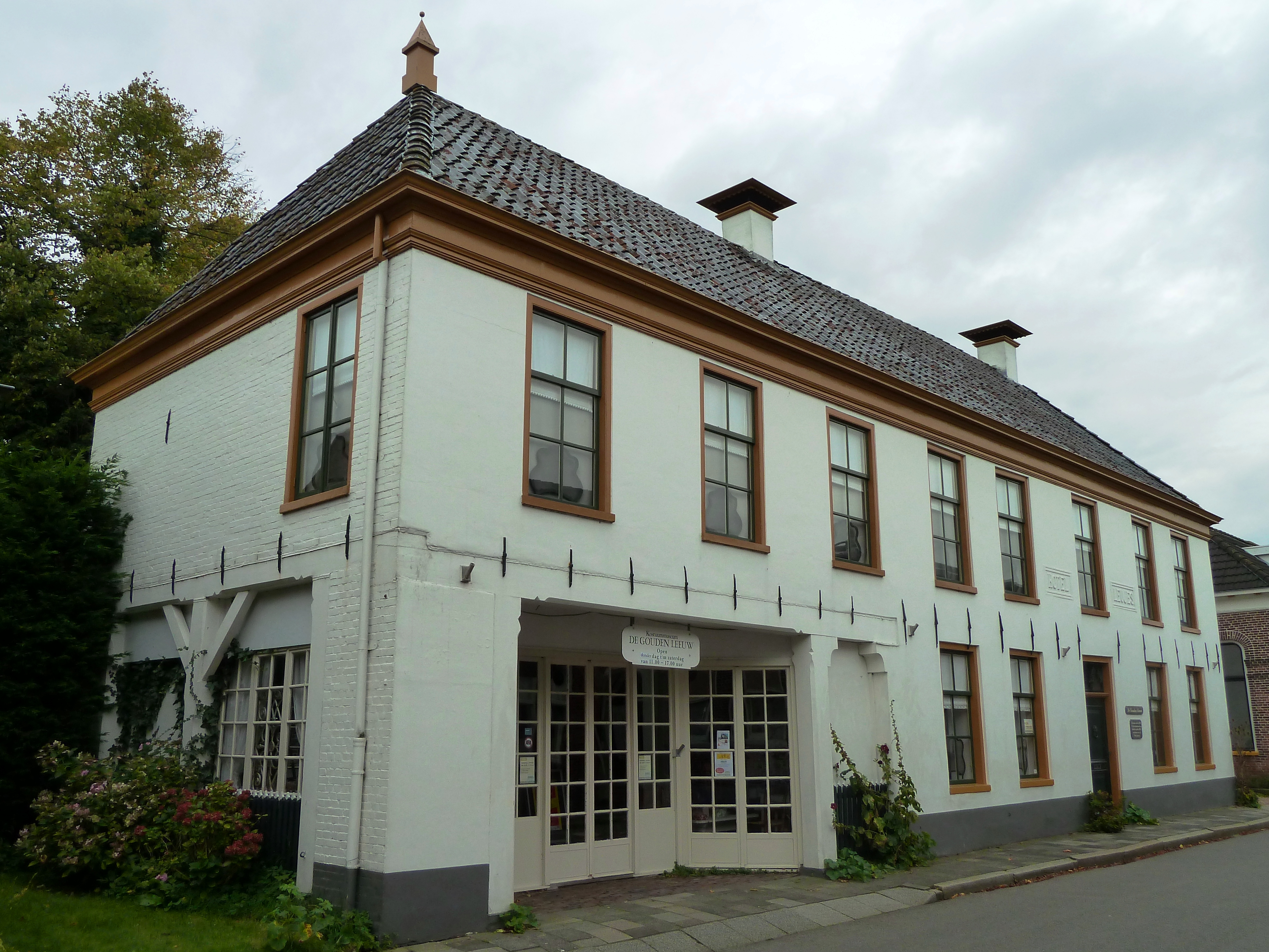
- Former inn De Gouden Leeuw (est. 1622)

- Location in province of Groningen in the Netherlands Noordhorn (Netherlands)
- Coordinates: 53.2582°N 6.3940°E
- Country: Netherlands
- Province: Groningen
- Municipality: Westerkwartier

Area
  - Total: 1.13 km^{2} (0.44 sq mi)
- Elevation: 2 m (6.6 ft)

Population (2021)
  - Total: 1,365
  - Density: 1,210/km^{2} (3,130/sq mi)
- Time zone: UTC+1 (CET)
  - Summer (DST): UTC+2 (CEST)
- Postal code: 9804
- Dialing code: 0594

Noordhorn (Gronings: Noordhörn) is a village in the Dutch province of Groningen. It is part of the municipality of Westerkwartier and is separated from Zuidhorn by the Van Starkenborgh Canal.

== History ==
Noordhorn is located on a sandy ridge. The settlement on the north side became known as Noordhorn and the southern village Zuidhorn. It was first mentioned in 1398 spelled as "Noirthoren". The church has 13th century elements, and was founded by the Aduard Abbey. The village was not part of a heerlijkheid or ruled by a lord.

In 1498, Nittert Fox, a Saxon knight, demanded a ransom of ƒ32,000 from the city of Groningen. The amount was not paid, and Fox burnt the villages of Noord- and Zuidhorn which resulted in Groningen giving into the demands.

During the Dutch Revolt, the city of Groningen sided with Spain. Most of the Ommelanden (country side) and the province of Friesland opted for the Dutch Republic, and an army advanced on the city. On 30 September 1581, the Battle of Noordhorn was fought which was won by Spain. On 22 July 1594, after the Siege of Groningen, Groningen was forced to side with Dutch Republic.

Noordhorn was traditionally considered part of Zuidhorn. In 1795, it had a population of 550 people. In 1808, during the French occupation, Noordhorn became the seat of a commune which included Zuidhorn. In 1814, it was reversed again.

In 1930s, the Van Starkenborgh Canal was dug which forms a physical separation between Noord- and Zuidhorn. The main road N355 used to pass through the village. The van Starkenborgh Canal had to be widened to accommodate for container ships with four layers which required a new bridge over the canal. As part of the reconstruction a tunnel was built through Noordhorn. The tunnel opened in 2014. In 2018, Noordhorn became part of the municipality of Westerkwartier.

== Notable people ==
- Albert Egges van Giffen (1884–1973), archaeologist
- Johan van der Meer (1913–2011), conductor and founder of the Groningse Bachvereniging

== Gallery ==
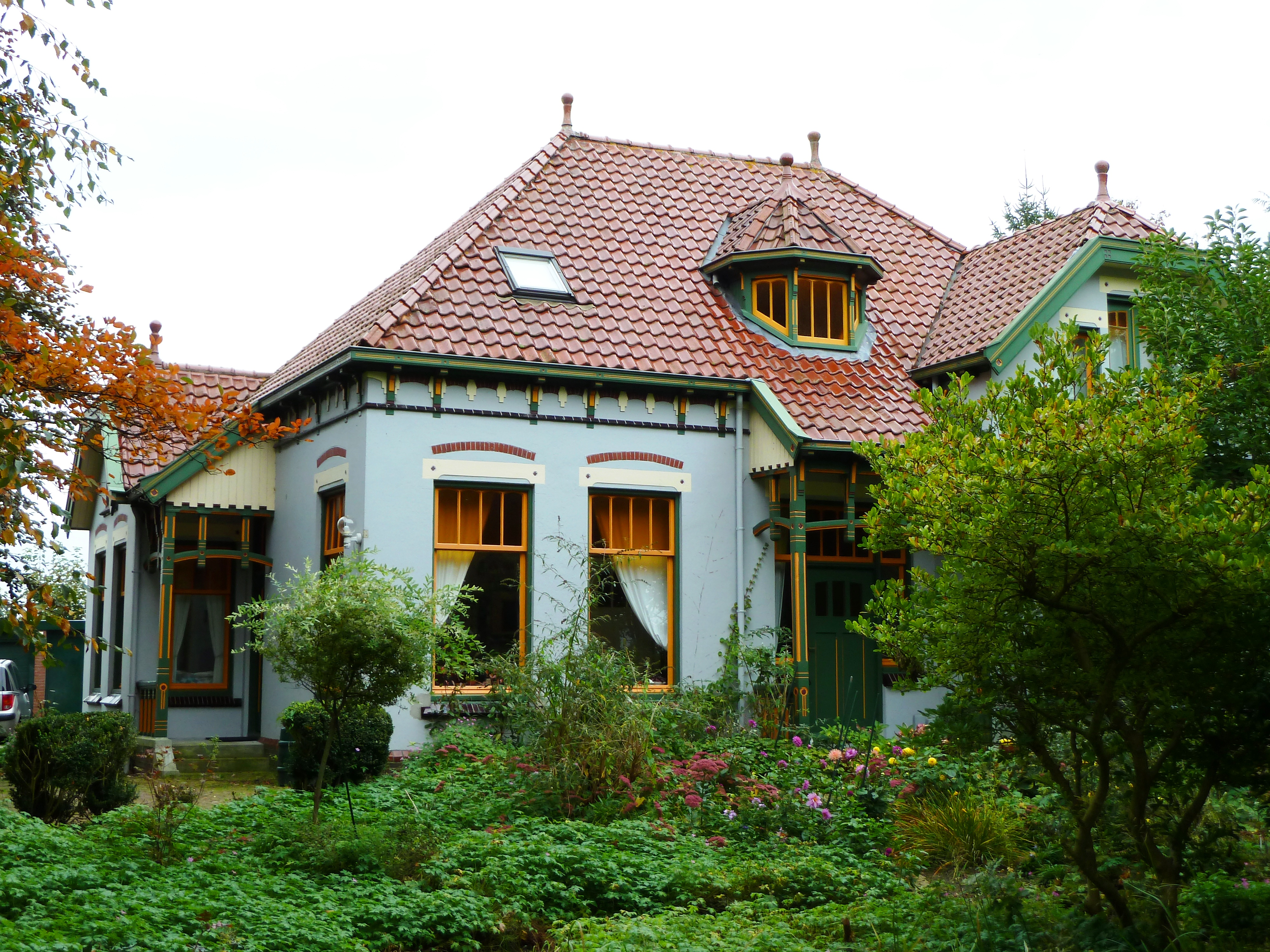
Langestraat 17

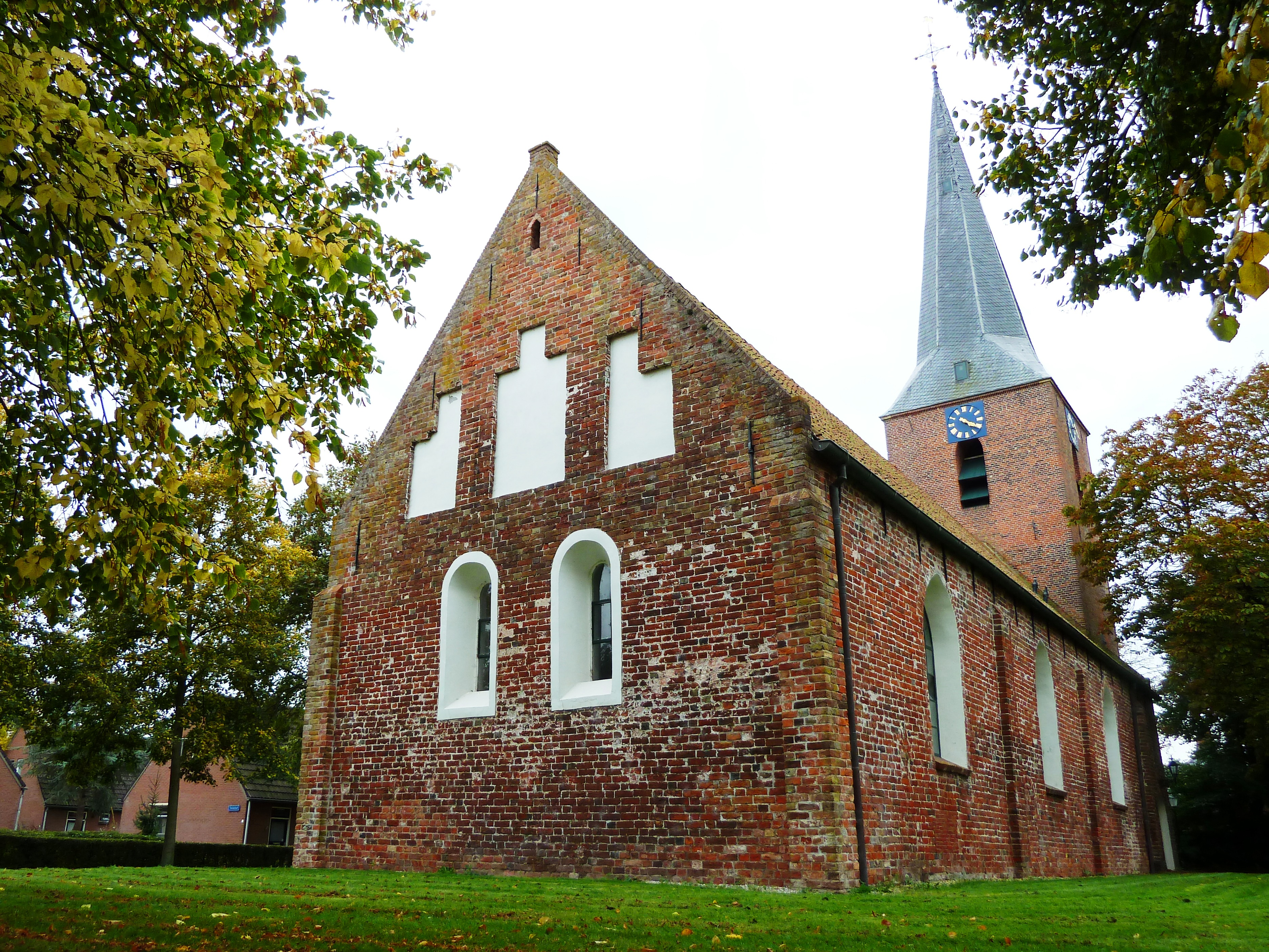
Dutch Reformed Church

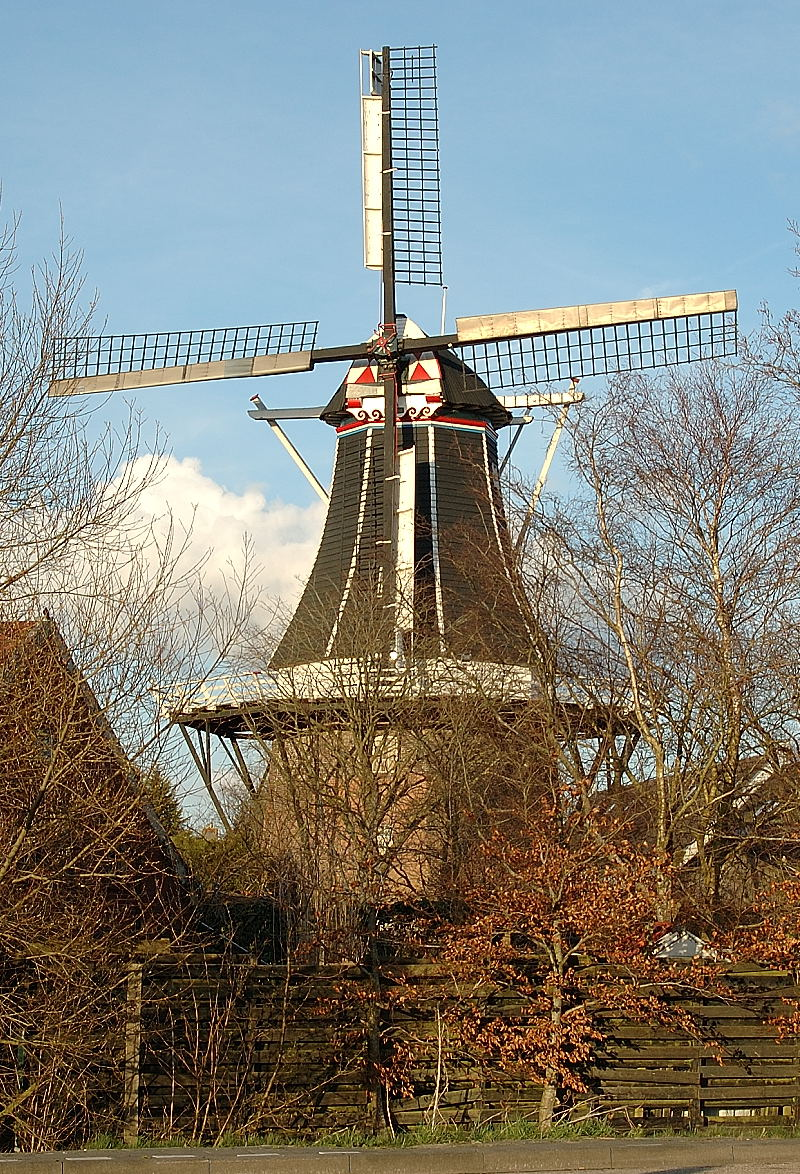
Windmill De Fortuin

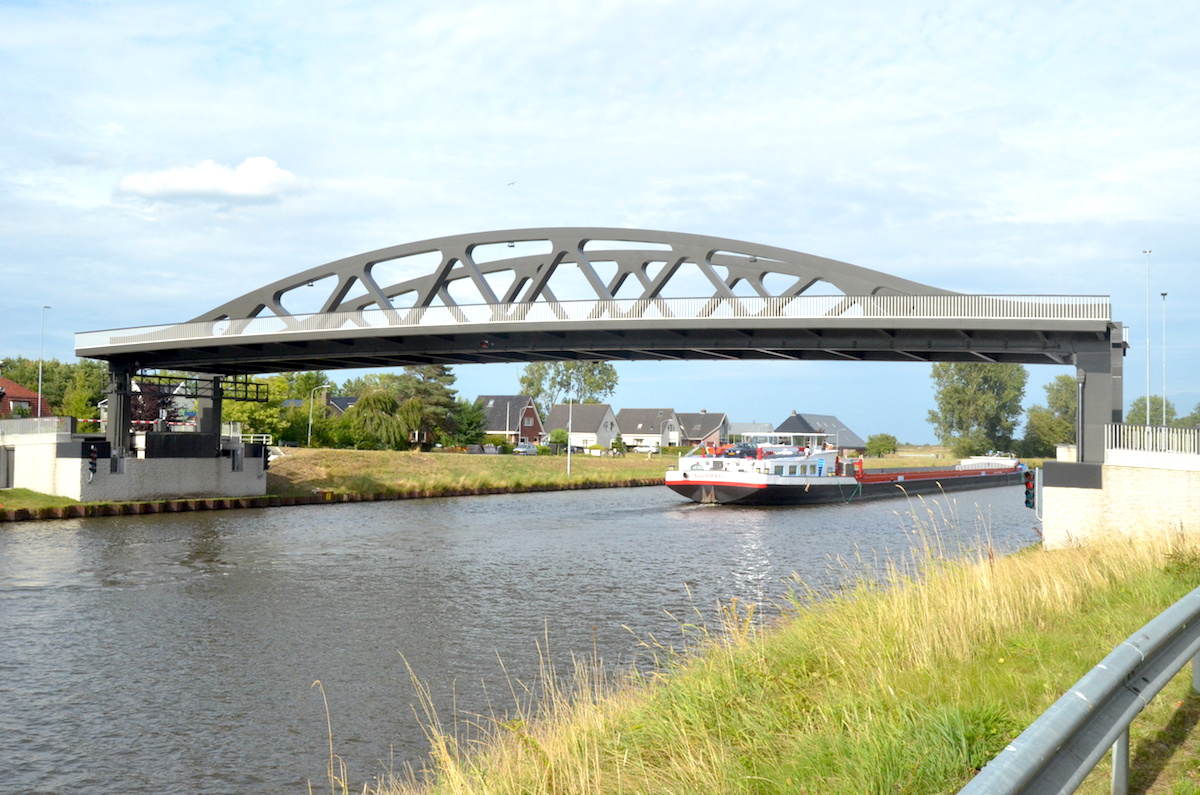
Vertical-lift bridge between Noordhorn (left) and Zuidhorn (right) (2018)
