= Solynta =

Dutch biotechnology company

- Type: Private
- Industry: Biotechnology
- Founded: 2006
- Founder: Hein Kruyt, Pim Lindhout, Theo Schotte, and Johan Trouw
- Headquarters: Wageningen, Netherlands
- Website: www.solynta.com

Solynta is a Dutch biotechnology company that specializes in hybrid potato breeding. Its headquarters is located in Wageningen, Gelderland, the Netherlands.

== Overview ==
Solynta was founded by Hein Kruyt, Pim Lindhout, Theo Schotte and Johan Trouw in 2006. Solynta has been focusing on developing potato hybrids through breeding.

In 2026 EW Group became the majority owner of the company.

== Technology ==
Hybrid breeding allows a breeder to combine in an easy way favorable traits from one parental line A with other desired traits from parental line B in its F1 offspring. This requires potato plants which are self-compatible and diploid, that can be used to generate the parental lines. To this end, Solynta crossed in 2008 a diploid potato with Solanum chacoense to start hybrid breeding.

The first step is to develop parental lines that are homozygous. Although potato is very heterozygous, it is possible to generate homozygous potato lines.

Self-compatible diploid potato was found by Hosaka and Hanneman in the Solanum chacoense used by Solynta. The first results of the breeding efforts were published in 2011 by Lindhout et al., a few years later this potential of hybrid breeding in potato was acknowledged by the US scientific community. Further tails of the breeding process, including the original donors have been described in Lindhout et al., 2018. The mechanisms of self-compatibility in potato have recently been unraveled simultaneously by Eggers et al. and Ma et al., identifying the Sli-gene.

Meijer et al. (2018) and Prinzenberg et al. (2018) showed that using the potato breeding material of Solynta, fast and targeted progress on breeding for specific traits could be achieved. In 2017, Solynta showed in a program called HiSPoB that it was able to introduce a double stack phytophthora resistance in their hybrid material, which was publicly demonstrated (Su et al. 2020). With this demonstration the principle of marker-assisted breeding, known and applied in other major crops, was demonstrated for the first time for potato. Solynta's potato breeding techniques include F1 hybrid potato breeding.

== Research collaborations ==
Solynta has participated in a number of scientific collaborations and networks in order to gain experience with the technology and to allow public researchers to work with genetic material made available by Solynta.

- SolAce: methods for improving agroecosystem and crop efficiency for water and nutrient use
- Protecta: pathogen-informed resistance to oomycete diseases in ecosystems, agriculture and aquaculture
- Sky High: vertical farming program
- Responsible Innovation in Dutch Potato Breeding (NWO Responsible Innovation)
- Holland Innovative Potato (HIP)

For public research purposes, the diploid self-compatible line "Solyntus" was released to the scientific community in collaboration with Wageningen UR – Plant Breeding. Genetic material from Solynta was used by groups in the UK and Sweden to perform research on fundamental aspects of potato biology. The collaborations have led to an acknowledgment by the public scientific community for the openness and transparency of Solynta.

The Sli gene was recently cloned by Wageningen University and Solynta in 2021, which will allow for faster and more focused breeding. It primarily focuses on Hybrid True Potato Seeds (HTPS) that are not genetically modified. Using potato seeds, 25 grams of seeds can be utilized in place of 2500 kg of tubers as used in traditional potato planting. This method of potato breeding received a U.S. patent in 2020.

Solynta has worked on developing on a late blight-resistant potato variety using cross-breeding. Scientists at the company have also worked on published genome sequences of potatoes.

== Impact and further research ==
Two patents have been granted on hybrid breeding technology, one in the US in 2020. Solynta signed a collaboration with the largest potato starch processor, AVEBE in 2021. Their joint goal is to develop hybrid potato varieties with added value for processing starch and other ingredients, while maintaining a sustainable crop production.

First variety registrations were obtained in Zimbabwe (2021) and Kenya (2023). A collaboration agreement with seed-treatment specialist Incotec was signed in 2022.

The case of hybrid potato breeding has led to a number of studies, initiated by Rathenau Institute (Beumer & Edelenbosch, 2019; Edelenbosch & Munnichs, 2020).

Solynta's model of using and regulating ownership of newly developed technologies is discussed in Beumer et al.'s framework of Commons. The framework states there is a diversity of genetic material available and accessible and supports a scientific basis for further development of the potato value chain.

Potato hybrid breeding trials have been carried out in the DR Congo (in Ituri Province), Rwanda, and Mozambique (in Angónia District, Tete Province). An early hybrid potato growing trial using diploid hybrids in East Africa showed promising yield and disease resistance.
