= Loenen, Apeldoorn =

Loenen
- Village
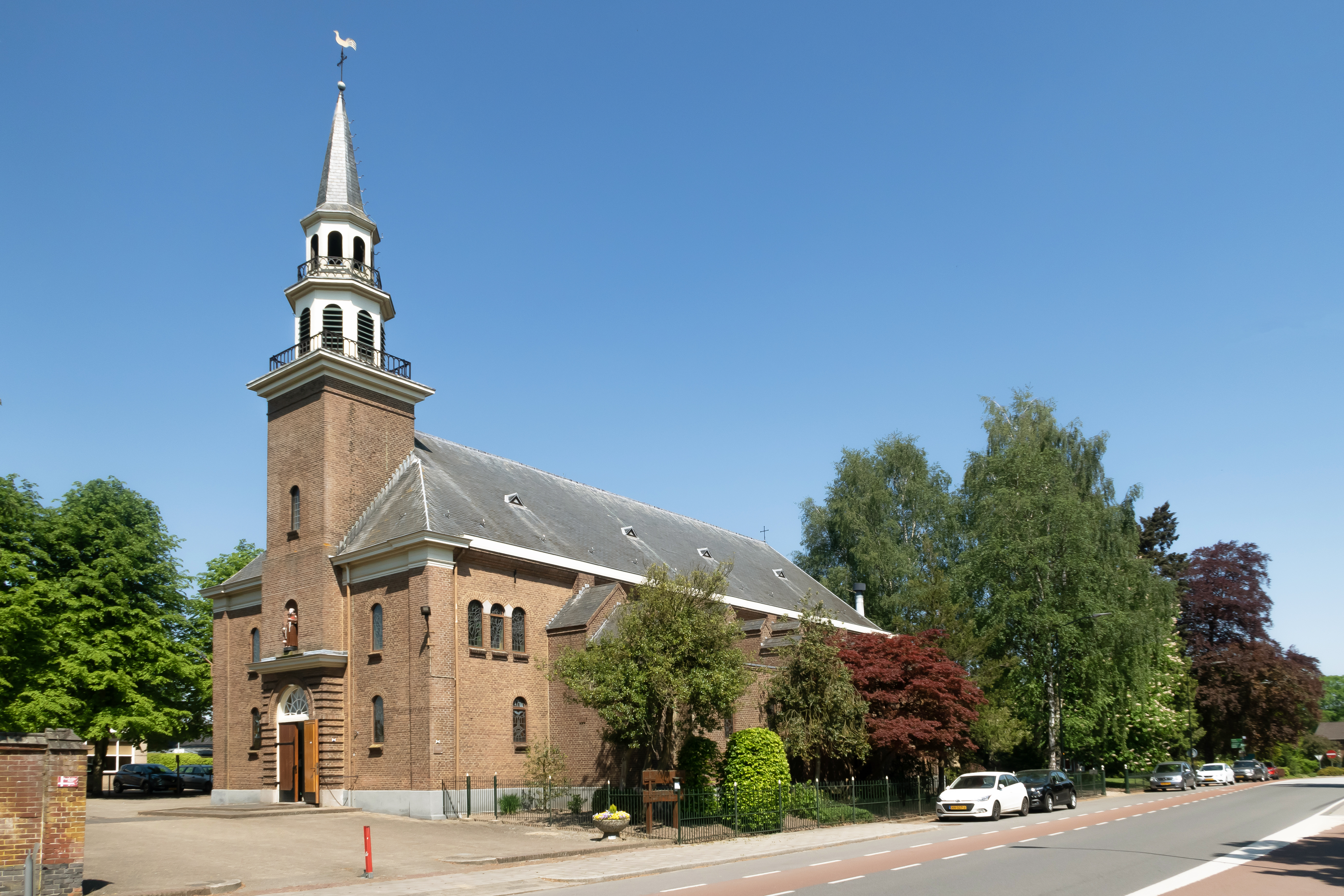
- Loenen, catholic church

- Location of Loenen in the municipality of Apeldoorn (the urban area of Loenen is red and the rural area is pink)

- Location of Loenen in Gelderland Loenen (Netherlands)
- Coordinates: 52°6′59″N 6°1′8″E
- Country: Netherlands
- Province: Gelderland
- Municipality: Apeldoorn

Area
  - Village: 36.9 km^{2} (14.2 sq mi)
  - Urban: 1.2 km^{2} (0.46 sq mi)
- Elevation: 25 m (82 ft)

Population (1 January 2015)
  - Village: 3,066
  - Density: 83.1/km^{2} (215/sq mi)
  - Urban: 2,116
- Time zone: UTC+1 (CET)
  - Summer (DST): UTC+2 (CEST)
- Postcodes: 7370 and 7371
- Area code: 055

Loenen is a village in the Dutch province of Gelderland. It is located in the municipality of Apeldoorn, about 10 km southeast of that city.

Loenen was a separate municipality until 1818, when it was merged with Apeldoorn.

== National Cemetery of Honours ==
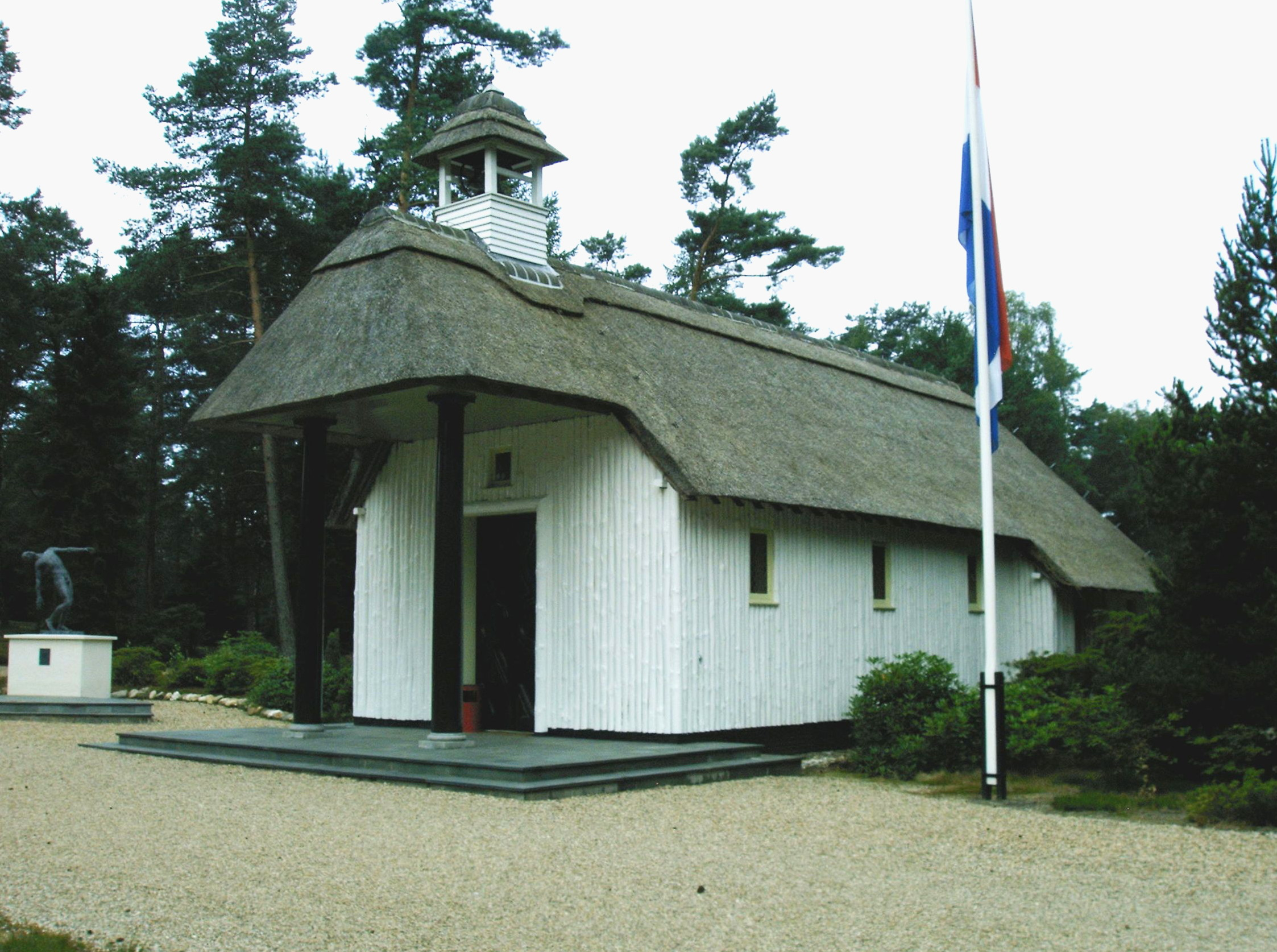
Chapel at Loenen

Near the village of Loenen is the National Cemetery of Honours (Nationaal Ereveld Loenen), In 1948, it was decided to create a national cemetery of honours for the resistance fighters, political prisoners, and soldiers who died during World War II and were buried outside of the Netherlands. There are close to 4,000 people buried at the cemetery

In the centre is a chapel dedicated to the Engelandvaarders, the men and women who attempted to escape from the Netherlands to England, and a funerary urn containing earth from the concentration camps Majdanek, Sobibor and Treblinka. In the back is the list of the 130,000 people whose remains have not been located.

== Notable people ==
- Willem Albert Scholten (1819–1895), industrialist and landowner
