= Willem Albert Scholten =

Dutch industrialist

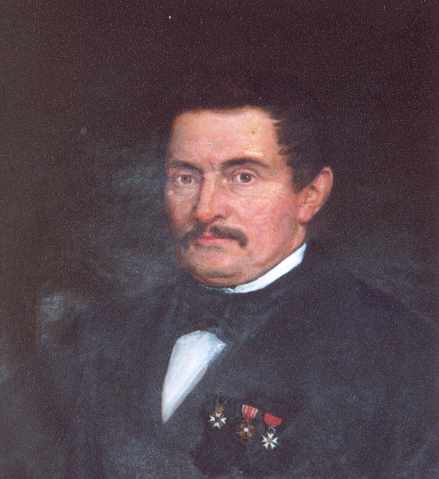
- Born: 6 October 1819; Loenen, Netherlands
- Died: 1 May 1892 (aged 72); Groningen, Netherlands
- Occupation(s): industrialist, landowner
- Known for: Eureka, Scholtenhuis, Holland America Line
- Spouse: Klaassien Sluis

Willem Albert Scholten (6 October 1819 – 1 May 1895) was a Dutch industrialist and landowner. He established the potato starch factory Eureka in Foxhol which laid the foundation of an industrial empire. Scholten would own 24 factories in Europe. He owned large plots of land in Drenthe for peat extraction, and was one of the founders of what would become the Holland America Line. In Groningen, Scholten built the Scholtenhuis, a large residential house on the Grote Markt, the main square, opposite the City Hall.

== Biography ==
Scholten was born on 6 October 1819 in Loenen. His father was a minister, but his grandfather was a rich farmer. He went to school until the age of 14. In 1836, he worked at a paint factory in Amsterdam, and wanted to establish his own factory. He went to Germany to learn about the industry, and discovered that they used potato starch in their dyes. Scholten became fascinated with the numerous potential uses of starch. Potato starch factories already existed. The earliest was built in Gouda in 1819, however all were small and limited to a specific purpose. In 1837, at the age of 17 he started experimenting at his uncle's farm, and in 1839 built a factory in Warnsveld which burned down in 1840.

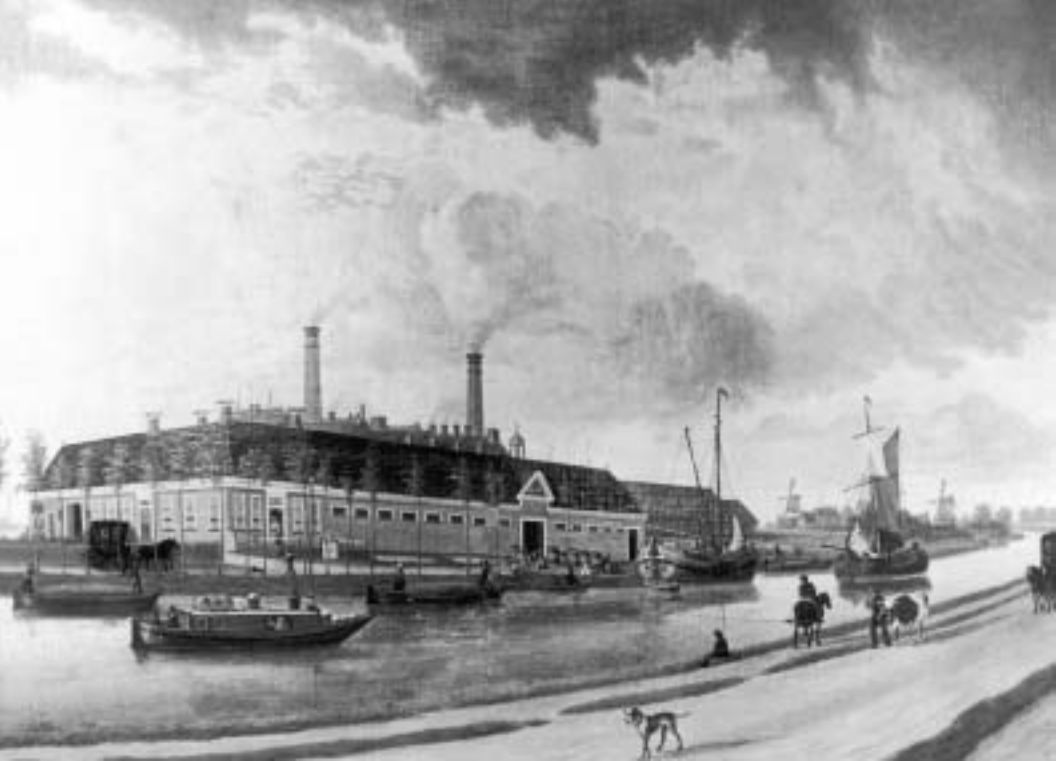
Painting of Eureka (c. 1868)

Scholten discovered that the main problem was the transportation costs of the potatoes. He had become engaged with Klaassien Sluis, the daughter of rich grain merchant from Groningen. Using a loan from his future father-in-law, Scholten started a factory in Foxhol, because it was close to the potato fields, near a lake with clean water, and well connected to the outside world. In 1842, the Eureka factory opened, and was very successful. He married Klaassien Sluis on 18 September 1847. Klaassien was in charge of accounting and would remain the head of the finance department until 1892.

Scholten would continue to expand his empire, and opened a potato syrup factory in Hoogezand, a jenever factory in Sappemeer, a potato sago factory in Zuidbroek. In 1849, he exported to Manchester and Glasgow, however the profits were low due to transport costs and tariffs. In 1866, he crossed the border to build a factory in Hakenberg, Brandenburg, Germany, and would continue into Austria-Hungary, and Congress Poland. The decision to open factories in other countries was mainly based on lower wages and the elimination of tariffs.

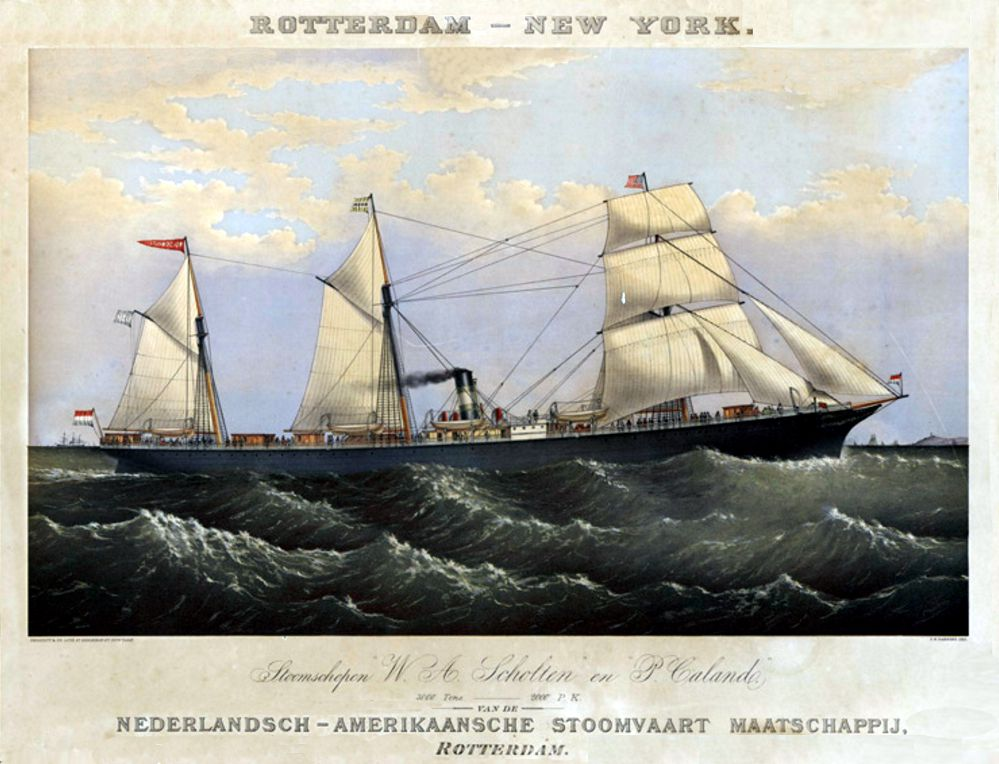
Advertisement for the Nederlandsch Amerikaansche Stoomvaart Mij

Scholten was one of the founders and the largest stockholder of the Nederlandsch-Amerikaansche Stoomvaart-Maatschappij which became later known as the Holland America Line. SS W. A. Scholten, one of the passenger ships, bore his name. In 1879, after disappointing results, he resigned from the company claiming that he was too old. However, he did invest in other shipping lines.

In 1873, he was asked to participate in a 756 hectares (1,870 acres) peat exploitation project in Emmer-Compascuum in Drenthe. He would end up acquiring the 974 hectares (2,410 acres) Smeulveen, and the 1,000 hectares (2,500 acres) Barger-Oosterveen. In 1903, his son Jan Evert renamed Smeulveen and the village its contained Klazienaveen after his mother. It is one of the two villages in the Netherlands named after a non-royal woman.

In 1882, Scholten built a residential home on the Grote Markt, the main square, opposite the City Hall. In 1883, he received a telephone connection free of charge for one year to try it out. By 1887 all his factories were connected in order to keep personal contact. On 6 October 1889, his 70th birthday, he donated a children's hospital to the city of Groningen.

Scholten died on 1 May 1895 in Groningen, at the age of 75. He was buried in a monument in Zuiderbegraafplaats.

== Scholtenhuis ==
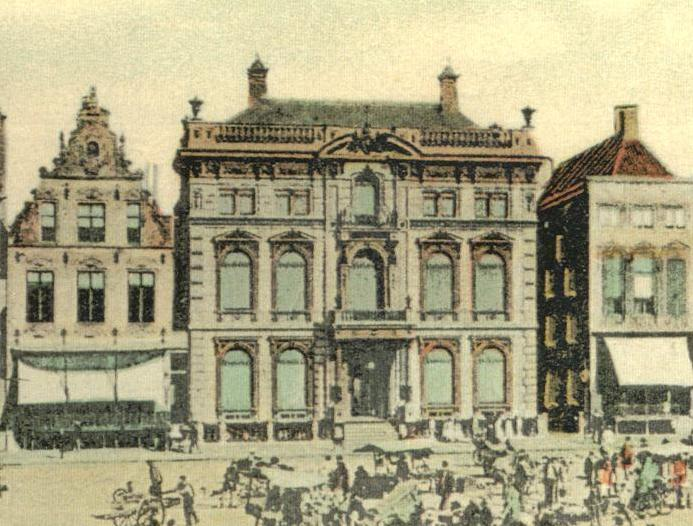
Scholtenhuis

In 1872, Scholten had built Villa Gelria as his residential home on the outskirts of Groningen, however he preferred a more central location befitting a man of his stature. Three houses on the Grote Markt caught his eye, however the residents refused to sell their houses. The owners were elderly, and Scholten patiently waited for their deaths, and acquired the houses from their heirs. In 1879, the three houses were demolished, and construction started of the Scholtenhuis which was completed in 1881. It was located directly opposite the City Hall.

The Scholtenhuis would remain in the family. One month after the German invasion of the Netherlands, the widow of his son Jan Evert Scholten, was removed from the building, because the Sicherheitsdienst (SD), the security service of the SS, had expropriated the Scholtenhuis as the headquarters for the Province of Groningen. The SD under the command of Ernst Knorr used the building for interrogation and torture, and the building became infamous. On 13 April 1945, Canadian troops neared the city of Groningen. The staff of the SD fled to Schiermonnikoog, an island, and set the Scholtenhuis on fire. The building was later demolished.

== Honours ==
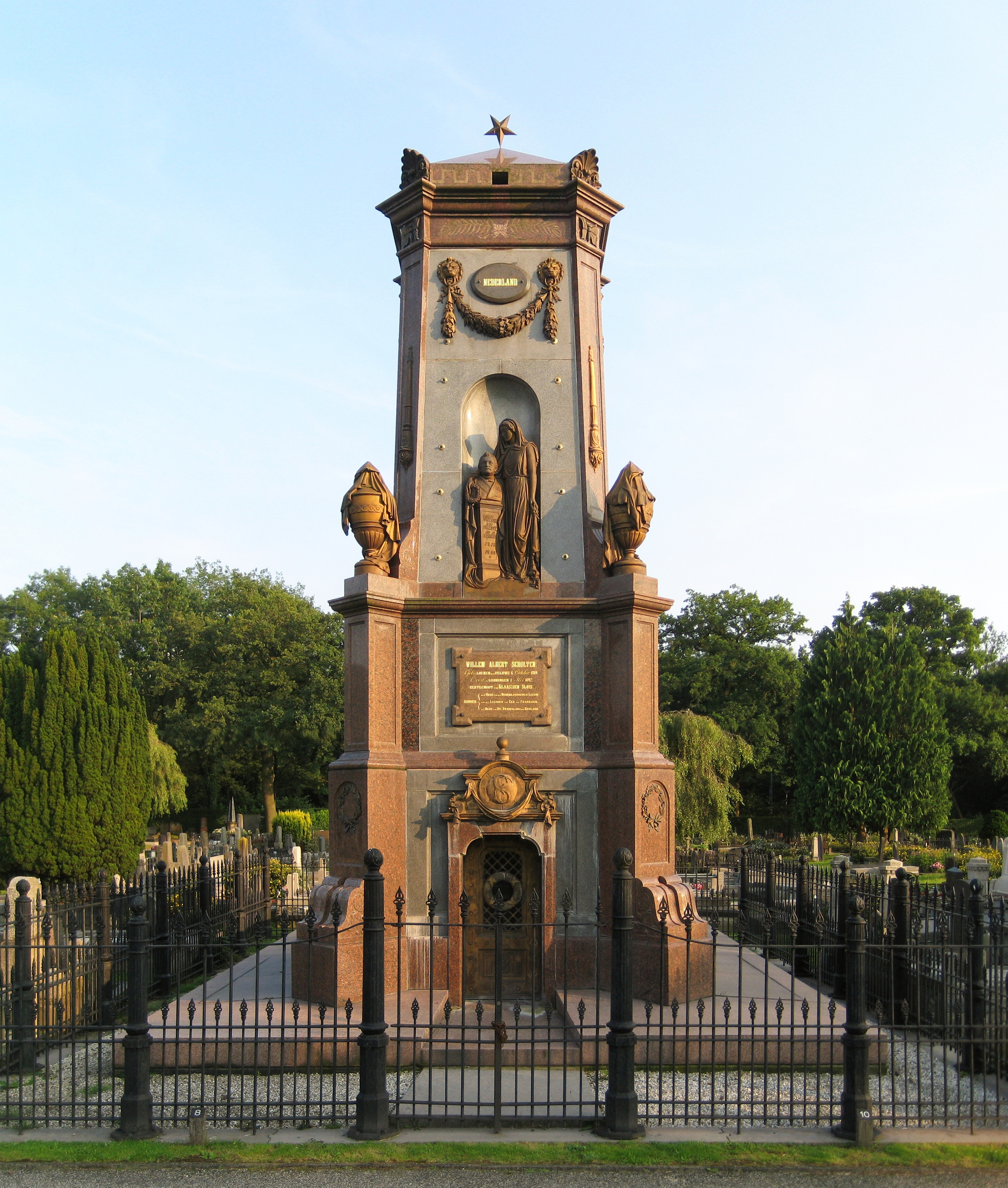
Grave of Scholten in Zuiderbegraafplaats

- Netherlands Knight of the Order of the Netherlands Lion
- France Knight of the Legion of Honour
- Russia Knight of the Order of Saint Stanislaus

== See also ==
- Avebe

== Bibliography ==
- Knaap, Dorien Aletta (2004). 'Voor geld is altijd wel een plaats te vinden' : de firma W.A. Scholten (1841-1892), de eerste Nederlandse industriële multinational (PDF) (Thesis) (in Dutch). Assen: Van Gorcum.
