= Royal Avebe =

German-Dutch Agricultural Cooperative

Coordinates: 53.10675°N 6.87130°E

Royal Avebe U.A.
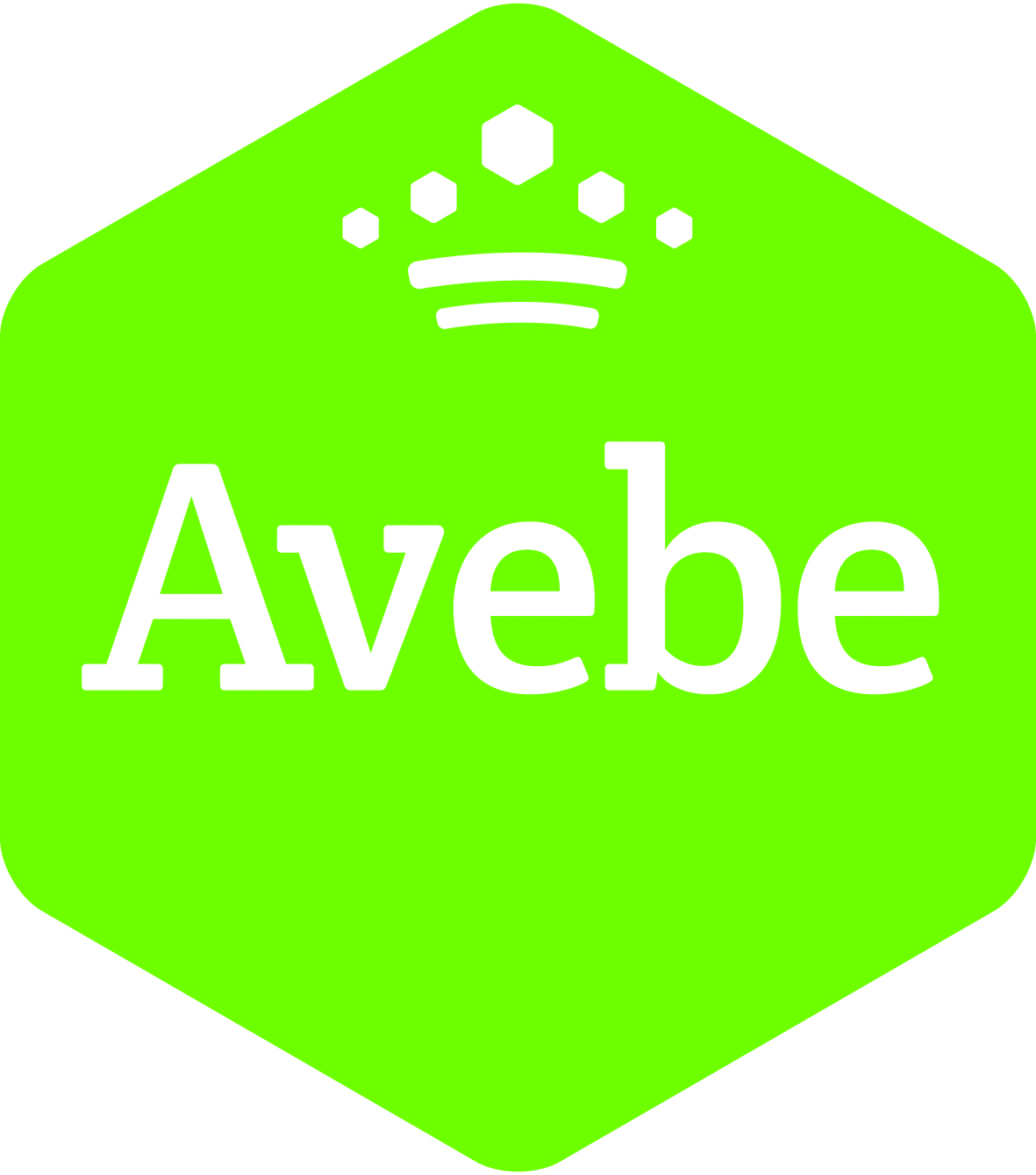

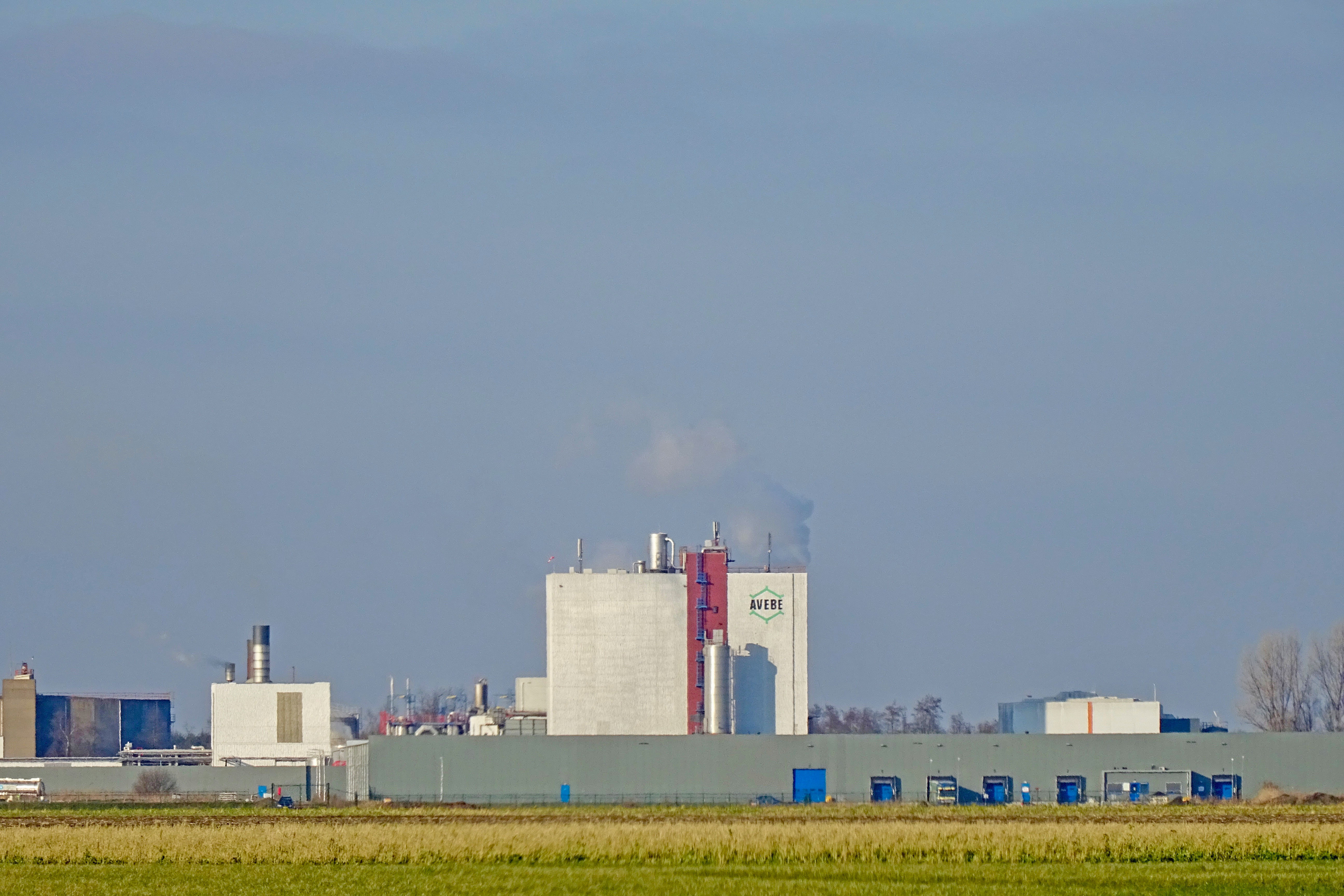
- Factory at Gasselternijveen, Netherlands
- Type: Cooperative
- Industry: Agriculture
- Founded: 1919
- Headquarters: Veendam, Netherlands
- Key people: David Fousert (CEO), Rob van Laerhoven (CFO)
- Products: Starch, starch derivatives, protein
- Revenue: € 780 million (2023-2024)
- Number of employees: 1,254 (2024)
- Website: avebe.com

The cooperative Royal Avebe U.A. (abbreviation of Aardappelmeel Verkoop Bureau) is an international Dutch starch manufacturer located in the north of the Netherlands and produces starch products based on potato starch and potato protein for use in food, animal feed, paper, construction, textiles and adhesives.

About 2000 farmers are members of Avebe. The cooperation is divided into six districts (two in Germany and four in the Netherlands). Avebe starch factories in the Netherlands, Germany and Sweden processes about 3 million tons in potatoes.

== History ==
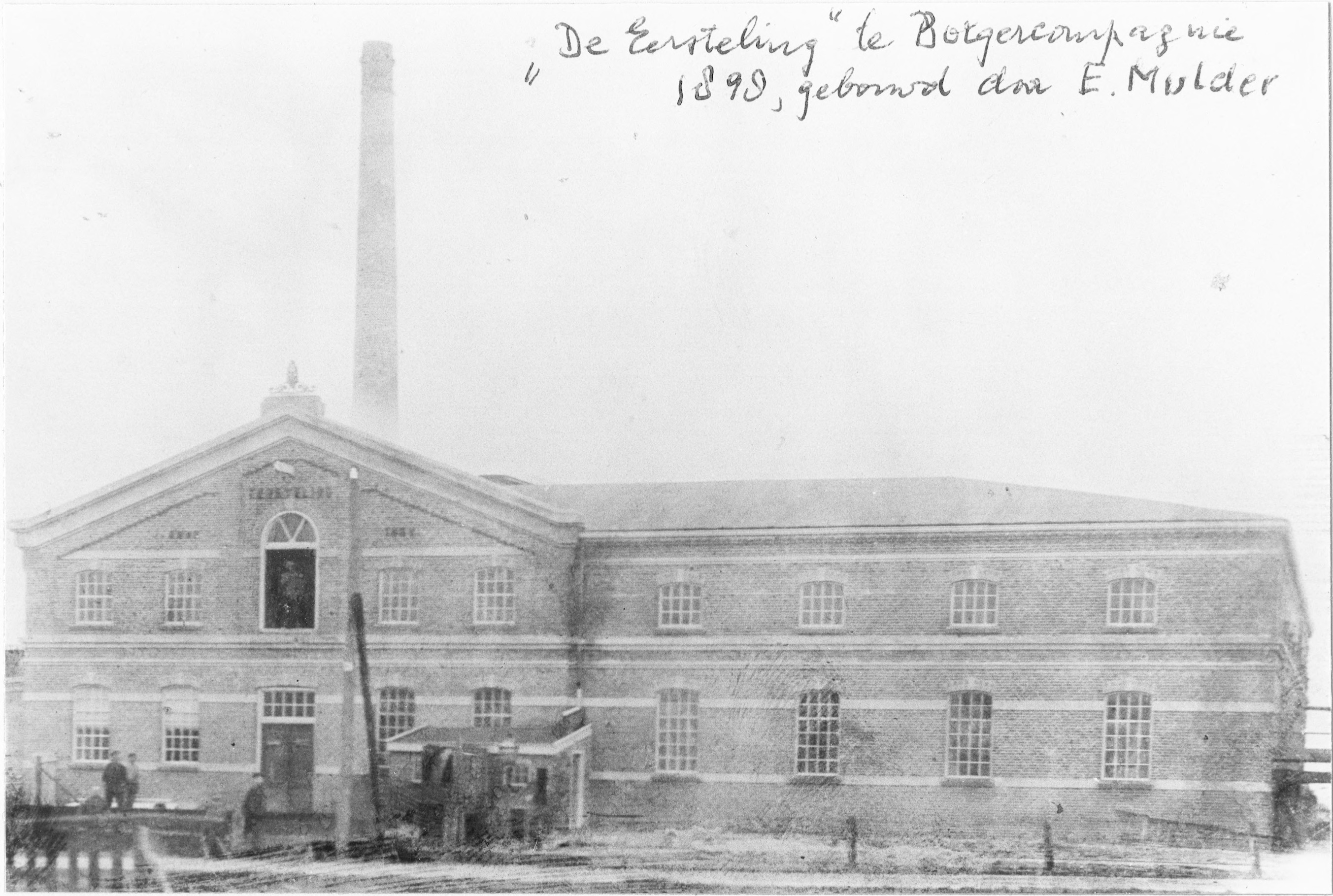
the first farmers potato starch factory coöperative in Groningen: "De Eersteling" (1898-1935), 1908

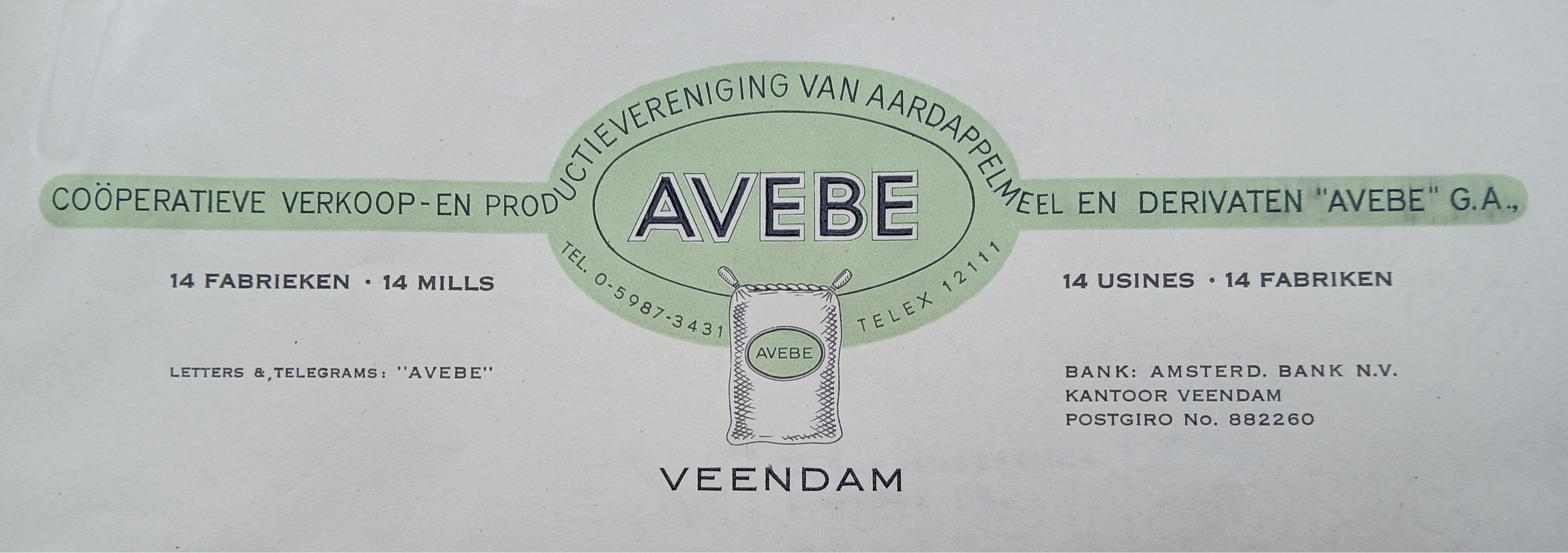
Avebe logo on letter paper 1966

The history of Avebe is strongly connected with the history of the Dutch province Groningen, the many privately owned starch manufacturers in the area and the former starch company KSH (Royal Scholten-Honig) founded by Willem Albert Scholten in 1841, the first Dutch multinational.

The name Avebe is derived from the Dutch words Aardappelmeel Verkoop Bureau (Potato Flour Sales Office). The cooperative was founded in 1919 as a cooperative partnership between different potato starch manufacturers located in Groningen owned by potato farmers to ensure good market prices for their native starch. The farmer cooperatives successfully pushed the privately owned starch companies away from native starch into the production of starch derivatives. In 1948, the cooperation evolved into one company and was renamed as Avebe. In 1956, the first derivatives were produced. In 1978, after the bankruptcy of KSH, further integration of the potato starch industry in Groningen was finalized as Avebe took over a large part of the Scholten company. KSH was the last privately owned potato starch company in the Netherlands.

Today, Avebe is now the largest producer of potato starch and potato starch derivatives worldwide.

== Recent developments ==
After further expanding the potato starch business in the 1980s and 90s, in Germany and also expanding to other starch sources such as wheat and tapioca, the Avebe farmers cooperative has reorganized its activities and since 2006, again specialises in the potato crop. Since 2005, Avebe produces a GMO-free amylopectin waxy potato starch (Eliane) and is investing in a new refining technique to produce native potato protein (Solanic) for food applications.

In 2021, Royal Avebe announced that it would be collaborating with Solynta, a Dutch agritech company, on developing hybrid breeding for starch potato varieties.
