= Albert Egges van Giffen =

Dutch archaeologist

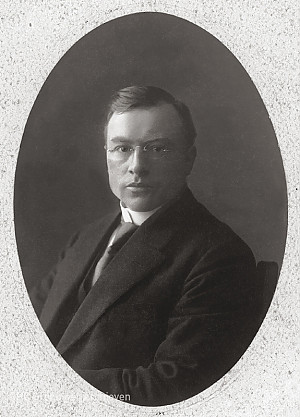
- A photo of Van Giffen (ca. 1935)
- Born: 14 March 1884; Noordhorn, Netherlands
- Died: 31 May 1973 (aged 89)
- Education: University of Groningen
- Scientific career
- Fields: Archaeology
- Workplaces: University of Groningen, University of Amsterdam

Albert Egges van Giffen (14 March 1884 – 31 May 1973) was a Dutch archaeologist. Van Giffen worked at the University of Groningen and University of Amsterdam, where he was a professor of Prehistory and Germanic archaeology. He worked most of his career in the Northern provinces of the Netherlands, where he specialized in hunebeds and tumuli.

== Career ==
Van Giffen was born on 14 March 1884 in Noordhorn to Jan van Giffen, a predikant, and Hendrika Post. He attended the gymnasium in Zutphen and Sneek. Van Giffen studied zoology and biology at the University of Groningen between 1904 and 1910. He obtained his doctorate there in 1913 with a German-language thesis titled: "Die Fauna der Wurten" under supervision of J.F. van Bemmelen. Van Giffen was employed as curator at the Rijksmuseum van Oudheden in Leiden from 1912 to 1917. He then moved back to Groningen to work at the zoological laboratory.

Van Giffen was employed by the University of Groningen as lector Prehistory and Germanic Archaeology from 1930 to 1939, in that latter year he was appointed extraordinary professor. This was followed by a full professorship in 1943. Van Giffen also was an extraordinary professor at the University of Amsterdam from 1941 to 1943 and from 1946 until 1954, when he retired.

Upon his retirement Van Giffen was named State advisor for the conservation and preservation of hunebeds and restored archaeological monuments.

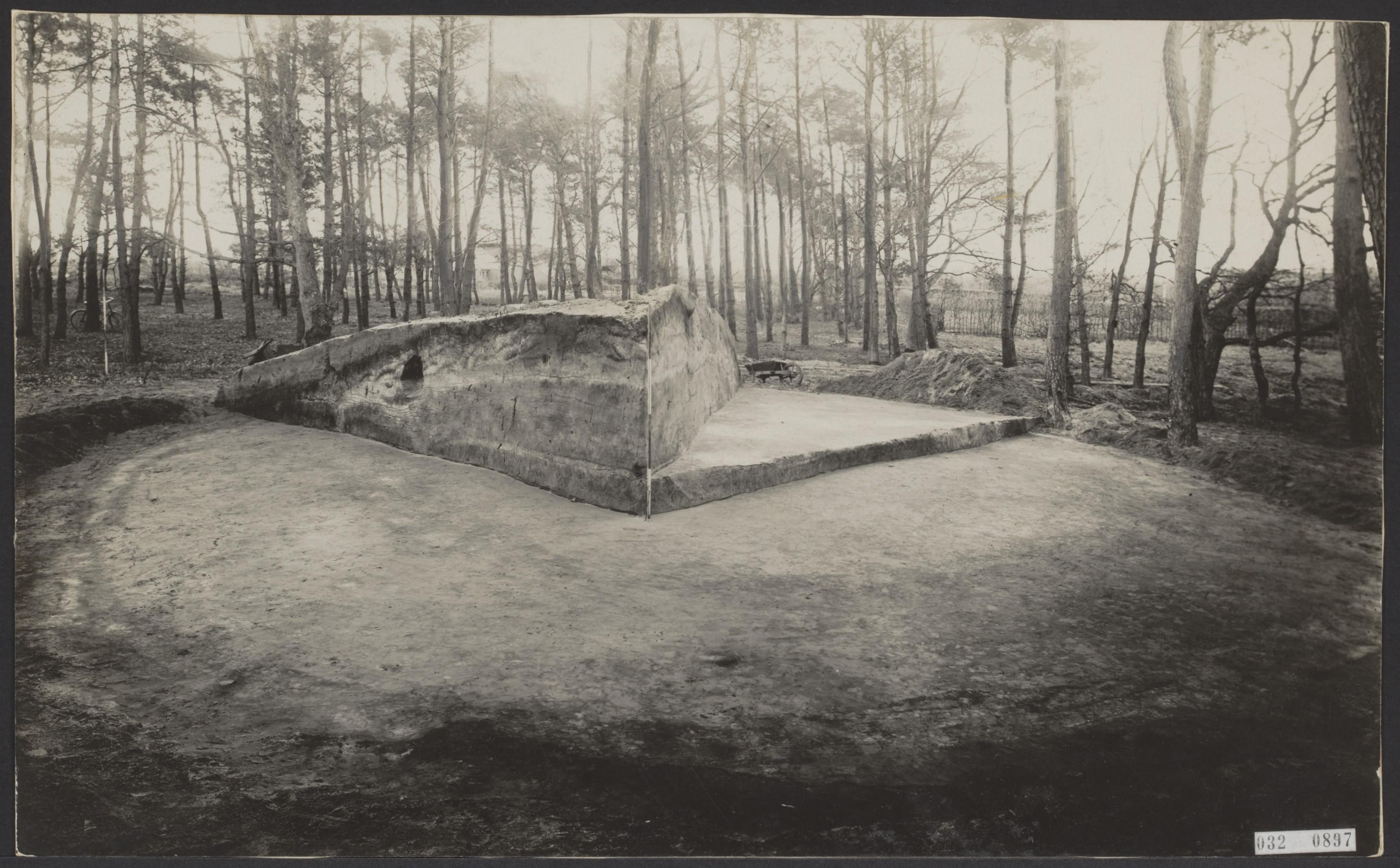
Dwelling hill, exvacated by Van Giffen (1927)

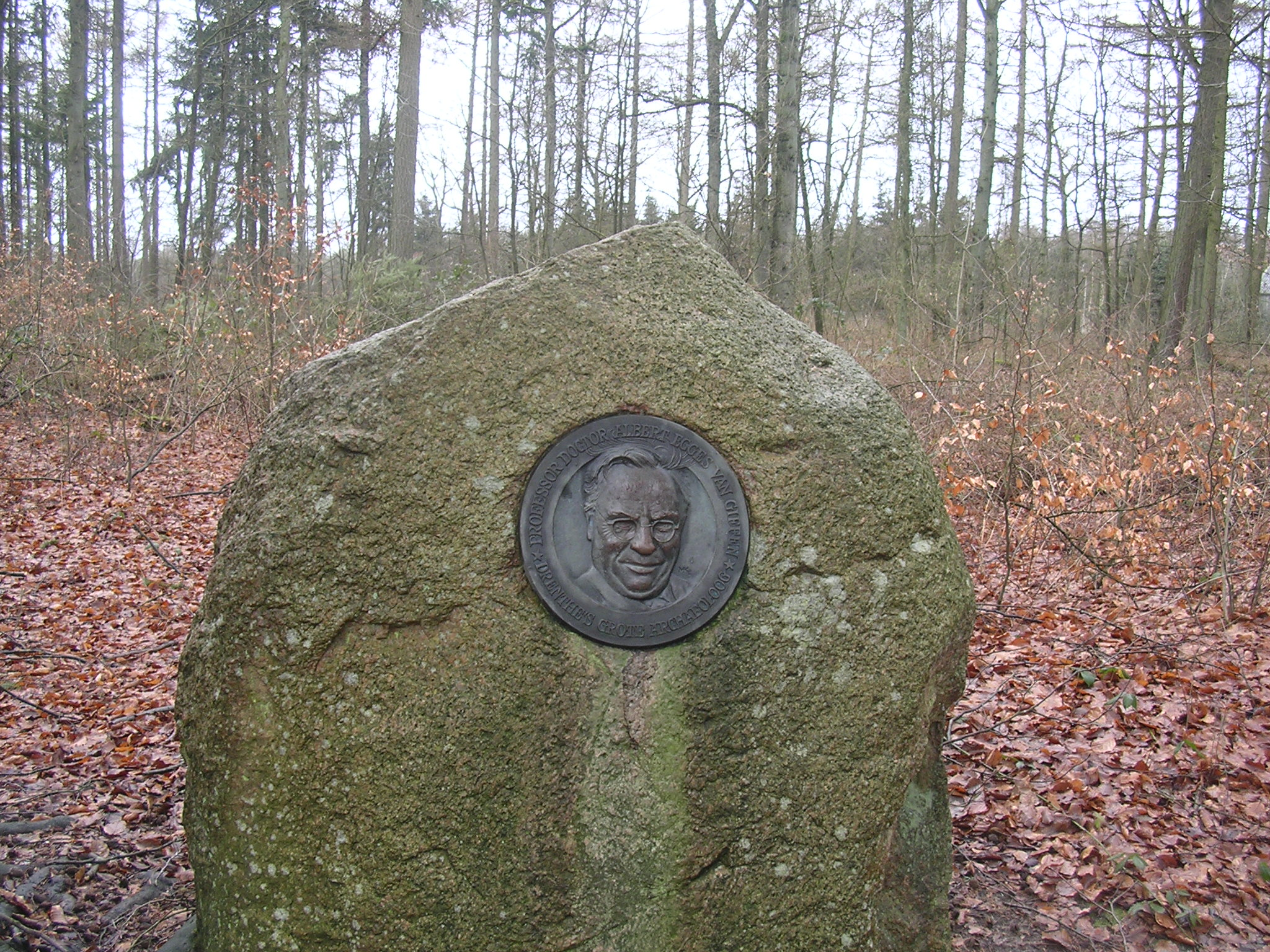
Memorial plaque

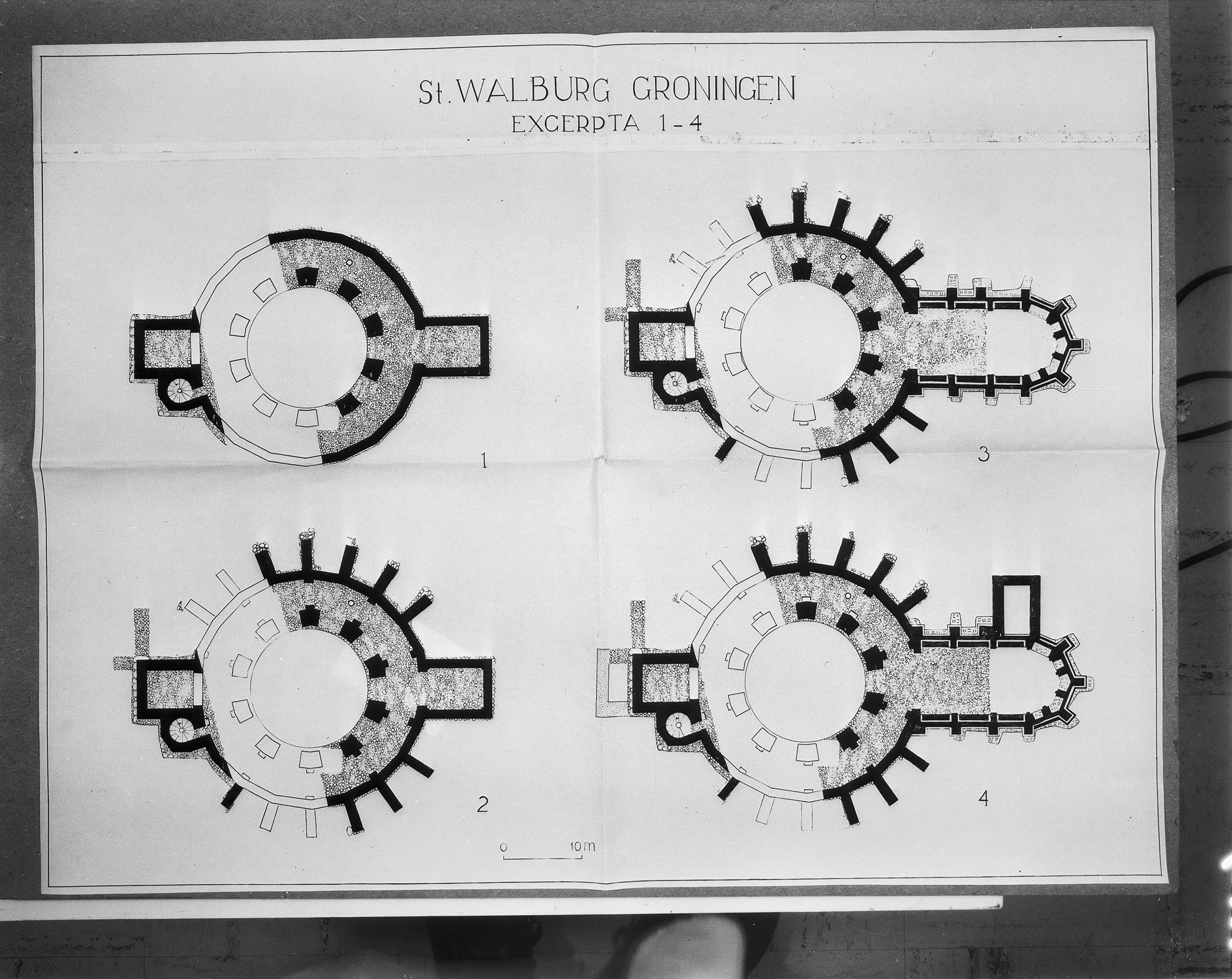
Drawing by Van Giffen

== Research ==
Van Giffen spend most of his career in the Northern provinces of Drenthe, Friesland and Groningen. Part of his work focused on hunebeds, tumuli and Wierde (landvorm). He was one of the main researchers at the site of Ezinge. Van Giffen also performed archaeological digs in the city centres of Amsterdam and Groningen.

Van Giffen became a member of the Royal Netherlands Academy of Arts and Sciences in 1932.

His collection was donated to the University of Groningen.

== Personal life ==
Van Giffen married Klaziena Geertruida Homan in 1911, the couple had two sons and two daughters before divorcing in July 1938. Half a year later Van Giffen married Guda Erica Gerharda Duijvis, with whom he had no further children.

Van Giffen died on 31 March 1973 in Zwolle.
