= Target (project) =

Research project in the Netherlands

- Location: University of Groningen, Netherlands
- Established: January 2009
- Funding: Funded by the European Fund for Regional Development & partners
- Website: rug.nl/target

Target is the name of a collaborative research project specialising in big data processing and management in northern Netherlands. It is a public-private cooperation, initiated in 2009 and supported by government subsidies. It is run by a consortium of ten academic and computer industry partners, coordinated by the University of Groningen, and researches data management of science projects in the areas of astronomy, life sciences, artificial intelligence and medical diagnosis.

Cooperating in the Target project are various divisions of the University of Groningen, its medical center, IBM, Oracle, ASTRON and Dutch IT firms Elkoog/Heeii and Nspyre.

Target's computer center is hosted by the Center for Information Technology, the computing center of the University of Groningen, and consist of more than 10 petabytes of storage based on IBM's GPFS storage technology, a high-performance computing cluster and a grid cluster, which is a part of the European Grid Infrastructure.

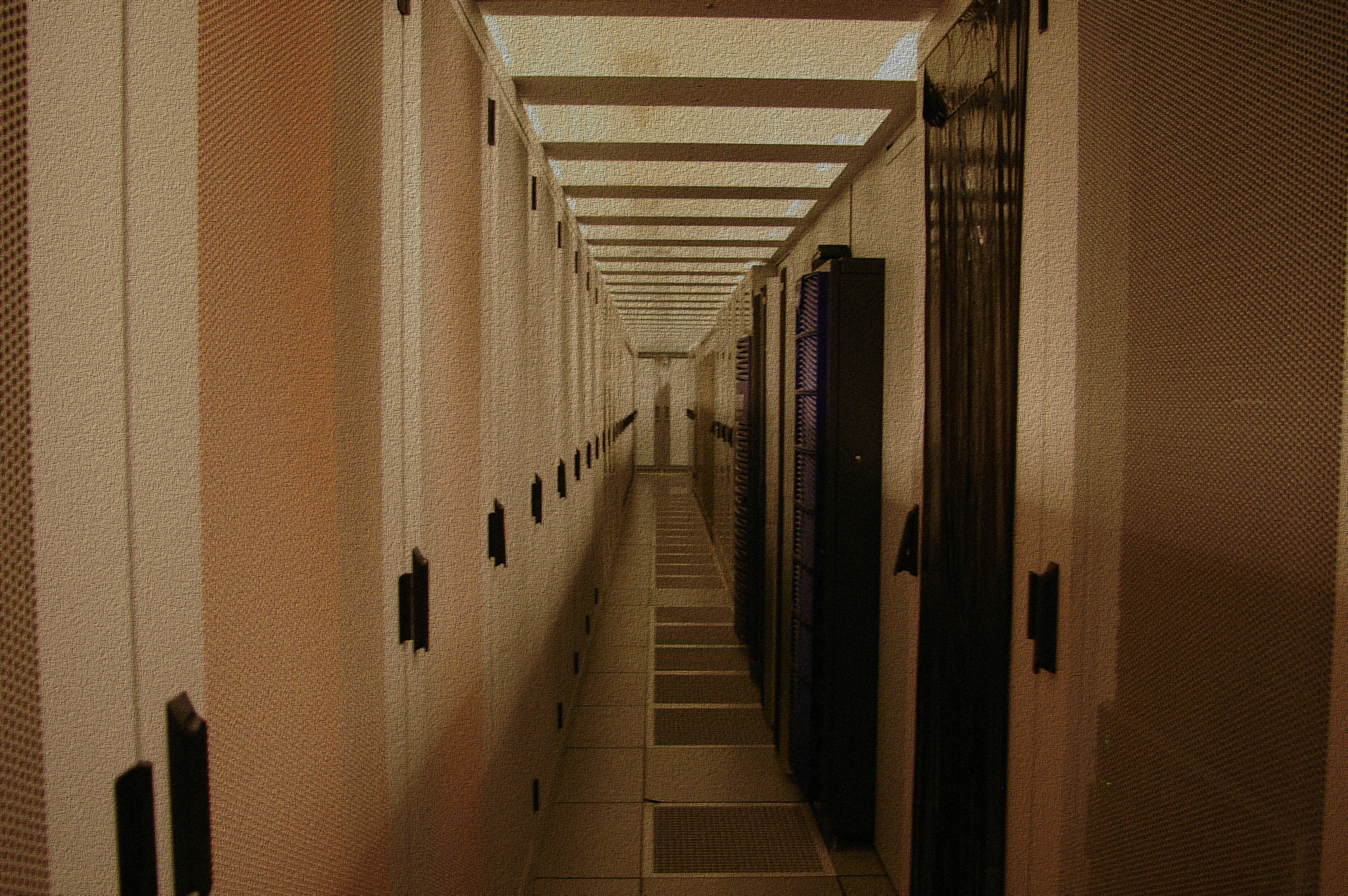
The Target data center is hosted by the Donald Smits Center for Information Technology, located at the University of Groningen.

== History ==
The project was initiated to transfer expertise of astronomers in massive data processing to other areas of science. Target builds on a distributed computing environment called Astro-WISE. Astro-WISE itself originated as an initiative of the OPTICON Wide Field Imaging Working Group, which was set up to consider a standardised European survey system to facilitate research, data reduction and data mining using data from the new generation of wide field survey cameras. The Target project launched in 2009 after receiving 32 million euros of funding for a period of five years from the European Fund for Regional Development, the Dutch Ministry of Economic Affairs ("Pieken in de Delta" project), and the provinces of Groningen and Drenthe. The project runs under the auspices of the Northern Netherlands Provinces Alliance (SNN) and the Groningen municipality.

== Technological findings ==
At the start of the project, one aim was to develop a single integrated processing system, consisting of a multi-petabyte scale file system and several different types of grid and compute clusters. During the first few years, it became apparent that different e-Science disciplines have different data processing requirements. In some areas, a massive data streaming effort takes place, as in Lofar. In astronomy, the number of data objects may run in the billions, with a limited number of data columns. In genomics, only a small number of rows are needed, but the number of columns can range in the hundreds of thousands. Other areas, such as visual text retrieval in the Monk search engine for historical manuscripts, are at an intermediate position, with hundreds of millions of rows and thousands of dimensions. Furthermore, genomics applications often require stringent access control, whereas other disciplines do not need to prioritize privacy. Consequently, the various sub-projects within Target adopted a pragmatic approach on which aspects of the WISE technology and components of the Target hardware infrastructure were applicable to their specific field.

== Projects ==
Target participates in a number of data-intensive scientific projects in astronomy, Big Data visualization (collaboration with the eScience center in Amsterdam), handwritten text recognition algorithms, medical research on healthy aging, development of diagnostic tools for Parkinson's disease, and more.

=== LOFAR Long-term Archive ===
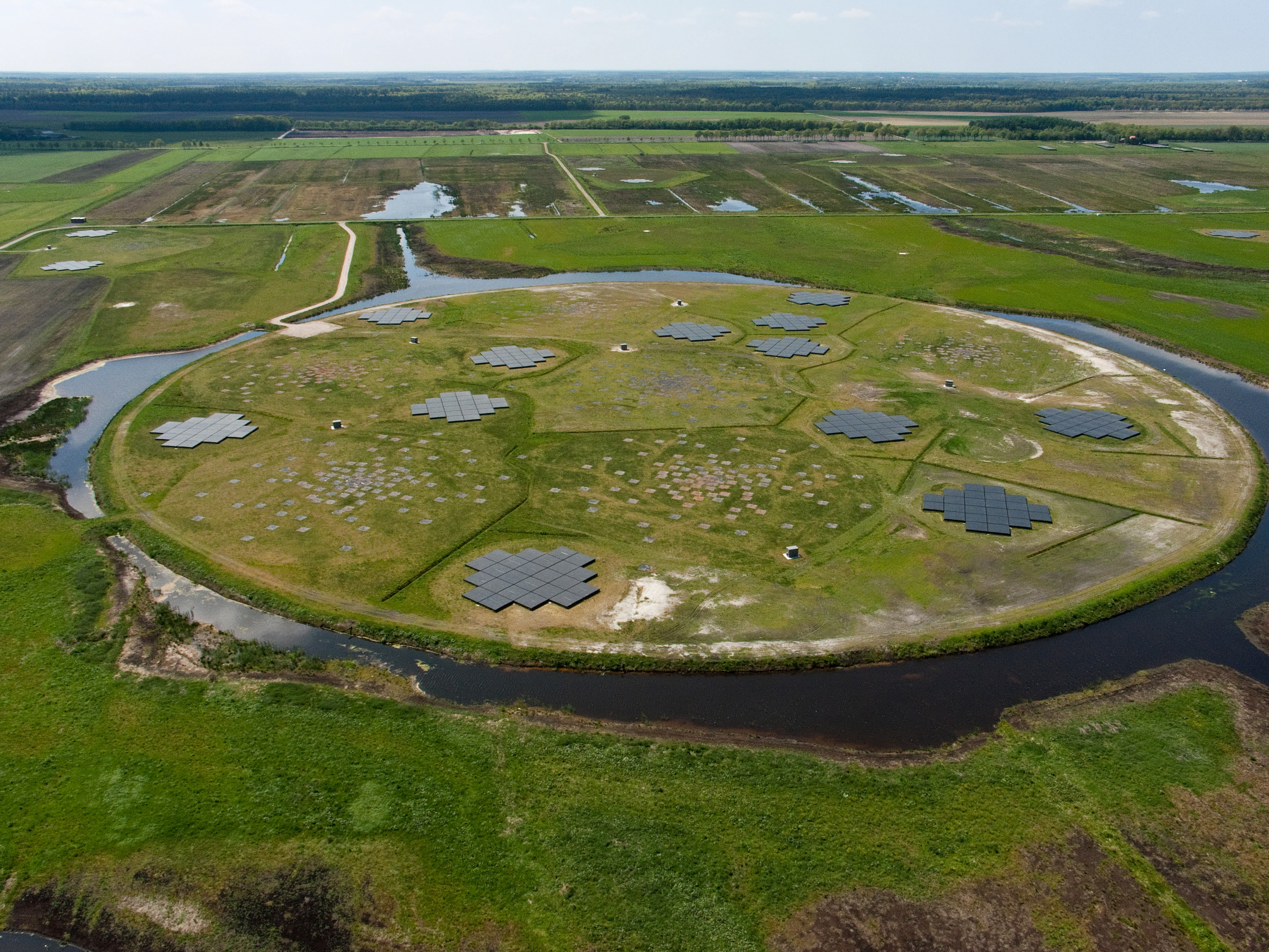
Target has developed and maintains the LOFAR Long-term Archive.

Much of the data from the LOFAR telescope is stored, accessed from, and archived on the LOFAR Long-Term archive, designed by ASTRON and Target. The data will be hosted at the Target data center and several other European centers.

=== Monk ===
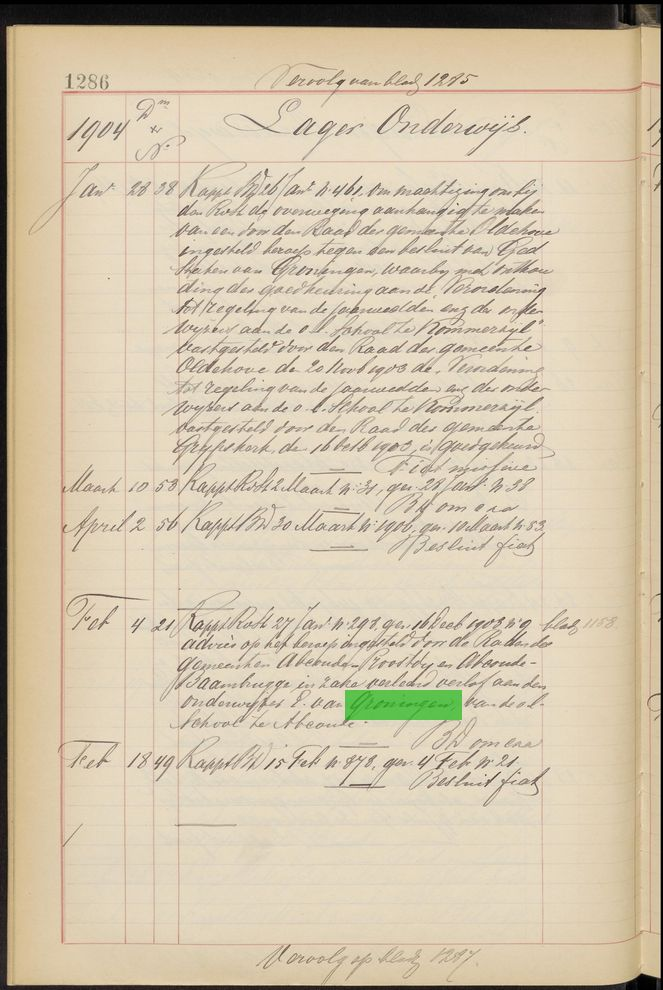
A screenshot of a page from the Archive of the Cabinet of the Dutch Queen (KdK) on which the word Groningen has been found by Monk.

Monk is a system that was developed by Schomaker and his group at the Artificial Intelligence Institute (ALICE) at the University of Groningen. It uses pattern-recognition and machine-learning algorithms for handwritten text recognition in a variety of existing archives. Currently a number of books from the Dutch National Archives, as well as more than 70 international historical collections, with text ranging from Western, medieval to handwritten Chinese manuscripts have been ingested into Monk. The systems applies continuous ('24/7') machine learning over internet, yielding fundamental results. The MONK system employs the computational and storage resource of Target. It recently became part of a collaboration, led by Prof. Popovic from the Department of Theology and Religious Studies at the University of Groningen, which will use a combination of carbon dating, paleography, and text/image recognition techniques to try and pinpoint the authors of the Dead Sea Scrolls manuscripts.

=== LifeLines ===
LifeLines is a long-term medical research project run by the University Medical Center Groningen (UMCG). An array of genotype and phenotype data will be gathered from 165000 people once every five years for a total period of thirty years, and the accumulated data will be used by researchers and medical specialists to gain insights into the processes related to aging in an attempt to understand why age-related health degradation varies so widely from person to person. Target provides LifeLines with the infrastructure for data storage, access, and processing. Data from LifeLines, as well as the SURFsara and Target infrastructure were used in the Genome of the Netherlands project, run by a consortium of the UMCG, LUMC, Erasmus MC, UMCU, and Free University of Amsterdam. Results from the project, using whole-genome sequencing to deduce population structure and demographic history of the Dutch population, were published in the Nature Genetics journal.

=== GLIMPS ===
Run by K. Leenders, a professor of neurology at the UMCG, GLIMPS is a research project set to find faster and more reliable diagnostic tools for Parkinson's disease. GLIMPS explores the possibilities of using complex image-based algorithms and PET scans for early detection of Parkinson's. To test the effectiveness of such algorithms, GLIMPS is building a large database of PET scans from several hospitals in the Netherlands. Target is responsible for building and maintaining the GLIMPS database as well as ensuring the smooth running of the image-based algorithms on its computing facilities.

=== Others ===
Additionally, Target is involved in the data management for other astronomical projects, such as the KiDs/VIKING astronomical survey using OmegaCAM, the ESO's MUSE instrument (mounted on the Very Large Telescope), and MICADO (to be mounted on the E-ELT). In addition, the data-centric approach to data management prompted by Target has been adopted by the ESA's Euclid mission. The project's spin-off company Target Holding B.V. also manages a number of commercial projects with private businesses in the North of the Netherlands.

Public outreach and education is also part of the project remit and Target has organised many public events. The Infoversum 3D theatre is a spin-off of the Target project and provides a facility for the visualisation and explanation of scientific data for large groups.
