= LORUN =

Radio telescope

LORUN stands for LOFAR at Radboud University Nijmegen. It is a radio telescope based on antennas designed for the THETA test station for the LOFAR radio telescope. This project is also closely related to the LOPES Project, it uses the data acquisition program originally designed for LOPES.
