= Joeri van Leeuwen =

Dutch astronomer

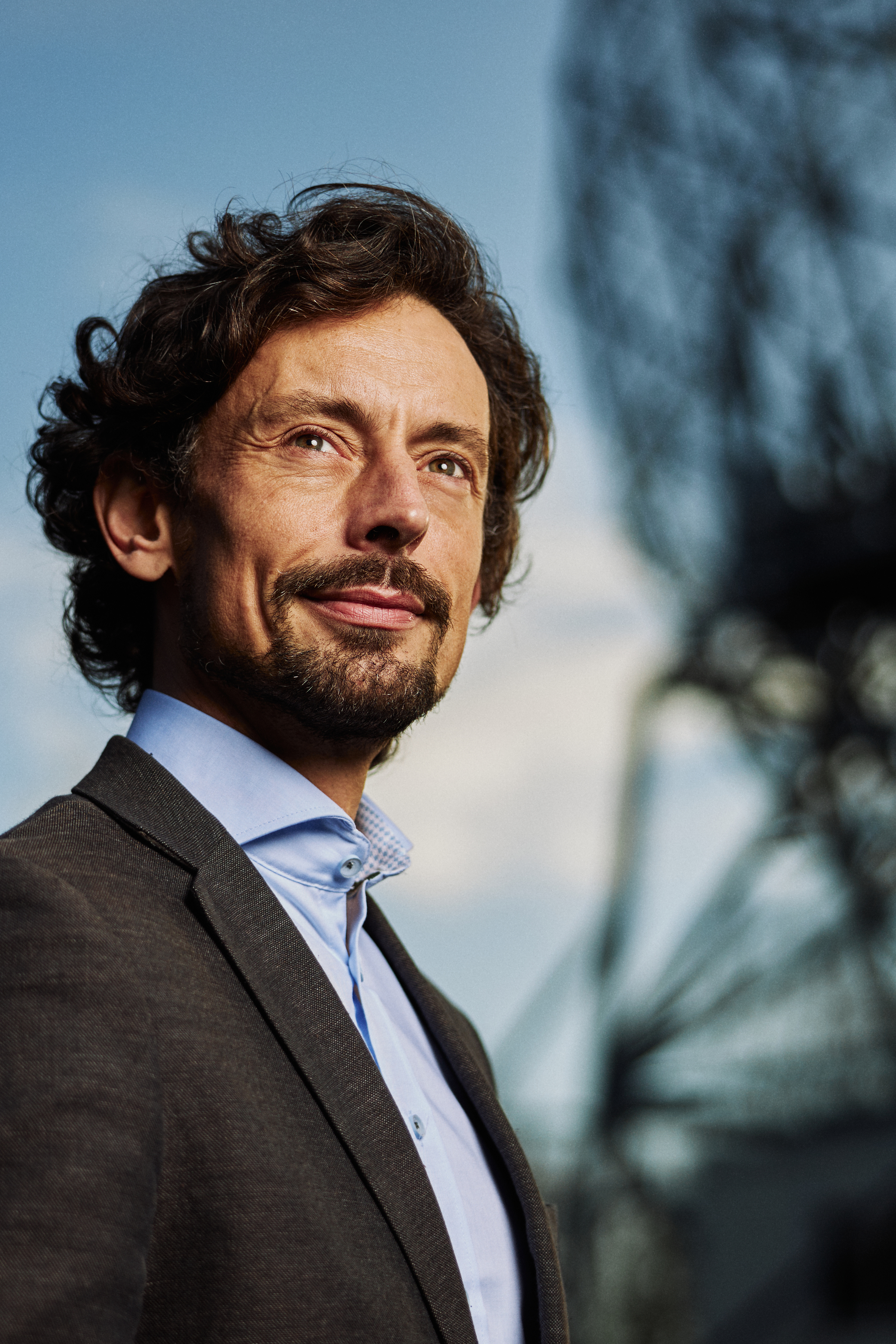
- Born: 11 January 1975 (age 51); Waardenburg, Netherlands
- Citizenship: Dutch
- Education: Utrecht University
- Known for: Pulsars, Fast Radio Bursts
- Awards: ERC Consolidator Grant (2013), Willem de Graaffprijs (2016), NWO Vici grant (2018)
- Scientific career
- Fields: Astronomy, Astrophysics
- Workplaces: ASTRON

Joeri van Leeuwen (born 11 January 1975) is a Dutch astronomer and former rower. He is best known for his work on the extreme environments around neutron stars. In particular, he works on radio-astronomical studies of pulsars and fast radio bursts.

== Academic career ==
Van Leeuwen obtained his PhD at Utrecht University in 2004, on radio observations of pulsars. He was a post-doctoral fellow at the University of British Columbia with Ingrid Stairs, working on pulsar searches using the Arecibo Telescope. As a Stensen Fellow he next worked at University of California, Berkeley with Donald C. Backer, to build and use the Allen Telescope Array. In 2008 he returned to The Netherlands, as astronomer at ASTRON. In addition, he was appointed professor at Leiden University in 2025.

Van Leeuwen wrote, produced and presented a number of TV programs for large audiences. These include several astronomy series for Het Klokhuis, the educational show on Dutch national TV.

== Research ==
Van Leeuwen's research focuses on explosions around compact objects, especially those visible with radio telescopes. He discovered the first young neutron star that is so affected by space-time curvature that it has since basically disappeared from sight. He used the Westerbork Synthesis Radio Telescope and Low-Frequency Array to discover that Fast Radio Bursts can be seen at low frequencies, and that their periodicity cannot be explained by simple stellar winds, as was previously thought.

== Honors ==
Van Leeuwen received a number of awards for his research from the Dutch and European Research Councils, and for his outreach from the Netherlands Astronomical Society. Asteroid 12952 Joerivanleeuwen is named after him.

== In sports ==
Van Leeuwen is a former professional rower. He is a two-time world record holder with the Dutch Men's Eight; he participated in three world rowing championships, and won one world-cup medal and multiple national championships.
