= 3C 298 =

Quasar in the constellation of Virgo

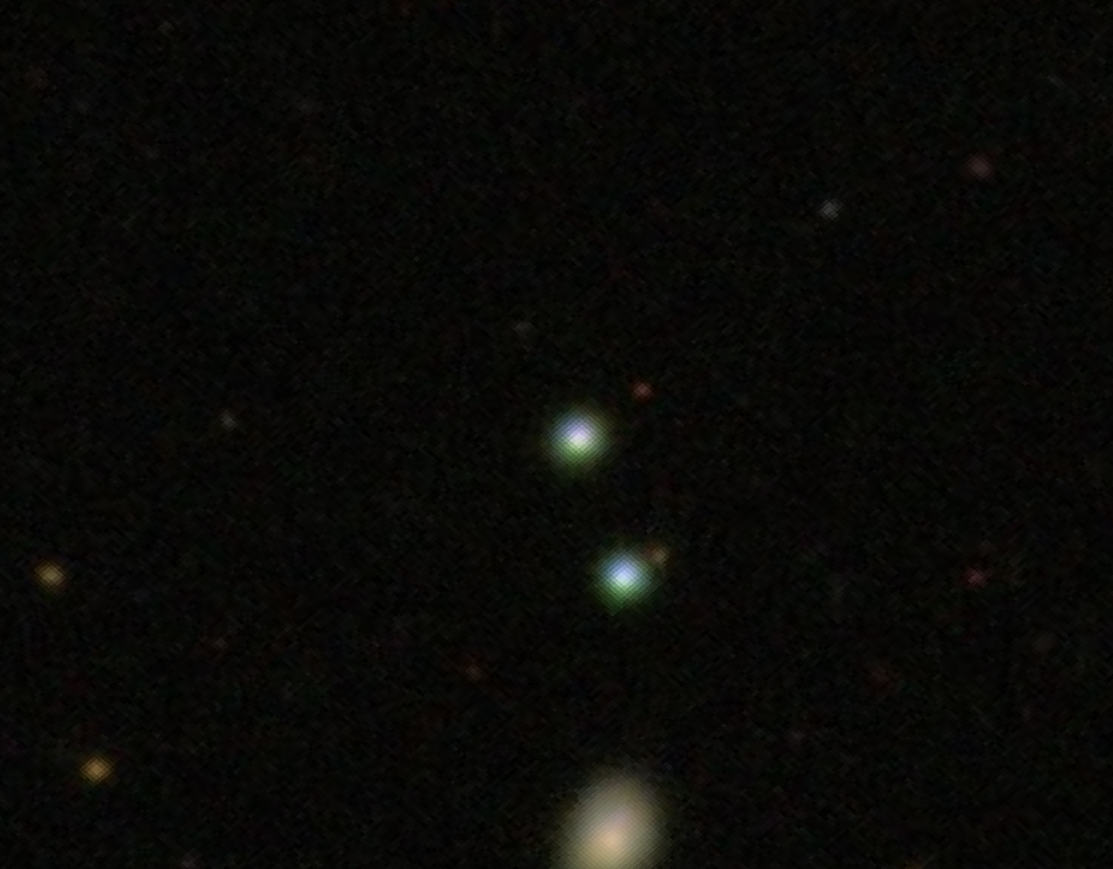
- The quasar 3C 298.

Observation data (J2000.0 epoch)
- Constellation: Virgo
- Right ascension: 14^{h} 19^{m} 08.18^{s}
- Declination: +06° 28′ 34.80″
- Redshift: 1.436208
- Heliocentric radial velocity: 430,564 km/s
- Distance: 9.365 Gly
- Apparent magnitude (V): 16.79
- Apparent magnitude (B): 17.12

Characteristics
- Type: CSS AGN
- Size: ~257,000 ly (78.8 kpc) (estimated)

Other designations
- 4C +06.49, PKS 1416+06, LEDA 2817659, SDSS J141908.17+062834.8, IRAS F154165+0642, RBS 1369, PKS B1416+067, PMN J1419+0628, DA 364, NRAO 0441, CoNFIG 190, RX J1419.1+0628, G4Jy 1144

3C 298 is a quasar located in the constellation of Virgo. The redshift of the object is estimated to be (z) 1.436 and it was first discovered by astronomers in 1959 as an astronomical radio source. It contains a compact steep spectrum source (CSS) and is classified as radio-loud, with the source considered to be the most luminous known with a value of 1.4 × 10^{28} erg s^{−1}.

== Description ==
The source of 3C 298 is found to be an asymmetric triple, mainly made up of a radio core located within a compact component and two extended radio lobes on each side of it. When imaged, the western radio lobe has a bright unpolarized hotspot located closer to the core region whereas the eastern radio lobe is connected together by a central component. International Low-Frequency Array (LOFAR) radio imaging finds the western lobe is more luminous than the eastern lobe with its estimated flux density of 54 Jansky.

Radio imaging made by Very Long Baseline Interferometry (VLBI), showed the source has two wide plume features emerging outwards from both lobes, describing its structure as S-shaped. Two compact hotspot features are present with their distances from the core being estimated as 7.9 and 4.8 kiloparsecs. Very Large Array (VLA) showed the source has a jet going in eastwards direction. This jet is found extremely polarized and is linking with an outer component. Other imaging have showed it changing its direction to north by 20° upon reaching 0.35 arcseconds from the nucleus.

The host galaxy of 3C 298 shows characteristics of a post-starburst galaxy based on strong Balmer absorption lines in its spectra and is the process of an intermediate galaxy merger resulting from the interaction of two large galaxies with their nuclei yet to merge together. The total star formation rate of the quasar is 9.3+0.4
−0.3 M_{☉} per year based on decomposition of its spectral energy distribution. There are star-forming regions offset from the host galaxy mainly dominated by both young O-type and B-type main sequence stars, which are displaying extreme ultraviolet emission. Young stellar populations are evident, indicating the host galaxy also displayed recent signs of star formation.

3C 298 is found to be powering conical ionized gas outflows. Based on observations, the outflows has a velocity of 1700 kilometers per second with its outflow rate estimated to be between 450 and 1500 M_{☉} per year. Evidence from observations, also showed a molecular gas disk is present near the outflow spatial center with a rotational velocity of ± 150 kilometers per second and a mass of 6.6 ± 0.36 × 10^{9} M_{☉}. The blueshifted molecular disk side displays signs of extended emission confirming the quasar is undergoing molecular outflow of 2300 M_{☉} per year. This outflow would deplete the molecular gas in the disk within the timeframe of three million years. A supermassive black hole mass of 10^{9.37–9.56} M_{☉} has been calculated for the quasar.

It is found there are detections of sulfur and nitrogen from outflows powered by the quasar based on a study conducted in 2025.
