= Chilbolton Observatory =

Facility for atmospheric and radio research

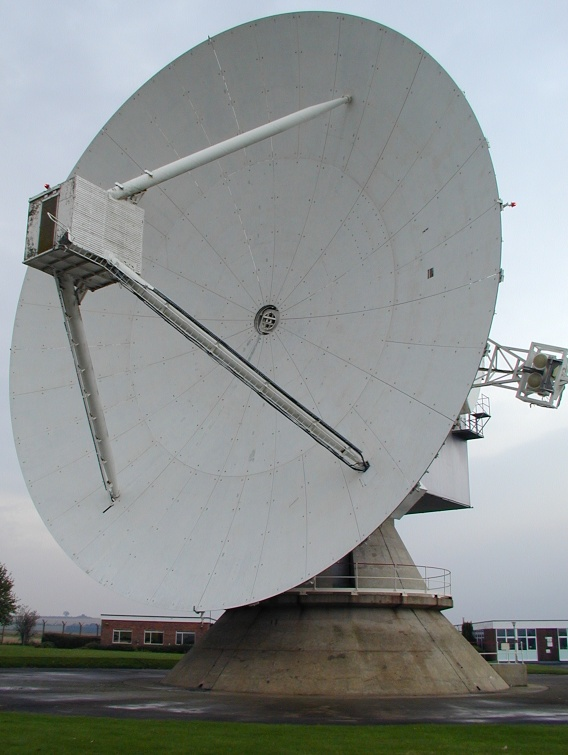
- The 25 metre (82') steerable antenna installation at the Chilbolton Observatory.
- Organization: Science and Technology Facilities Council
- Location: Chilbolton, Test Valley, Hampshire, South East England, England
- Coordinates: 51°08′40″N 1°26′19″W
- Website: www.chilbolton.stfc.ac.uk
- Telescopes: Chilbolton Advanced Meteorological Radar; Rawlings Array
- Location of Chilbolton Observatory
- Related media on Commons

The Chilbolton Observatory is a facility for atmospheric and radio research located on the edge of the village of Chilbolton near Stockbridge in Hampshire, England. The facilities are run by the STFC Radio Communications Research Unit of the Rutherford Appleton Laboratory and form part of the Science and Technology Facilities Council.

== Overview ==
The Chilbolton Observatory operates many pieces of research equipment associated with radar propagation and meteorology. As of 2007, these include:

- An S band Doppler weather radar with its distinctive, fully steerable, 25 metres (82 ft) parabolic antenna. This equipment can be referred to as CAMRa (Chilbolton Advanced Meteorological Radar).
- An L band Clear-air radar
- A W band bistatic zenith radar
- A UV Raman Lidar
- Multiple K_{a} band radiometers
- Multiple rain gauges

The observatory also hosts the UK's LOFAR station.

== Timeline of projects ==
- 1998 - CLARE'98 Cloud Lidar and Radar experiment, which eventually fed into the European Space Agency EarthCARE programme
- 2001 to 2004 - CLOUDMAP2 project to assist in Numerical weather prediction models
- 2006 - Chilbolton Observatory joined forces with several European Space Agency sites to verify the L band radio transmissions from the GIOVE-A satellite
- 2006 - NERC Cirrus and Anvils: European Satellite and Airborne Radiation measurements project
- 2008 - In-Orbit Test (IOT) performed for GIOVE-B
- 2008-9 - APPRAISE, during which the CAMRa and Lidar were used to direct airborne measurements in mixed-phase clouds
- 2010 - LOFAR station UK608 constructed

== History ==
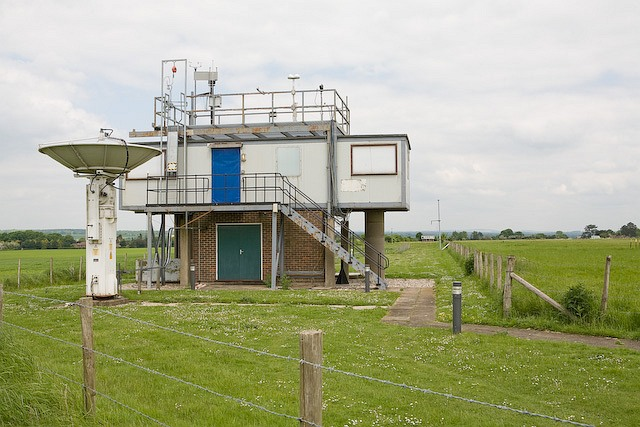
The equipment rooms at the Observatory

Construction of Chilbolton Observatory started in 1963. It was built partially on the site of RAF Chilbolton, which was decommissioned in 1946. Several sites around the south-east of England were considered for the construction. The site at Chilbolton, on the edge of Salisbury Plain, was chosen in part because of excellent visibility of the horizon and its relative remoteness from major roads whose cars could cause interference.

The facility was opened in April 1967. Within several months of being commissioned the azimuth bearing of the antenna suffered a catastrophic failure. GEC were contracted to repair the bearing and devised a system to replace the failed part while leaving the 400 tonne dish ostensibly in-place.

Originally, the antenna was engaged in K_{u} band radio astronomy, but now operates as a S and L band radar.
