= Exloo =

Village in Drenthe, Netherlands

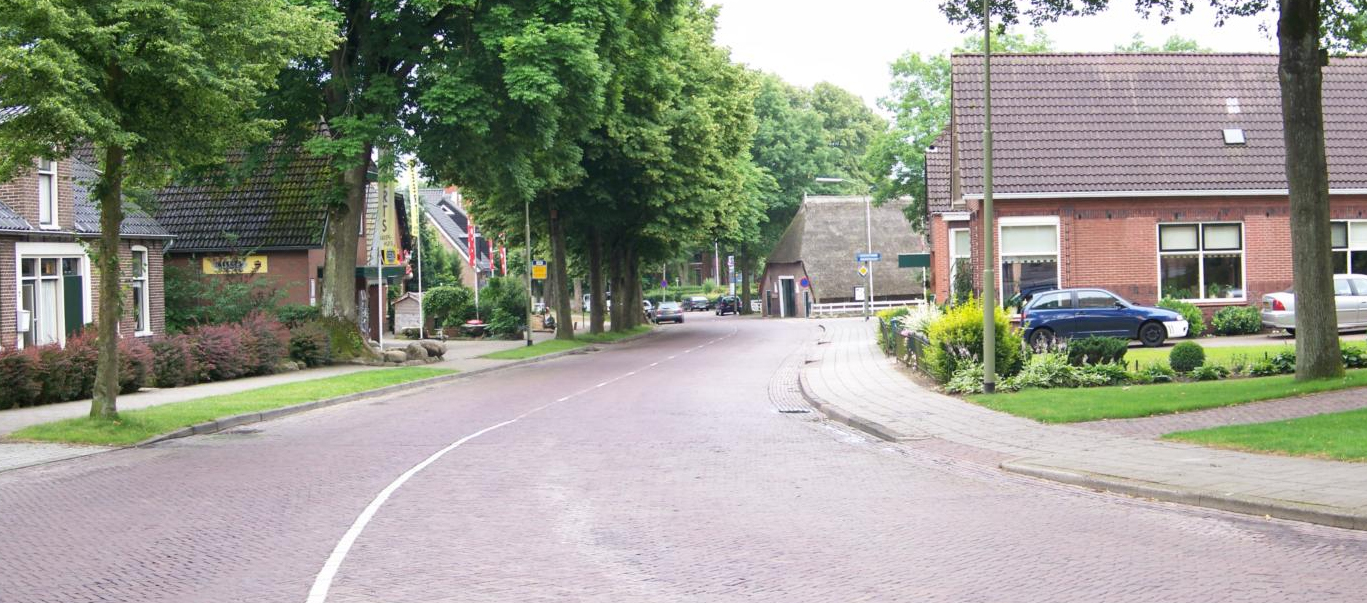

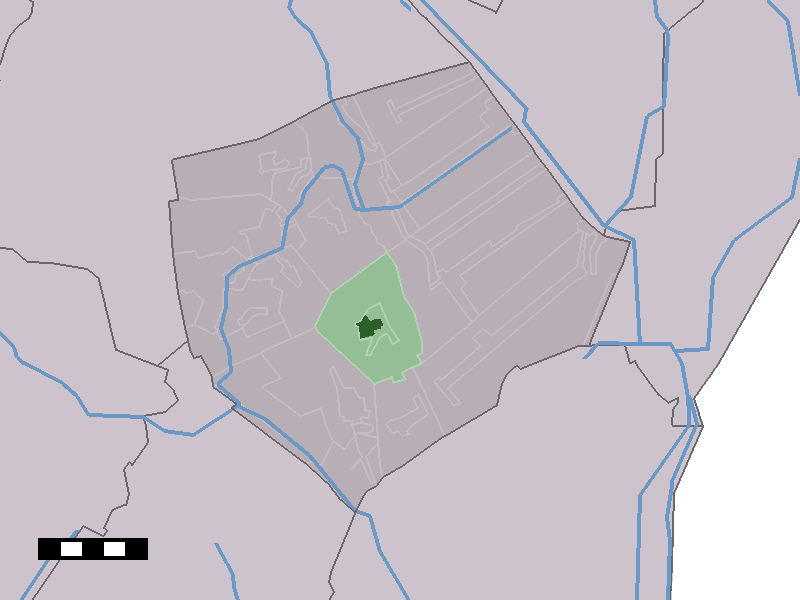
- The village centre (dark green) and the statistical district (light green) of Exloo in the municipality of Borger-Odoorn

- Location in the Netherlands Exloo (Netherlands)
- Coordinates: 52°53′N 6°52′E
- Country: Netherlands
- Province: Drenthe
- Municipality: Borger-Odoorn

Area
  - Total: 18.71 km^{2} (7.22 sq mi)
- Elevation: 17 m (56 ft)

Population (2021)
  - Total: 1,665
  - Density: 88.99/km^{2} (230.5/sq mi)
- Time zone: UTC+1 (CET)
  - Summer (DST): UTC+2 (CEST)
- Postal code: 7875
- Dialing code: 0591

Exloo (Low German: Eksel) is a village in the province of Drenthe, Netherlands, part of the municipality of Borger-Odoorn. It lies about 12 km north of Emmen.

== History ==
The village was first mentioned in 1376 as "tot Exle", and means "forest of the oak trees". Exloo is an esdorp which developed in the Middle Ages probably from Odoorn. It has three essen (communal pastures), but no church. The peat in the raised bog near Exloo was excavated around 1800. In 1850, it turned into an industry and excavation villages such as 1e Exloërmond and 2e Exloërmond were established.

Exloo was home to 570 people in 1840.

In 2010, LOFAR, a low frequency radio telescope, opened near Exloo. There are 6 stations in Exloo with a 18 stations within a 2 kilometre radius, and a further 28 in eight European countries. The set up will give LOFAR a resolution comparable to the Hubble Space Telescope.

The hunebed dolmen D30 used to have four capstones, however one is missing. Unlike the others which are placed east-west, it is placed north-south. In 1918, it was explored by Albert Egges van Giffen. There were five floors underneath, and you could stand up straight in the first part of the grave underneath. D31 is also located in Exloo, but it is a mess of scattered stone. In 1822, the stones were still in their place.

== Gallery ==
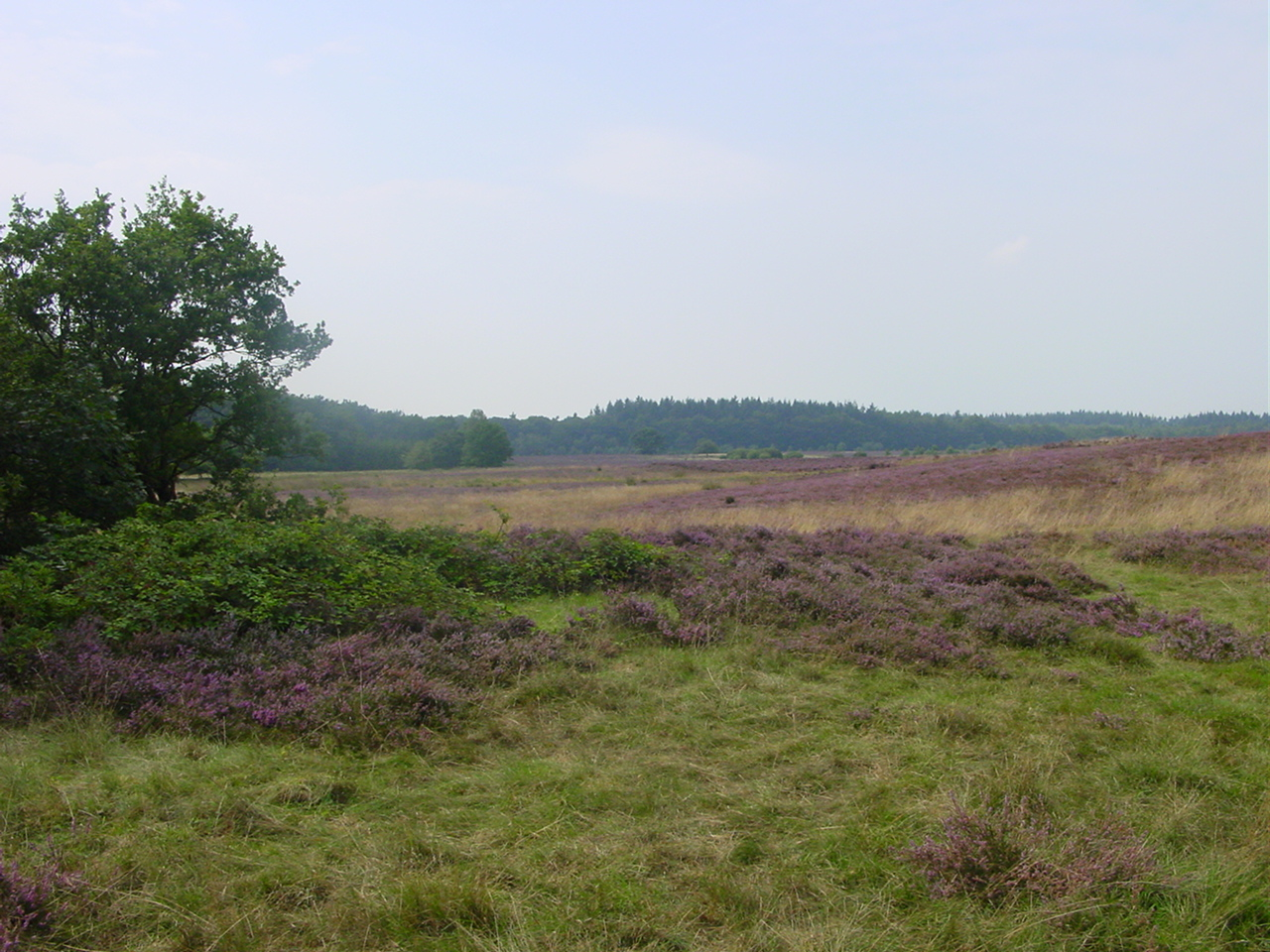
Molenveld heath, near Exloo

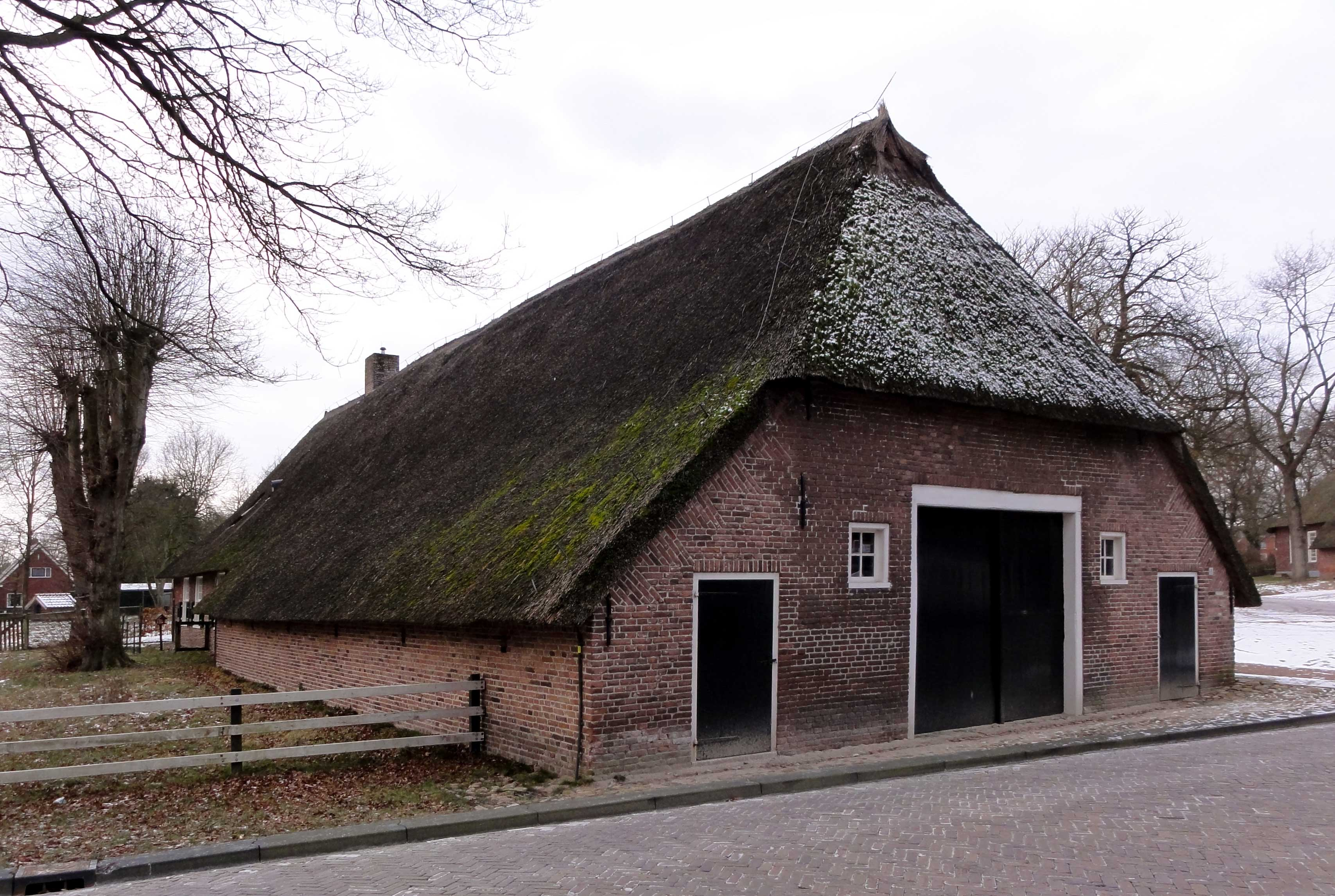
Farm in Exloo

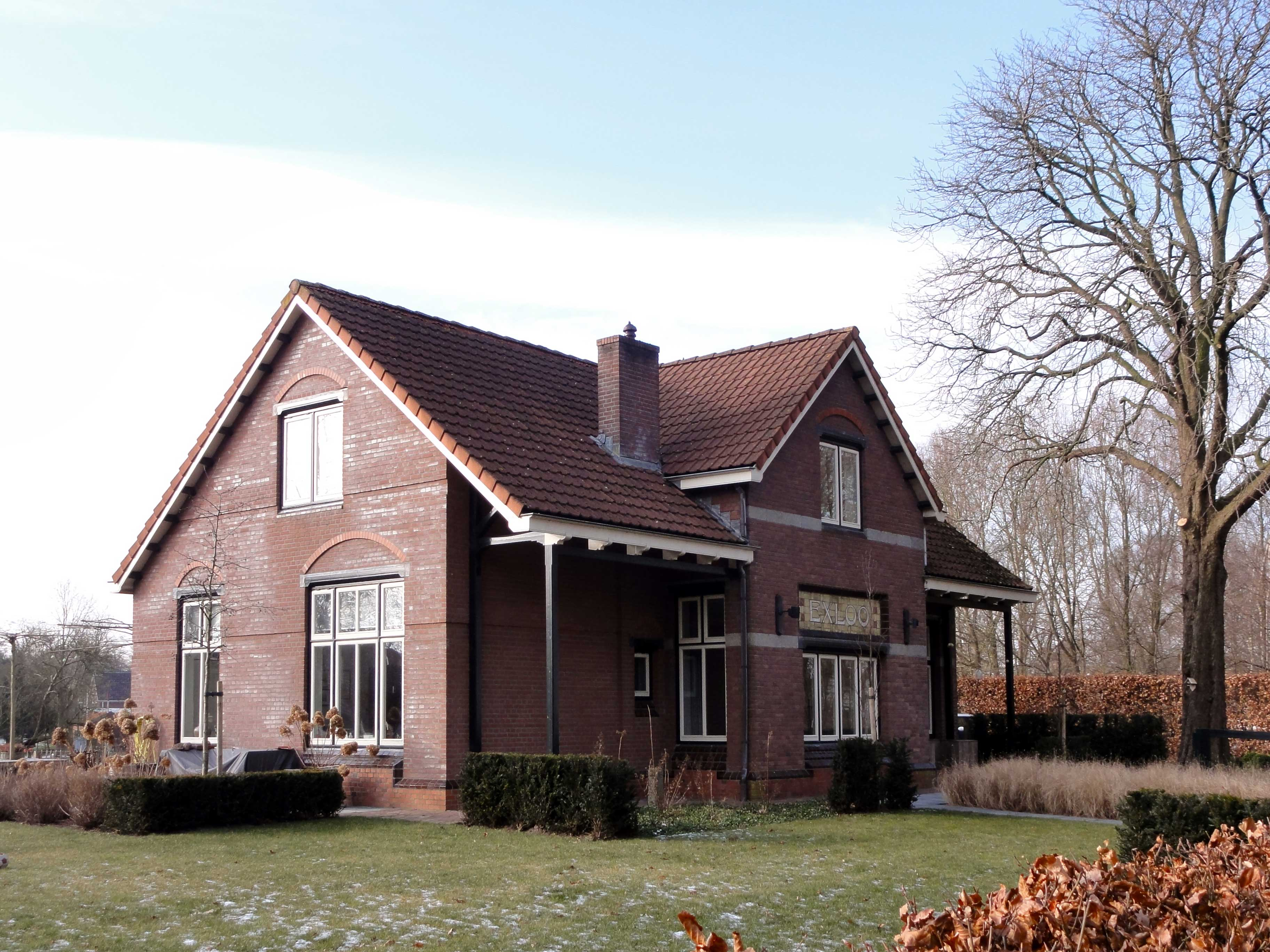
Former train station building

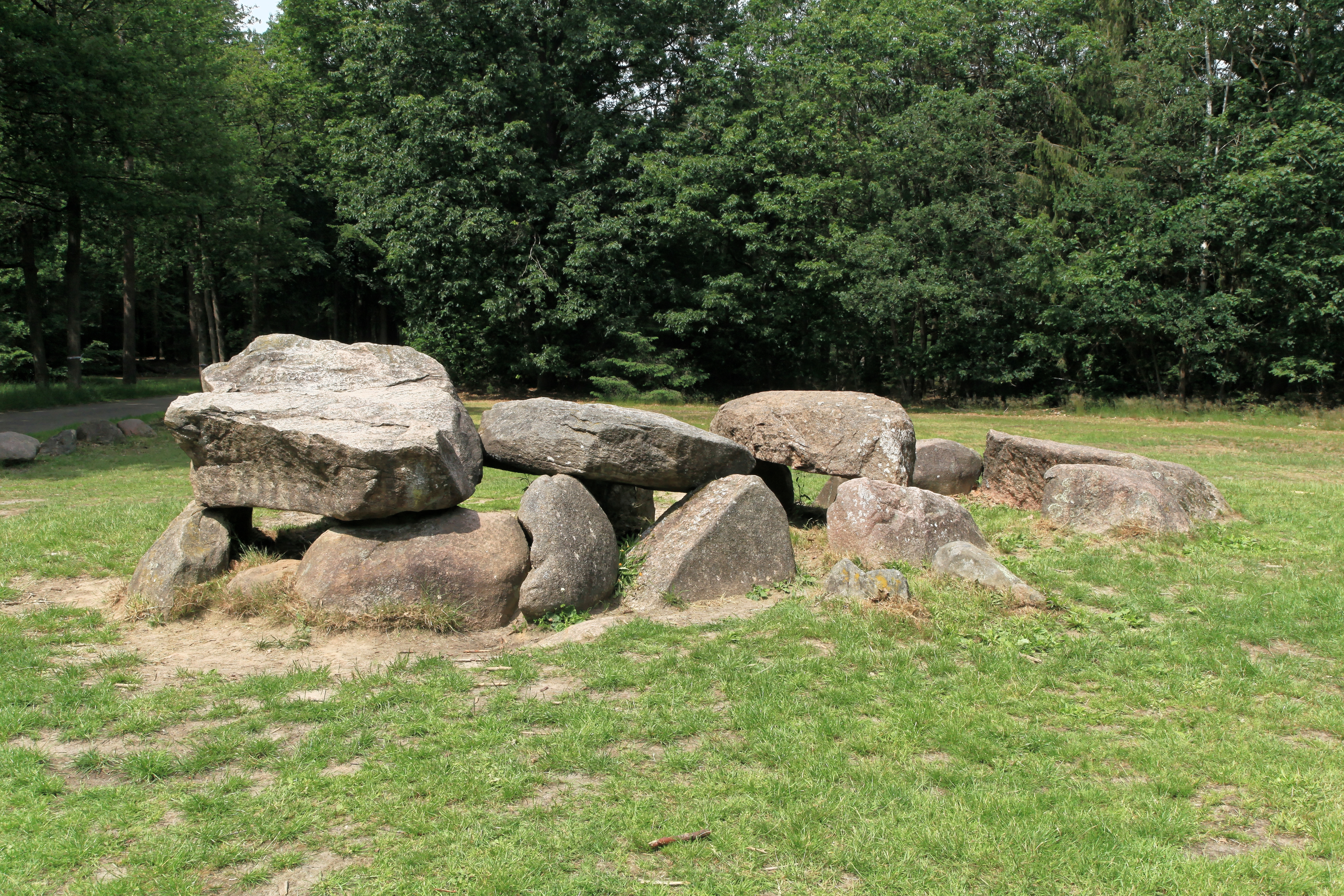
Hunebed (dolmen) D30
