= LOPES (telescope) =

Cosmic ray detector array, located in Karlsruhe, Germany

Coordinates: 49°05′57.8″N 8°26′14.7″E

The LOPES project (LOFAR PrototypE Station) was a cosmic ray detector array, located in Karlsruhe, Germany, and is operated in coincidence with an existing, well calibrated air shower experiment called KASCADE. In 2013, after approximately 10 years of measurements, LOPES was finally switched off and dismantled.

There are different ways to observe cosmic rays, or, more accurately, the air showers that cosmic rays produce when they enter our atmosphere. Traditionally, one directly measures the shower products that make it all the way to the surface. These may be detected by using for example particle counters. In the case of KASCADE, the muons in the shower produce a short flash of Cherenkov light when they traverse a slab of scintillator material. These flashes can be registered using photomultipliers.

The LOPES project aims to demonstrate the feasibility of a different technique, in which not the shower products themselves are observed, but secondary radio radiation that is generated by the shower. Charged particles in the shower, mostly electrons and positrons, are deflected slightly in Earth's magnetic field. As these particles change direction, they emit synchrotron radiation. This radiation is visible as a bright flash on the sky for several nanoseconds at frequencies up to a few hundred MHz. It is hoped that the LOPES project will pave the way for more cosmic ray experiments with digital radio telescopes, such as LOFAR.

In the first phase until 2003, LOPES consisted of ten dipole antennas. This has been expanded to a total number of 30 antennas as of summer 2005. These antennas are read out digitally and are connected to a central computer. Here, the data from the antennas is correlated by software, so that the antennas together essentially form a phased array. The software can point the array by forming a virtual beam and is also able to adaptively suppress interference from other sources, such as radio and TV stations.

The test array was first set up at the MPIfR in Bonn to check the hardware and develop the software. Afterwards it has been installed at the KASCADE experiment in Karlsruhe. This is a running and well calibrated air shower experiment, which provides LOPES with a suitable trigger and reconstructed shower parameters. These parameters will act as a starting point for LOPES and have been used to calibrate its results.

In a second phase starting 2006, 15 antennas have been rotated by 90° to measure the polarization of the radio signal emitted by air showers. This efforts have been intensified in the third and last phase of LOPES starting 2010, when 10 new antenna stations were installed which allow to measure the complete polarization at each station. After leading to many scientific results published in various journals, LOPES has finally been switched off in 2013.

LOPES is a collaboration of ASTRON (Netherlands Foundation for Research in Astronomy, Dwingeloo, The Netherlands), the Max-Planck-Institut für Radioastronomie (Bonn, Germany), Radboud University (Nijmegen, The Netherlands), the Institute of Data Processing and Electronics (IPE) and the Institut für Kernphysik (IKP), both at the Karlsruhe Institute of Technology (Karlsruhe, Germany), and the KASCADE-Grande collaboration. The KASCADE-Grande collaboration consists of groups from Germany, Poland, Romania, and Italy.

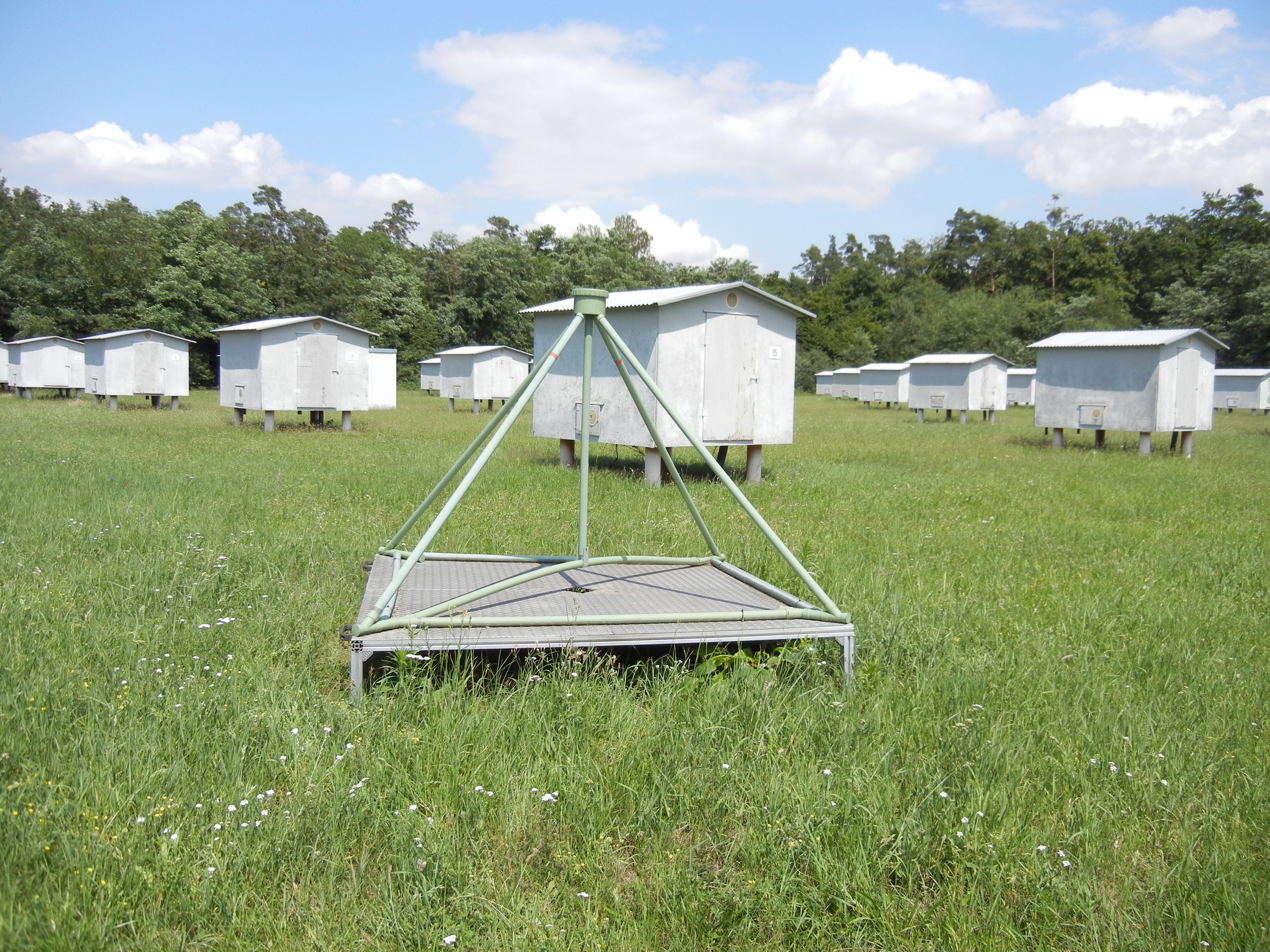
LOPES antenna at KASCADE array, Karlsruhe Institute of Technology (KIT)
