= Chilbolton =

Village and parish in Hampshire, England

Coordinates: 51.1569°N 1.4387°W

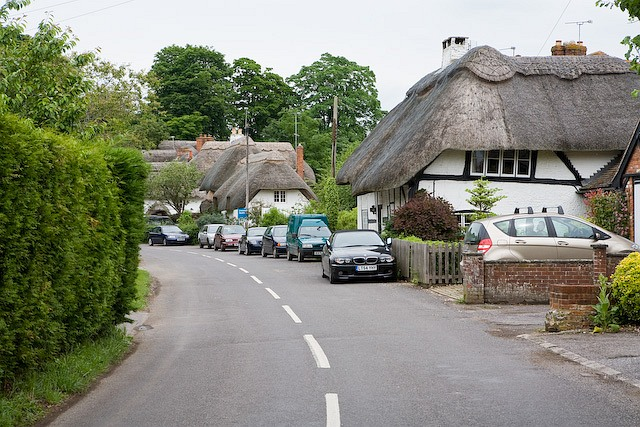
- Village street, Chilbolton

- Location within Hampshire
- Population: 1,010; 988 (2011 Census)
- OS grid reference: SU392399
- Civil parish: Chilbolton
- District: Test Valley
- Shire county: Hampshire
- Region: South East
- Country: England
- Sovereign state: United Kingdom
- Post town: Stockbridge
- Postcode district: SO20
- Dialling code: 01264
- Police: Hampshire and Isle of Wight
- Fire: Hampshire and Isle of Wight
- Ambulance: South Central
- UK Parliament: Romsey

Chilbolton is a village and civil parish in Hampshire, England, near to Stockbridge. It is situated 18 miles (29 km) north of Southampton and four miles (6.4 km) south of Andover.

== History ==
Flints and axe-heads from the Stone Age, as well as Roman coins, have been found in the village. Chilbolton is recorded in the Domesday Book of 1086 under the name Cilbodentune.

During the Victorian era, the village contained a brewery; the brewery was damaged beyond repair after an explosion in January 1884.

== Geography ==
The built environment of the village consists of thatched cottages, and newer developments which have been built since the 1950s. The centre of the village is covered by a conservation area, and the River Test runs through the village.

== Notable features ==
Chilbolton Observatory is situated on the disused RAF Chilbolton airfield in the village, and was opened in 1967.

== Religious sites ==
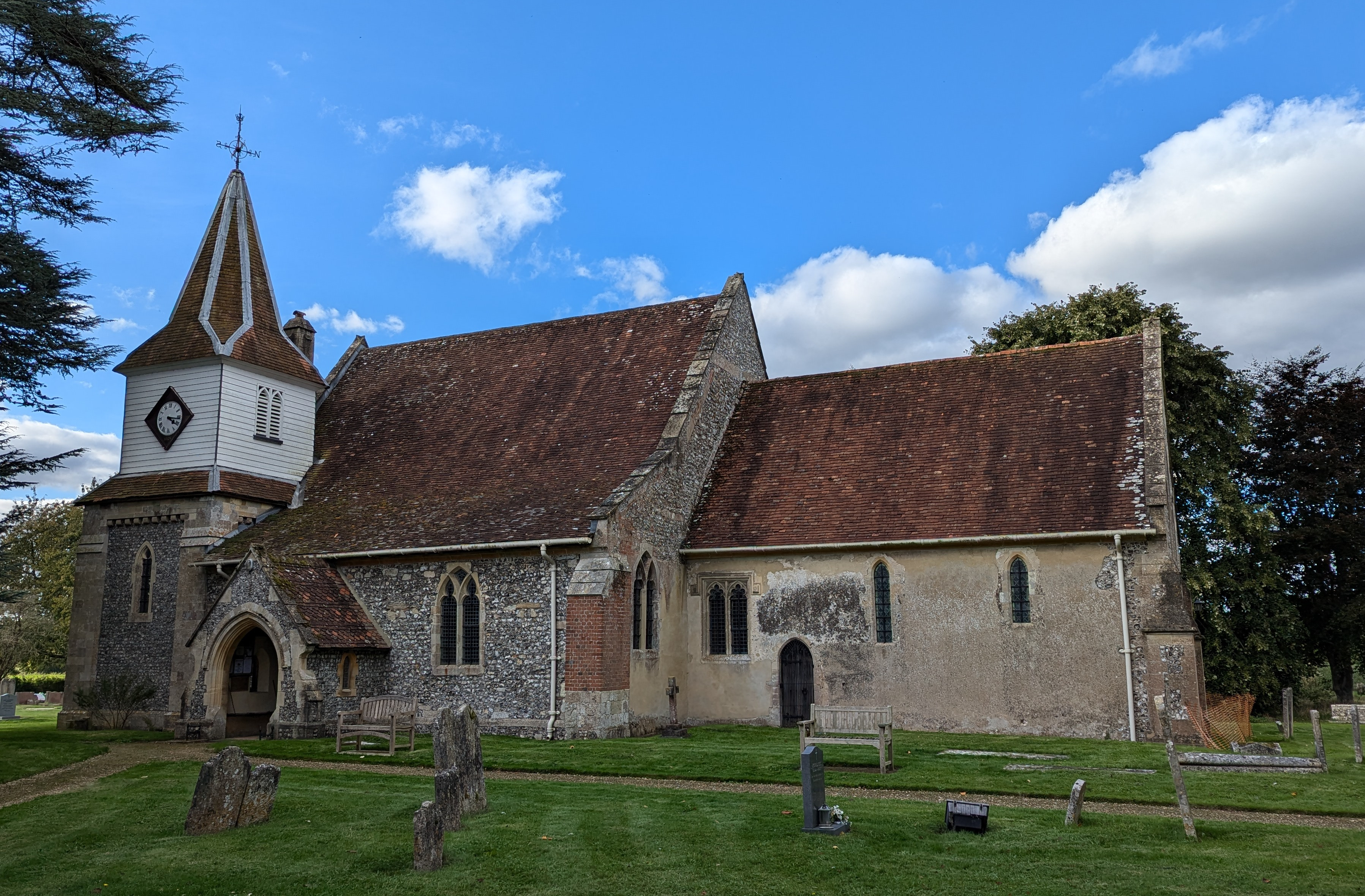
The C12 church of St. Mary The Less, at Chilbolton, Hampshire, England

The parish church of St Mary the Less dates back to the 12th century, on the site of an earlier wooden church; it is noticeable for its low tower. The name of the church is thought to have been related to a larger church in Andover which was also dedicated to Mary.

== Culture and community ==
As of 2005, the village contained a village hall, a post office, a village store and an inn called "The Abbot’s Mitre". The inn was still in operation in 2026.

== See also ==
- Chilbolton Observatory
