= Low-Frequency Array =

Radio telescope network located mainly in the Netherlands

LOw Frequency ARray
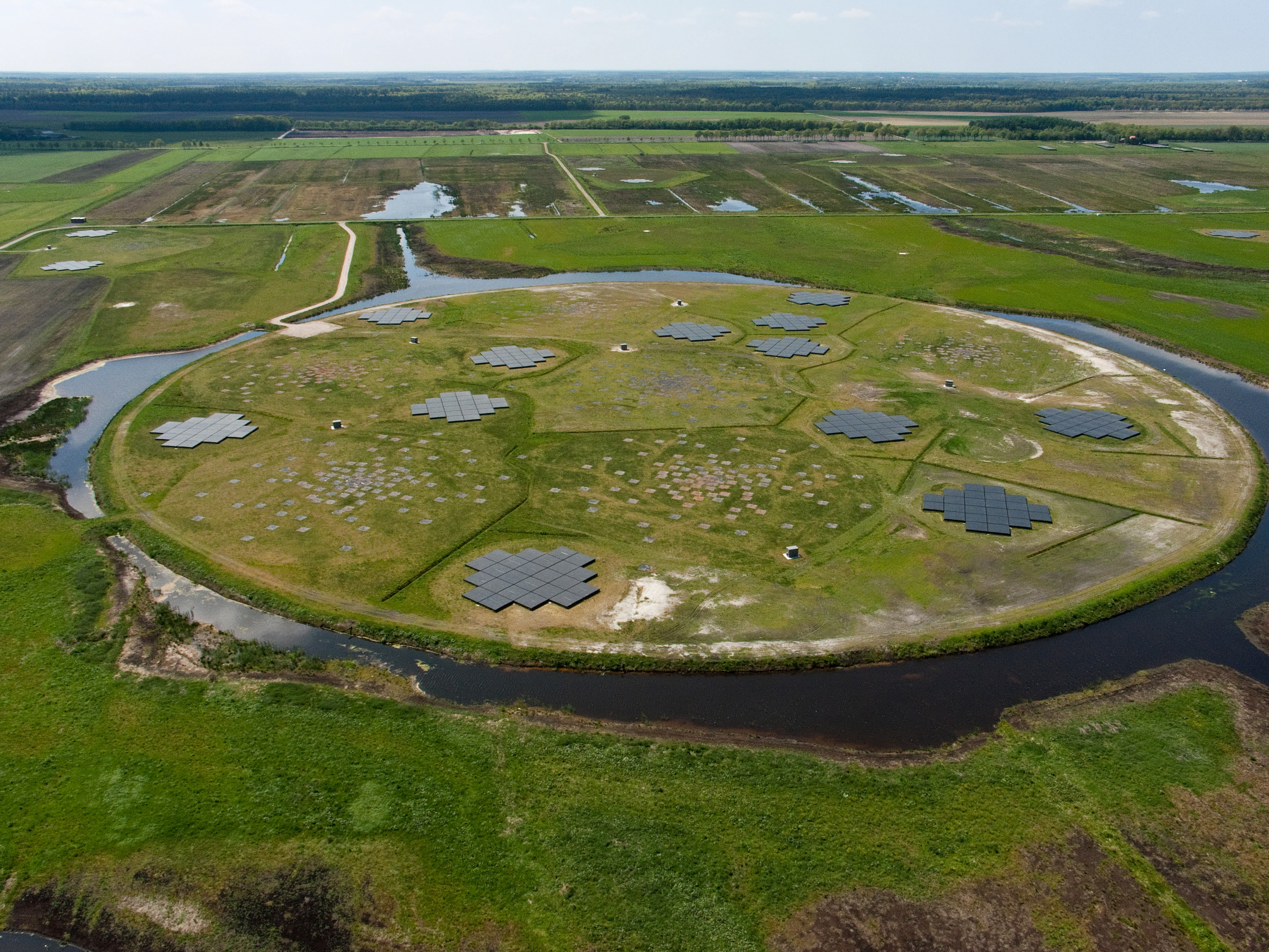
- The LOFAR core near Exloo, Netherlands. The two bridges on the left give a sense of scale.
- Alternative names: Low-Frequency Array
- Location: 3 km north of Exloo, the Netherlands (core)
- Coordinates: 52°54′32″N 6°52′08″E
- Organization: ASTRON
- Wavelength: 30 to 1.3 m (radio)
- Built: 2006–2012
- Telescope style: Phased array of a total of ~20,000 dipole antennas
- Diameter: 1000 km or more
- Collecting area: up to 1 km^{2}
- Focal length: N/A
- Mounting: fixed
- Website: www.astron.nl/telescopes/lofar
- Location within Netherlands
- Related media on Commons

The LOw Frequency ARray (LOFAR) is a large radio telescope, with an antenna network located mainly in the Netherlands, and spreading across 7 other European countries as of 2019. Originally designed and built by ASTRON, the Netherlands Institute for Radio Astronomy, it was first opened by Queen Beatrix of The Netherlands in 2010, and has since been operated by ASTRON on behalf first of the International LOFAR Telescope (ILT) partnership and now of the LOFAR ERIC by ASTRON.

LOFAR consists of a vast array of omnidirectional antennas using a modern concept, in which the signals from the separate antennas are not connected directly electrically to act as a single large antenna, as they are in most array antennas. Instead, the LOFAR dipole antennas (of two types) are distributed in stations, within which the antenna signals can be partly combined in analogue electronics, then digitised, then combined again across the full station. This step-wise approach provides great flexibility in setting and rapidly changing the directional sensitivity on the sky of an antenna station. The data from all stations are then transported over fiber to a central digital processor, and combined in software to emulate a conventional radio telescope dish with a resolving power corresponding to the greatest distance between the antenna stations across Europe.

LOFAR is thus an interferometric array, using about 20,000 small antennas concentrated in 52 stations since 2019. 38 of these stations are distributed across the Netherlands, built with regional and national funding. The six stations in Germany, three in Poland, and one each in France, Great Britain, Ireland, Latvia, and Sweden, with various national, regional, and local funding and ownership. Italy officially joined the International LOFAR Telescope (ILT) in 2018; construction at the INAF observatory site in Medicina, near Bologna, is planned as soon as upgraded (so-called LOFAR2.0) hardware becomes available. Further stations in other European countries are in various stages of planning. The total effective collecting area is approximately 300,000 square meters, depending on frequency and antenna configuration. Until 2014, data processing was performed by a Blue Gene/P supercomputer situated in the Netherlands at the University of Groningen. Since 2014 LOFAR uses a GPU-based correlator and beamformer, COBALT, for that task. LOFAR is also a technology and science pathfinder for the Square Kilometre Array.

== Technical information ==
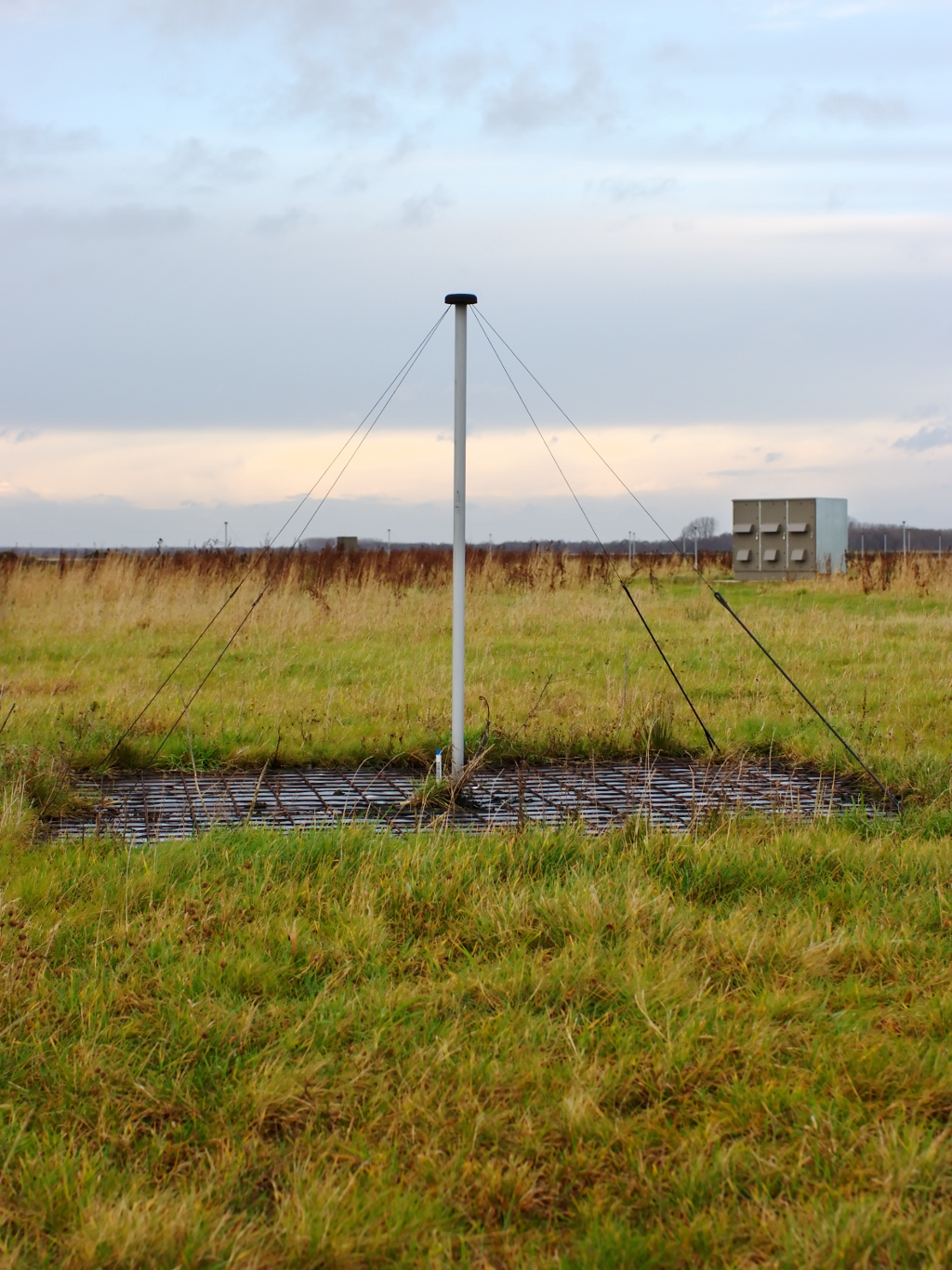
Low-band antenna with electronics cabin in the background

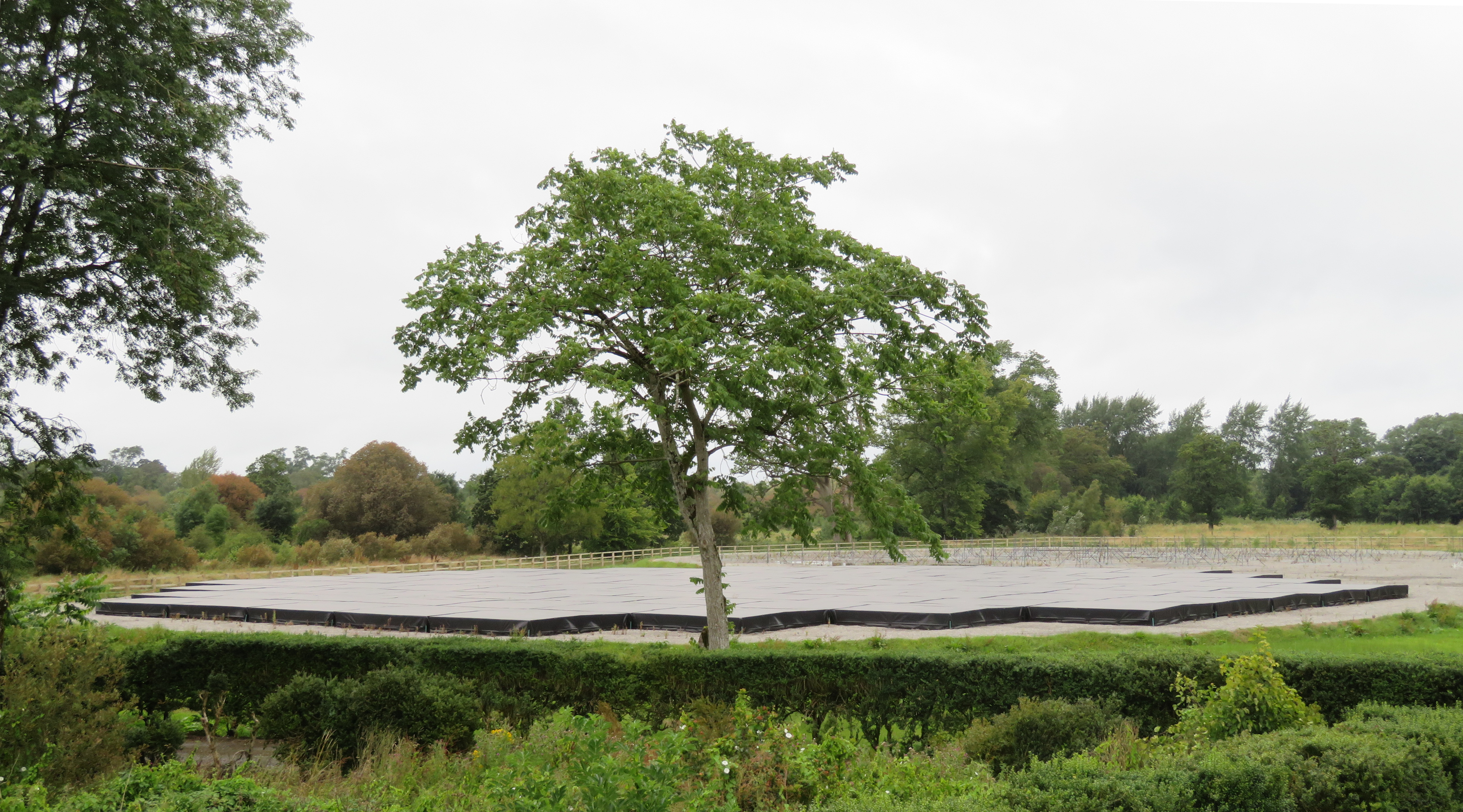
The Irish LOFAR array (I-LOFAR) in Birr, County Offaly

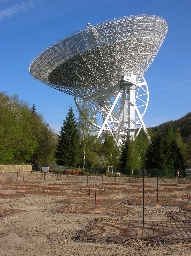
The 60 m diameter LOFAR station consisting of 96 dipole antennas (foreground) at Bad Münstereifel- Effelsberg, next to the 100 m radio telescope (background), both run by the Max Planck Institute for Radio Astronomy Bonn, Germany

LOFAR was conceived as an innovative effort to force a breakthrough in sensitivity for astronomical observations at radio-frequencies below 250 MHz. Astronomical radio interferometers usually consist either of arrays of parabolic dishes (e.g. the One-Mile Telescope or the Very Large Array), arrays of one-dimensional antennas (e.g. the Molonglo Observatory Synthesis Telescope) or two-dimensional arrays of omnidirectional antennas (e.g. Antony Hewish's Interplanetary Scintillation Array).

LOFAR combines aspects of many of these earlier telescopes; in particular, it uses omnidirectional dipole antennas as elements of a phased array at individual stations, and combines those phased arrays using the aperture synthesis technique developed in the 1950s. Like the earlier Cambridge Low Frequency Synthesis Telescope (CLFST) low-frequency radio telescope, the design of LOFAR has concentrated on the use of large numbers of relatively cheap antennas without any moving parts, concentrated in stations, with the mapping performed using aperture synthesis software. The direction of observation ("beam") of the stations is chosen electronically by phase delays between the antennas. LOFAR can observe in several directions simultaneously, as long as the aggregated data rate remains under its cap. This in principle allows a multi-user operation.

LOFAR makes observations in the 10 MHz to 240 MHz frequency range with two types of antennas: Low Band Antenna (LBA) and High Band Antenna (HBA), optimized for 10–80 MHz and 120–240 MHz respectively. The electric signals from the LOFAR stations are digitised, transported to a central digital processor, and combined in software in order to map the sky. Therefore, LOFAR is a "software telescope". The cost of such telescopes is dominated by the cost of electronics and will therefore mostly follow Moore's law, becoming cheaper with time and allowing increasingly large telescopes to be built. Each antenna is fairly simple- but there are about 20,000 of them in the LOFAR array.

=== LOFAR stations ===
To make radio surveys of the sky with adequate resolution, the antennas are arranged in clusters that are spread out over an area of more than 1000 km in diameter. The LOFAR stations in the Netherlands reach baselines of about 100 km. LOFAR currently receives data from 24 core stations (in Exloo), 14 'remote' stations in The Netherlands, and 14 international stations. Each of the core and remote stations has 48 HBAs and 96 LBAs and a total of 48 digital Receiver Units (RCUs). International stations have 96 LBAs and 96 HBAs and a total of 96 digital Receiver Units (RCUs).

The locations of the international LOFAR stations are:

- Bulgaria – planned at the site of the National Astronomical Observatory Rozhen
- Czechia – site to be announced
- France
  - Nançay – at the site of the Nançay Radio Telescope
- Germany
  - Effelsberg – run by Max Planck Institute for Radio Astronomy, at the site of the Effelsberg Radio Telescope
  - Unterweilenbach/Garching – run by Max Planck Institute for Astrophysics
  - Tautenburg – at the site of the Thüringer Landessternwarte Tautenburg (Thuringian State Observatory)
  - Potsdam-Bornim – run by Astrophysikalisches Institut Potsdam
  - Jülich – run by the University of Bochum, Jacobs University Bremen, and Forschungszentrum Jülich
  - Norderstedt – run by Hamburg Observatory and Bielefeld University
- Ireland
  - Birr – run by Trinity College Dublin at the Rosse Observatory on the grounds of Birr Castle
- Italy – planned at the site of the Medicina Observatory
- Latvia
  - Ventspils – at the site of Ventspils International Radio Astronomy Centre in Irbene
- Poland
  - Bałdy – run by the University of Warmia and Mazury in Olsztyn
  - Borówiec – run by the Space Research Centre of Polish Academy of Sciences
  - Łazy – run by Jagiellonian University
- Sweden
  - Onsala – at the site Onsala Space Observatory
- United Kingdom
  - Chilbolton – at the site of the Chilbolton Observatory

=== NenuFAR ===
The New Extension in Nançay Upgrading LOFAR (NenuFAR) telescope is co-located at the Nançay radio telescope in central France. It is an extension of the Nançay LOFAR station (FR606), adding 96 low frequency tiles, each consisting of a "mini-array" of 19 crossed-dipole antennas, distributed in a circle with a diameter of approximately 400 m. The tiles are a hexagonal cluster with analogically phased antennas. The telescope can capture radio frequencies in the 10–85 MHz range, covering the LOFAR-Low Band (30–80 MHz) range as well. The NenuFAR array can work as a high-sensitivity LOFAR-compatible super-LBA station (LSS), operating together with rest of LOFAR to increase to array's global sensitivity by nearly a factor of two, and improve the array's imaging capabilities. It can also function as a second supercore to improve array availability. Due to its dedicated receiver, NenuFAR can also operate as a standalone instrument, known as NenuFAR/Standalone in this mode.

=== Other stations ===
Additionally, a set of LOFAR antennas is deployed at the KAIRA (Kilpisjärvi Atmospheric Imaging Receiver Array) near Kilpisjärvi, Finland. This installation functions as a VHF receiver either in stand-alone mode or part of a bistatic radar system together with EISCAT transmitter in Tromsø.

=== Data transfer ===
Data transport requirements are in the range of several gigabits per second per station and the processing power needed is several tens of TeraFLOPS. The data from LOFAR is stored in the LOFAR long-term archive. The archive is implemented as distributed storage, with data spread over the Target data centre located in the Donald Smits Center for Information Technology at the University of Groningen, SURFsara centre in Amsterdam, and the Forschungszentrum Jülich in Germany.

== Sensitivity ==
The mission of LOFAR is to map the Universe at radio frequencies from ~10–240 MHz with greater resolution and greater sensitivity than previous surveys, such as the 7C and 8C surveys, and surveys by the Very Large Array (VLA) and Giant Meterwave Radio Telescope (GMRT).

LOFAR will be the most sensitive radio observatory at its low observing frequencies until the Square Kilometre Array (SKA) comes online in the late 2020s. Even then, the SKA will only observe at frequencies >50 MHz and LOFAR's angular resolution will remain far superior.

== Science case ==
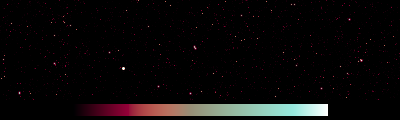
At low radio frequencies the sky is dominated by small bright sources (shown is a 151 MHz map of the region: 140° to 180° Galactic longitude; -5° to 5° Galactic latitude). LOFAR will have sufficient fidelity and sensitivity to see faint structure between these bright sources because of the very large number of array elements.

The sensitivities and spatial resolutions attainable with LOFAR make possible several fundamental new studies of the Universe as well as facilitating unique practical investigations of the Earth's environment. In the following list the term z is a dimensionless quantity indicating the redshift of the radio sources seen by LOFAR.

- In the very distant Universe (6 < z < 10), LOFAR can search for the signature produced by the reionization of neutral hydrogen. This crucial phase change is predicted to occur at the epoch of the formation of the first stars and galaxies, marking the end of the so-called "dark ages". The redshift at which reionization is thought to occur will shift the 21 cm line of neutral hydrogen at 1420.40575 MHz into the LOFAR observing window. The frequency observed today is lower by a factor of 1/(z+1).
- In the distant "formative" Universe (1.5 < z < 7), LOFAR is capable of detecting the most distant massive galaxies and will study the processes by which the earliest structures in the Universe (galaxies, clusters and active nuclei) form and probe the intergalactic gas.
- In the magnetic Universe, LOFAR is mapping the distribution of cosmic rays and global magnetic fields in our own and nearby galaxies, in galaxy clusters and in the intergalactic medium.
- The high-energy Universe, LOFAR detects the ultra high energy cosmic rays as they pierce the Earth's atmosphere. A dedicated test station for this purpose, LOPES, has been in operation since 2003.
- Within the Milky Way galaxy, LOFAR has detected many new pulsars within a few kpc from the Sun, has searched for short-lived transient events produced by stellar mergers or black hole accretion, and will search for bursts from Jupiter-like extrasolar planets.
- Within the Solar System, LOFAR detects coronal mass ejections from the Sun and provide continuous large-scale maps of the solar wind. This crucial information about solar weather and its effect on Earth facilitates predictions of costly and damaging geomagnetic storms.
- Within the Earth's immediate environment, LOFAR will map irregularities in the ionosphere continuously, detect the ionizing effects of distant gamma-ray bursts and the flashes predicted to arise from the highest energy cosmic rays, the origins of which are unclear.
- By exploring a new spectral window LOFAR is likely to make serendipitous discoveries. Detection of new classes of objects or new astrophysical phenomena have resulted from almost all previous facilities that open new regions of the spectrum, or pushed instrumental parameters, such as sensitivity by more than an order of magnitude.

=== Key projects ===
==== The epoch of reionization ====
One of the most exciting, but technically most challenging, applications of LOFAR will be the search for redshifted 21 cm line emission from the Epoch of Reionization (EoR). It is thought that the 'Dark Ages', the period after recombination when the Universe turned neutral, lasted until around z=20. WMAP polarization results appear to suggest that there may have been extended, or even multiple phases of reionisation, the start possibly being around z~15–20 and ending at z~6. Using LOFAR, the redshift range from z=11.4 (115 MHz) to z=6 (200 MHz) can be probed. The expected signal is small, and disentangling it from the much stronger foreground emission is challenging.

==== Deep extragalactic surveys ====
One of the most important applications of LOFAR will be to carry out large-sky surveys. Such surveys are well suited to the characteristics of LOFAR and have been designated as one of the key projects that have driven LOFAR since its inception. Such deep LOFAR surveys of the accessible sky at several frequencies will provide unique catalogues of radio sources for investigating several fundamental areas of astrophysics, including the formation of massive black holes, galaxies and clusters of galaxies. Because the LOFAR surveys will probe an unexplored parameter of the Universe, it is likely that they will discover new phenomena. In February 2021, astronomers released, for the first time, a very high-resolution image of 25,000 active supermassive black holes, covering four percent of the Northern celestial hemisphere, based on ultra-low radio wavelengths, as detected by LOFAR.

==== Transient radio phenomena and pulsars ====
The combination of low frequencies, omnidirectional antennae, high-speed data transport and computing means that LOFAR will open a new era in the monitoring of the radio sky. It will be possible to make sensitive radio maps of the entire sky visible from The Netherlands (about 60% of the entire sky) in only one night. Transient radio phenomena, only hinted at by previous narrow-field surveys, will be discovered, rapidly localised with unprecedented accuracy, and automatically compared to data from other facilities (e.g. gamma-ray, optical, and X-ray observatories). Such transient phenomena may be associated with exploding stars, black holes, flares on Sun-like stars, radio bursts from exoplanets or even SETI signals. In addition, this key science project will make a deep survey for radio pulsars at low radio frequencies, and will attempt to detect giant radio bursts from rotating neutron stars in distant galaxies.

==== Ultra high-energy cosmic rays ====
LOFAR offers a unique possibility in particle physics for studying the origin of high-energy and ultra-high-energy cosmic rays (HECRs and UHECRs) at energies between 10^{15}–10^{20.5} eV. Both the sites and processes for accelerating particles are unknown. Possible candidate sources of these HECRs are shocks in radio lobes of powerful radio galaxies, intergalactic shocks created during the epoch of galaxy formation, so-called Hyper-novae, gamma-ray bursts, or decay products of super-massive particles from topological defects, left over from phase transitions in the early Universe. The primary observable is the intense radio pulse that is produced when a primary CR hits the atmosphere and produces an extensive air shower (EAS). An EAS is aligned along the direction of motion of the primary particle, and a substantial part of its component consists of electron-positron pairs which emit radio emission in the terrestrial magnetosphere (e.g., geo-synchrotron emission).

==== Cosmic magnetism ====
LOFAR opens the window to the so far unexplored low-energy synchrotron radio waves, emitted by cosmic-ray electrons in weak magnetic fields. Very little is known about the origin and evolution of cosmic magnetic fields. The space around galaxies and between galaxies may all be magnetic, and LOFAR may be the first to detect weak radio emission from such regions. LOFAR will also measure the Faraday effect, which is the rotation of polarization plane of low-frequency radio waves, and gives another tool to detect weak magnetic fields.

==== Solar physics and space weather ====
The Sun is an intense radio source. The already strong thermal radiation of the 10^{6} K hot solar corona is superimposed by intense radio bursts that are associated with phenomena of the solar activity, like flares and coronal mass ejections (CMEs). Solar radio radiation in the LOFAR frequency range is emitted in the middle and upper corona. So LOFAR is an ideal instrument for studies of the launch of CMEs heading towards interplanetary space. LOFAR's imaging capabilities will yield information on whether such a CMEs might hit the Earth. This makes LOFAR is a valuable instrument for space weather studies.

Solar observations with LOFAR will include routine monitoring of the solar activity as the root of space weather. Furthermore, LOFAR's flexibility enables rapid responses to solar radio bursts with follow-up observations. Solar flares produce energetic electrons that not only lead to the emission of non-thermal solar radio radiation. The electrons also emit X-rays and heat the ambient plasma. So joint observation campaigns with other ground- and space-based instruments, e.g. RHESSI, Hinode, the Solar Dynamics Observatory (SDO), and eventually the Advanced Technology Solar Telescope and the Solar Orbiter provide insights into this fundamental astrophysical process.

== Timeline ==
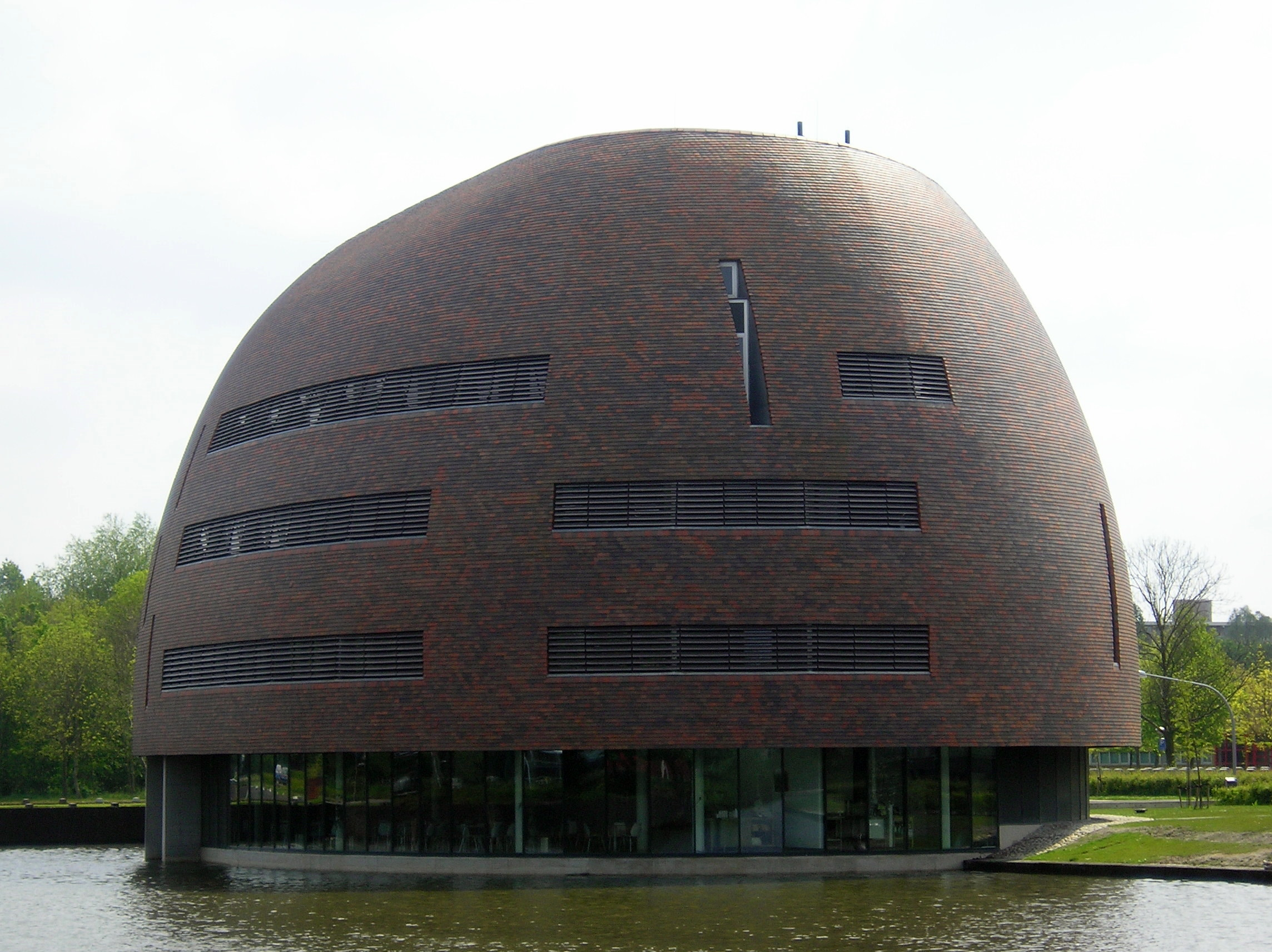
The 'Smitsborg' building at the University of Groningen, which houses LOFAR's computing centre

In the early 1990s, the study of aperture array technology for radio astronomy was being actively studied by ASTRON – the Netherlands Institute for Radio Astronomy. At the same time, scientific interest in a low-frequency radio telescope began to emerge at ASTRON and at the Dutch Universities. A feasibility study was carried out and international partners sought during 1999. In 2000 the Netherlands LOFAR Steering Committee was set up by the ASTRON Board with representatives from all interested Dutch university departments and ASTRON.

In November 2003 the Dutch Government allocated 52 million euro to fund the infrastructure of LOFAR under the Bsik programme. In accordance with Bsik guidelines, LOFAR was funded as a multidisciplinary sensor array to facilitate research in geophysics, computer sciences and agriculture as well as astronomy.

In December 2003 LOFAR's Initial Test Station (ITS) became operational. The ITS system consists of 60 inverse V-shaped dipoles; each dipole is connected to a low-noise amplifier (LNA), which provides enough amplification of the incoming signals to transport them over a 110 m-long (360 ft) coaxial cable to the receiver unit (RCU).

On April 26, 2005, an IBM Blue Gene/L supercomputer was installed at the University of Groningen's math centre, for LOFAR's data processing. At that time it was the second most powerful supercomputer in Europe, after the MareNostrum in Barcelona. Since 2014 an even more powerful computing cluster (correlator) called COBALT performs the correlation of signals from all individual stations.

In August/September 2006 the first LOFAR station (Core Station CS001, a.k.a. CS1 52°54′32″N 6°52′8″E) was put in the field using pre-production hardware. A total of 96 dual-dipole antennas (the equivalent of a full LOFAR station) are grouped in four clusters, the central cluster with 48 dipoles and other three clusters with 16 dipoles each. Each cluster is about 100 m (330 ft) in size. The clusters are distributed over an area of ~500 m in diameter.

In November 2007 the first international LOFAR station (DE601) next to the Effelsberg 100 m radio telescope became the first operational station. The first fully complete station, (CS302) on the edge of the LOFAR core, was delivered in May 2009, with a total of 40 Dutch stations scheduled for completion in 2013. By 2014, 38 stations in the Netherlands, five stations in Germany (Effelsberg, Tautenburg, Unterweilenbach, Bornim/Potsdam, and Jülich), and one each in the UK (Chilbolton), in France (Nançay) and in Sweden (Onsala) were operational. The station at Birr in Ireland was added in 2017.

LOFAR was officially opened on 12 June 2010 by Queen Beatrix of the Netherlands. Regular observations started in December 2012.

== See also ==
- ASKAP: Australian Square Kilometre Array Pathfinder
- Giant Metrewave Radio Telescope
- Long Wavelength Array (LWA)
- LORUN: LOFAR at Radboud University Nijmegen
- MeerKAT: Karoo Array Telescope
- Murchison Widefield Array (MWA)
- Precision Array for Probing the Epoch of Reionization
- Ukrainian T-shaped Radio telescope, second modification
- Westerbork Synthesis Radio Telescope
