= Heeii =

Heeii, formerly known as Elkoog B.V., is a company based in Groningen, Netherlands, which provides a web recommendation service through a browser plug-in. The service recommends links and other web content to users based on their online activity and inferred interests.

== Technology ==
Heeii's technology combines elements of human–computer interaction research and software engineering to analyse patterns of user behaviour on the web. The system uses implicit behavioural data to infer users' interests and recommend content based on patterns observed among users with similar browsing behaviour.

The company's approach has been associated with concepts discussed in works such as The Long Tail, The Wisdom of Crowds, and Emergence, particularly those concerning collective behaviour and emergent patterns.

== Passive filtering ==
Heeii employs an implicit filtering approach based on the observation of user behaviour. Rather than relying exclusively on explicit user input, the system collects behavioural data generated through users' interactions with web content and uses this information as part of its recommendation process.

== Company history ==
The company was founded in 2006 by Edwin Kuipers and is headquartered in Groningen, Netherlands. Elkoog initially received approximately $750,000 in angel funding from business associates and personal contacts.

=== Early development and funding ===
By early 2007, the company's concept had demonstrated its feasibility. As Heeii was designed to operate at scale, remain continuously available, and provide rapid responses, the company required additional investment in its technical infrastructure. Elkoog subsequently secured a second round of funding from angel investors, the venture capital fund The Knowledge Conversion Fund, and the ir. G. J. Smid Fund Foundation. This funding round totalled approximately $1.6 million.

By early 2009, the company had raised an additional $2.6 million for marketing activities in the Netherlands and internationally.

=== TARGET collaboration ===
In early 2009, Heeii became a member of the expertise centre TARGET, a collaborative initiative focused on the development of intelligent sensor-network information systems and technologies for the management of large-scale data. The initiative brought together scientific research groups and private-sector organisations to develop scalable systems for data processing, archiving, and analysis, with the aim of translating research into commercial applications.

TARGET was a collaboration between:

- National Astronomical Datacenter OmegaCEN
- University Medical Center Groningen (UMCG)
- Netherlands Institute for Radio Astronomy (ASTRON)
- Artificial Intelligence at the RuG
- Donald Smits Center for Information Technology
- Task24
- Oracle
- IBM
- Heeii
- Target Holding

The University of Groningen served as TARGET's secretariat. The partners developed an innovation programme with a total budget of €32 million, including almost €16 million in planned investment.

== See also ==
- Conversion optimization
- Recommendation system
- Collaborative filtering
