= ASTRON =

Dutch research institute

Coordinates: 52.81333°N 6.39667°E

ASTRON Netherlands Institute for Radio Astronomy
- Formation: April 23, 1949; 77 years ago
- Purpose: Netherlands Institute for Radio Astronomy
- Location: Oude Hoogeveensedijk 4, 7991 PD Dwingeloo, The Netherlands
- Website: www.astron.nl

ASTRON is the Netherlands Institute for Radio Astronomy. Its main office is in Dwingeloo in the Dwingelderveld National Park in the province of Drenthe. ASTRON is part of the institutes organization of the Dutch Research Council (NWO).

== History ==
ASTRON's predecessor organization, Stichting Radiostraling van Zon en Melkweg (SRZM), was founded on 23 April 1949 to build and operate the first radio telescope in Dwingeloo. SRZM oversaw the construction of the Westerbork Synthesis Radio Telescope between 1965 and 1970. The NWO established a new organization, ASTRON, in 1980 to handle other branches of astronomy not covered by SRZM; the two were merged several years later to form the current ASTRON organization.

== Goals ==
ASTRON's main mission is to make discoveries in radio astronomy via the development of new and innovative technologies, the operation of world-class radio astronomy facilities, and the pursuit of fundamental astronomical research in galactic and extra-galactic astronomy. Its main funding comes from NWO.

ASTRON's programme has three principal elements:

- The operation of front line observing facilities, including especially the Westerbork Synthesis Radio Telescope and LOFAR,
- The pursuit of fundamental astronomical research using ASTRON facilities, together with a broad range of other telescopes around the world and space-borne instruments (e.g. Spitzer, HST etc.)
- A strong technology development programme, encompassing both innovative instrumentation for existing telescopes and the new technologies needed for future facilities.

In addition, ASTRON is active in the international science policy arena and is one of the leaders in the international Square Kilometre Array (SKA) project. Built in South Africa and Australia, the SKA will be the world's largest and most sensitive radio telescope with a total collecting area of approximately one square kilometre. The project is a global enterprise bringing together 11 countries from 5 continents.

== Observing facilities ==
=== Radio telescopes ===
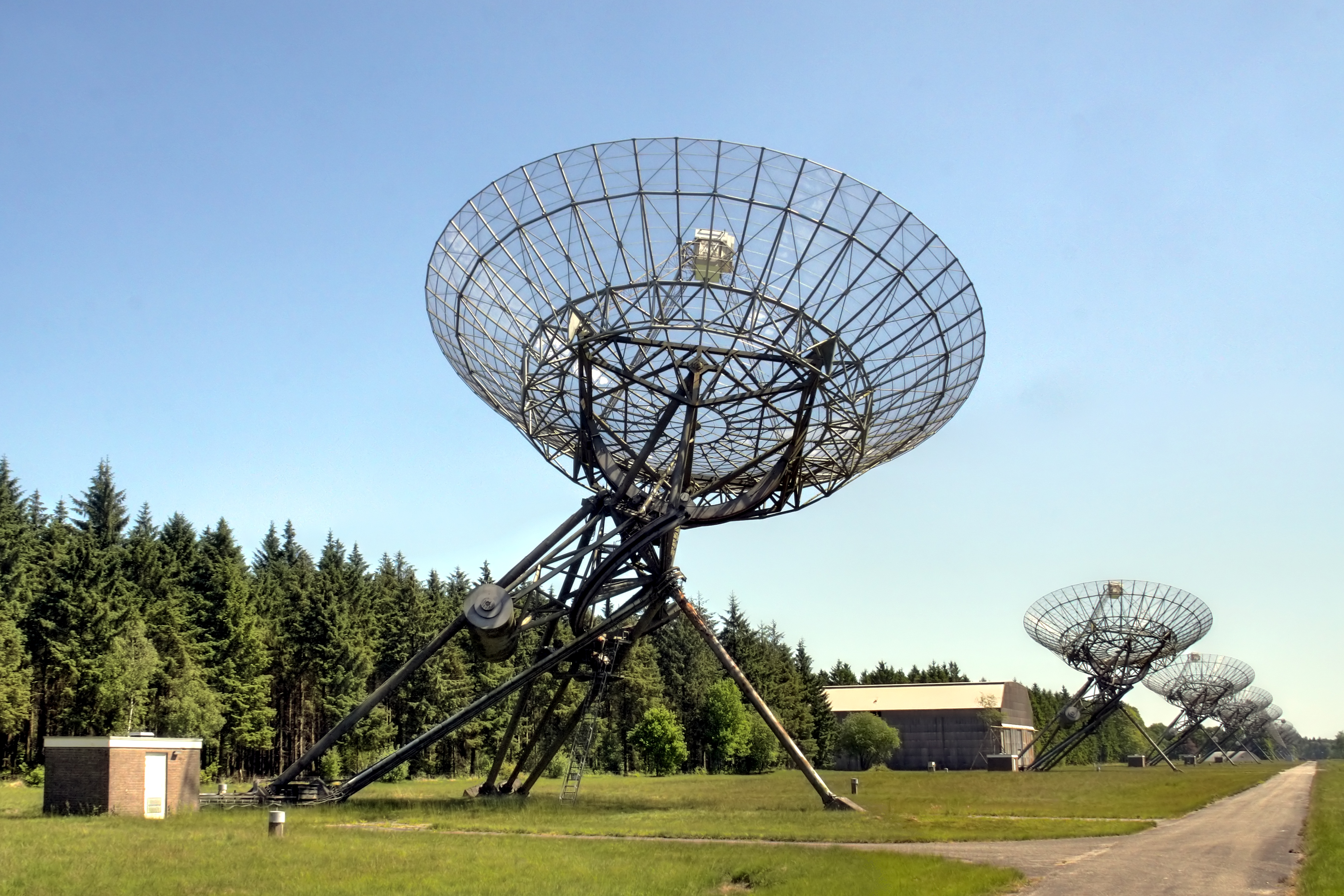
Westerbork Synthesis Radio Telescope in 2010

ASTRON operates the Westerbork Synthesis Radio Telescope (WSRT), one of the largest radio telescopes in the world. The WSRT and the International LOFAR Telescope (ILT) are dedicated to explore the universe at radio frequencies ranging from 10 MHz to 8 GHz.

In addition to its use as a stand-alone radio telescope, the Westerbork array participates in the European Very Long Baseline Interferometry Network (EVN) of radio telescopes.

ASTRON is the host institute for the Joint Institute for VLBI in Europe (JIVE). Its primary task is to operate the EVN MkIV VLBI Data Processor (correlator). JIVE also provides a high-level of support to astronomers and the Telescope Network. ASTRON also hosts the NOVA Optical Infrared (NOVA-OIR) Astronomical Instrumentation Group.

== Technology development ==
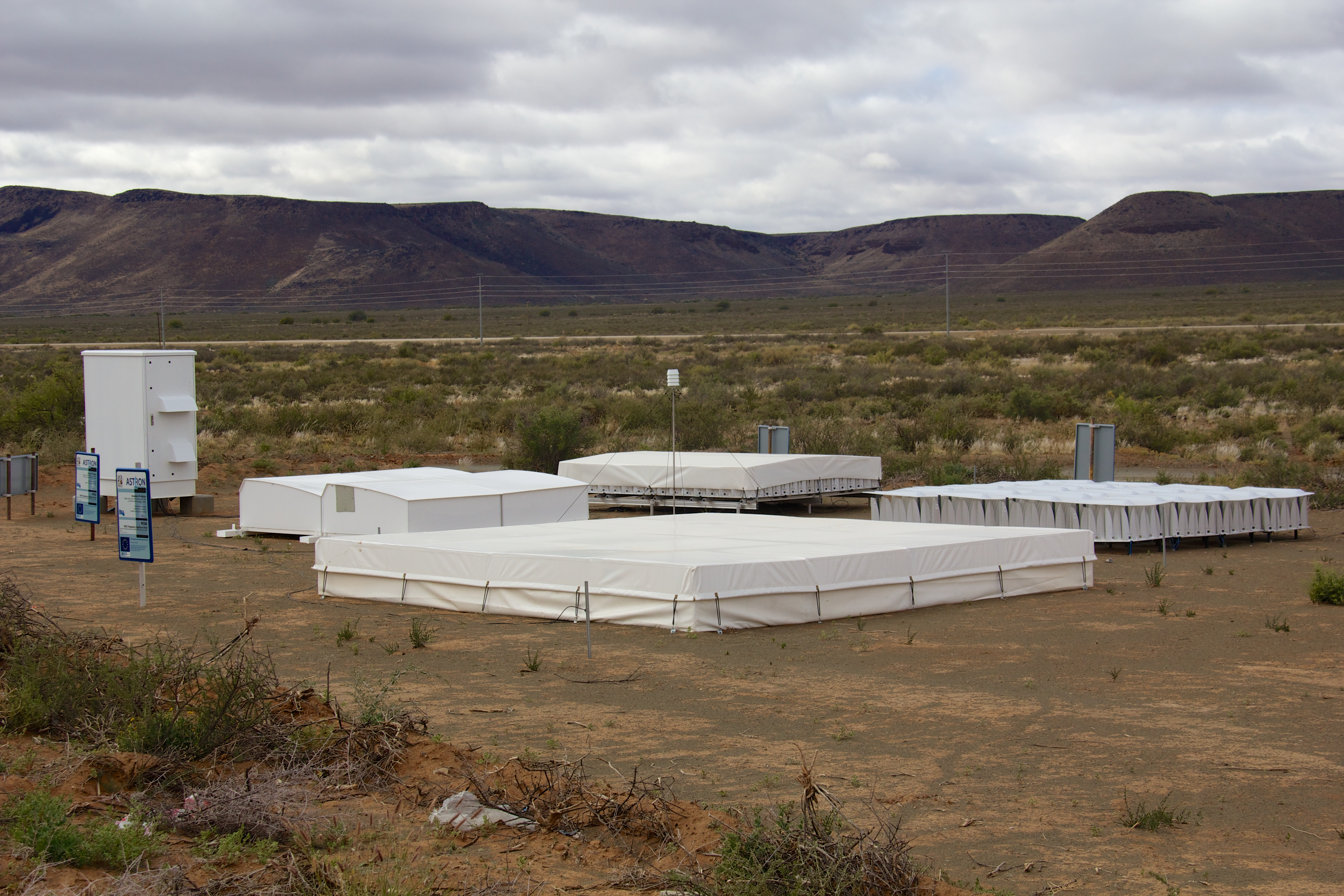
Mid-frequency aperture array test site for the SKA, in South Africa

ASTRON pursues a technical development programme, aimed both at providing innovative instrumentation for use on current observing facilities and at laying the groundwork for future generations of telescopes and signal processing instrumentation.

To these ends, the ASTRON facility in Dwingeloo maintains an equipped R&D division specializing in the design, prototyping and qualification of:

- Low noise, ambient and cryogenic radio receiver systems (0.2–345 GHz)
- Very high speed digital electronics
- Antennas, especially in the array environment
- Advanced instrumentation for use at optical and infrared wavelengths
- Algorithm and software engineering for instrument control and for imaging

== See also ==
- Joeri van Leeuwen
