= AARD =

AARD may refer to:

- AARD code, a segment of code in a beta release of Microsoft Windows 3.1
- Alanine and arginine-rich domain-containing protein, encoded by the AARD gene
- Angat Afterbay Regulator Dam, in the Philippines

== See also ==
- Aard el Borj, a mountain of southern Lebanon
- Ter Aard, a village in Assen municipality, Drenthe, the Netherlands
