= Marienkamp Abbey =

Church building in Assen, Netherlands

Coordinates: 52.9933°N 6.5639°E

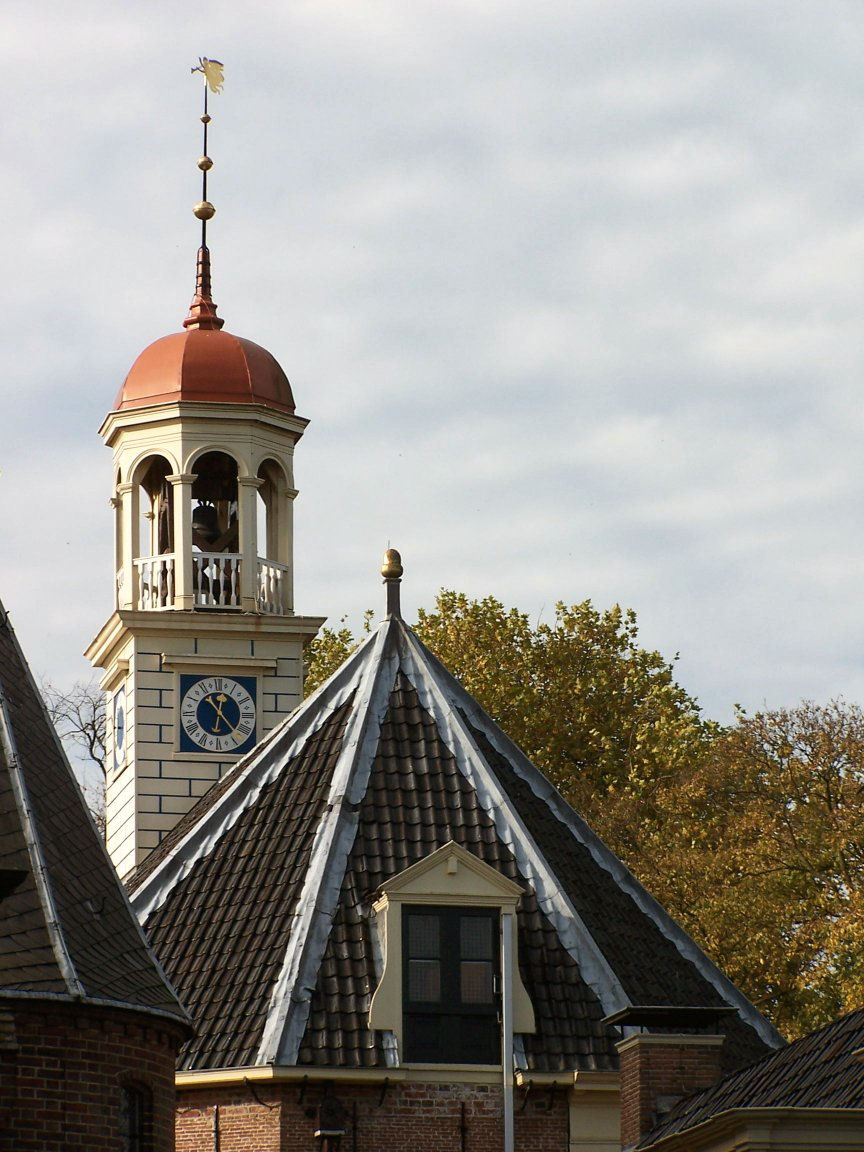
Abbey church

Marienkamp Abbey (Dutch: Klooster Mariënkamp; Latin: Maria in Campis) was a Cistercian nunnery in the present province of Drenthe in the Netherlands.

== History ==
The abbey was founded in 1215 in Coevorden, later moved to Deurze near Rolde, accepted by the Cistercians in 1246, and moved again, to the present Assen, in 1258. The abbey gave rise to the village of Assen (which was not a town until the 19th century). It was devastated by a fire in 1418. In 1460 it joined the Trinitarian Order.

The community ceased to exist during the Protestant Reformation, around 1596; its formal dissolution took place in 1602. In 1601 the church tower collapsed, and badly damaged the church, which was rebuilt in 1662: of the mediaeval structure only the south wall remained.

In 1848 the church was sold to the municipality, which used it as a community centre. Since 1982 it has been used as part of the Drents Museum.

== Bibliography ==
- Anselme Dimier and Ernst Coester: Mittelalterliche Frauenabteien in Frankreich und Benelux. In: Ambrosius Schneider, Adam Wienand, Wolfgang Bicker, Ernst Coester (eds.): Die Cistercienser. Geschichte – Geist – Kunst. 3rd edn. Wienand Verlag, Köln 1986, p. 709. ISBN 3-87909-132-3
- Maria M. de Bakker: De abdij Mariënkamp. In: Nieuwe Drentse Volksalmanak, vol. 77 (1959).
