= Assen =

City and municipality in Drenthe, Netherlands

- City and municipality
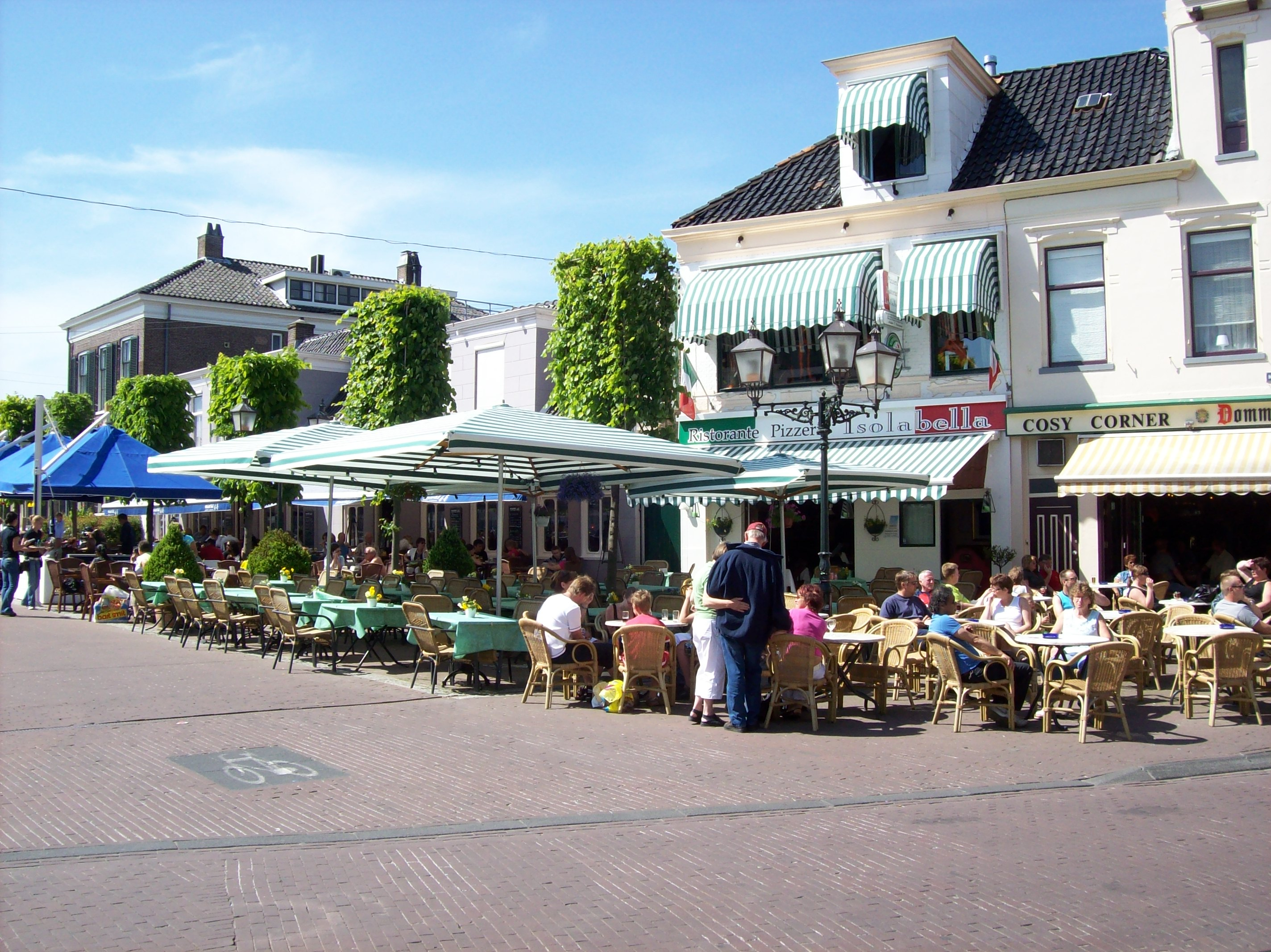
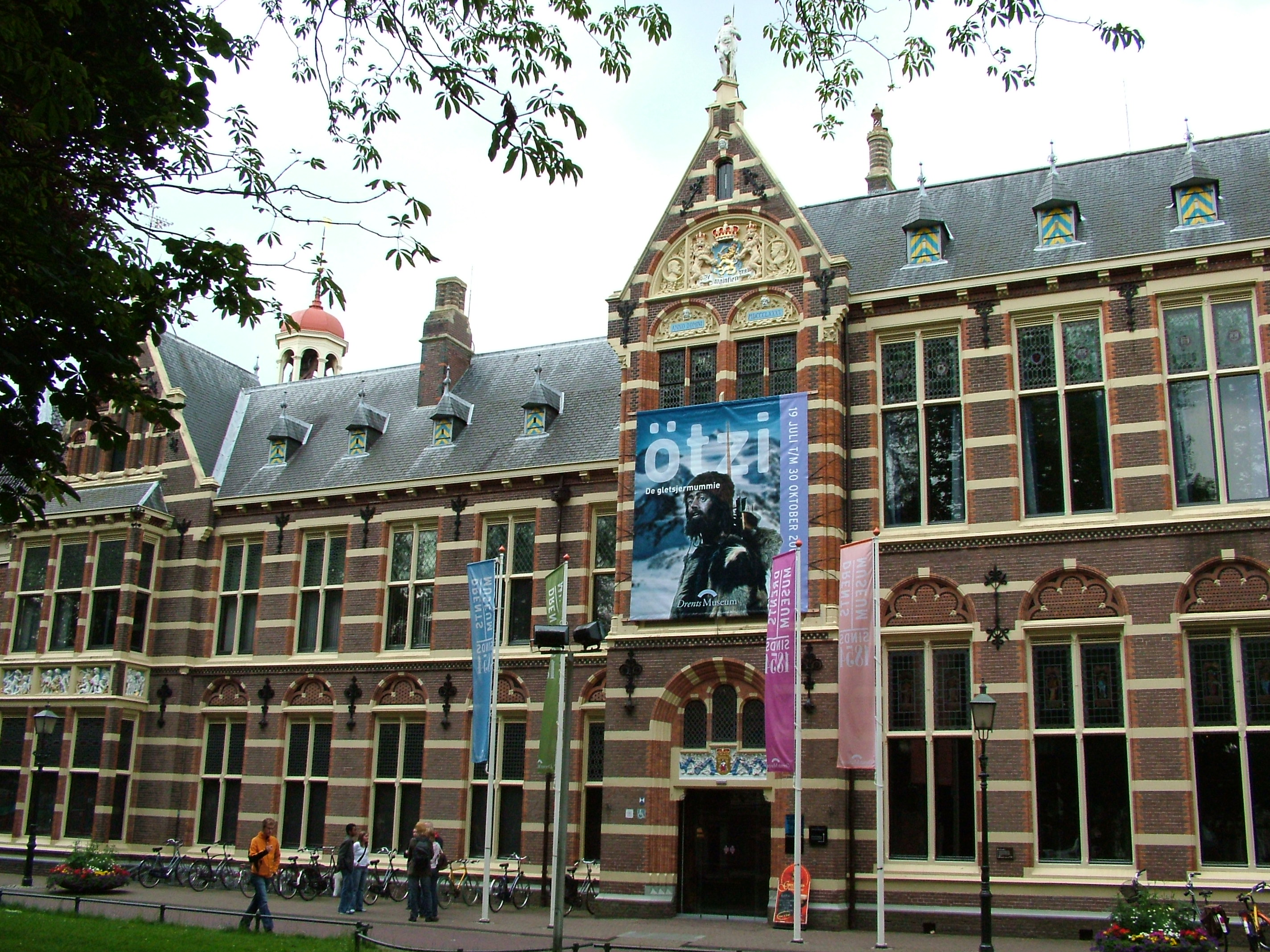
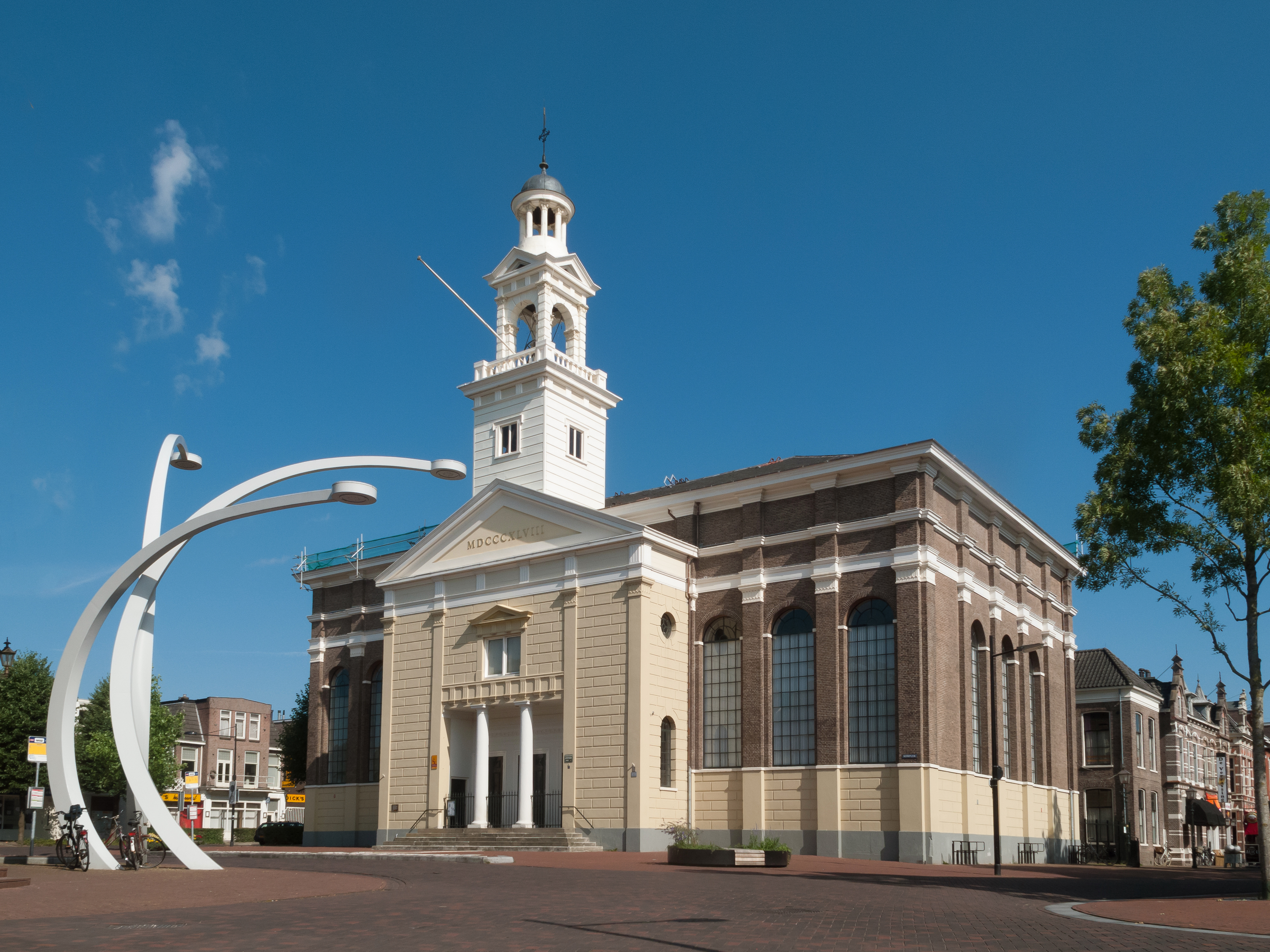
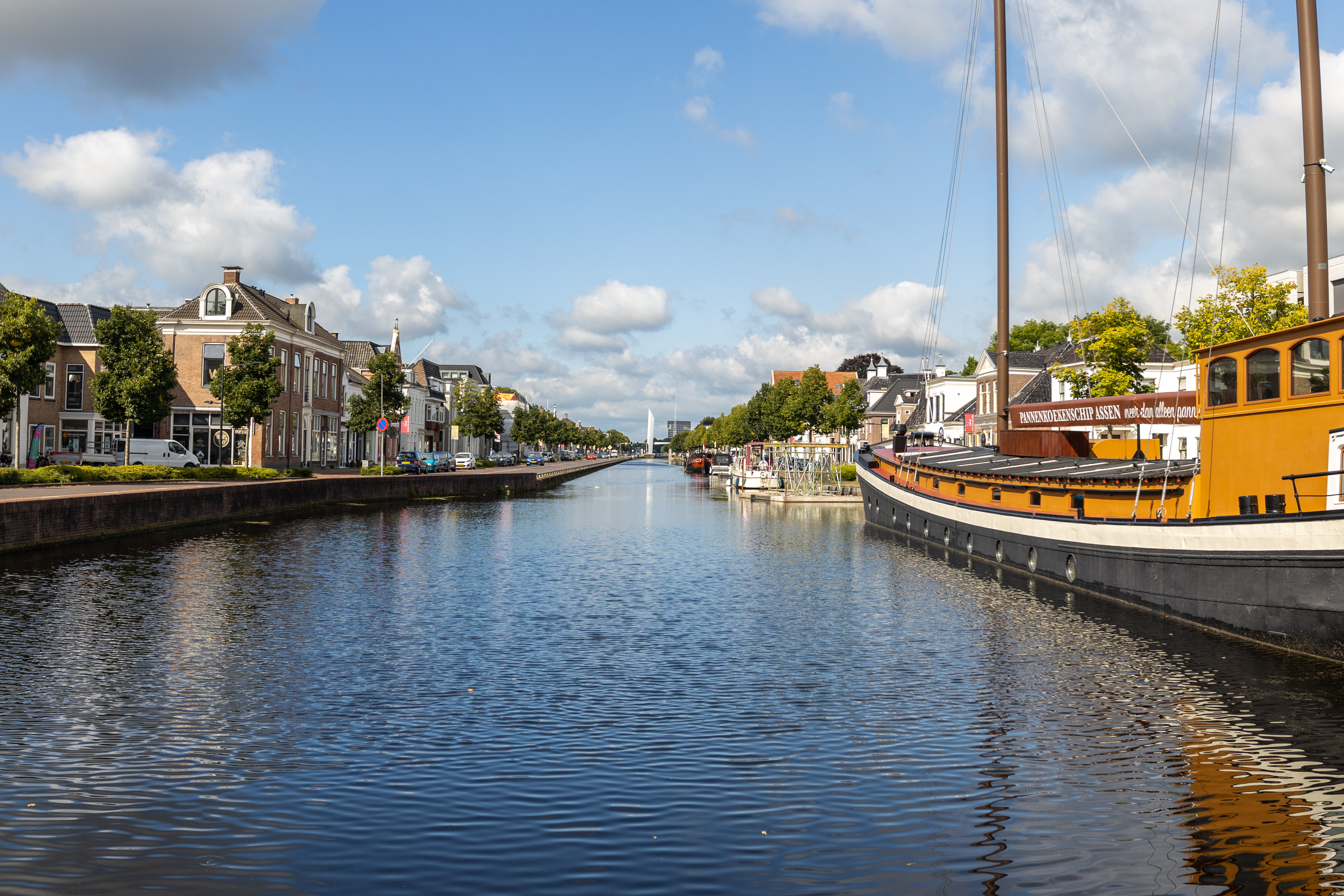
- Market square in the city center Drents Museum Jozefkerk Canal De Vaart

- Flag Coat of arms Brandmark

- Location in Drenthe

- Location within the Netherlands Location within Europe
- Coordinates: 52°59′43″N 6°33′38″E
- Country: Netherlands
- Province: Drenthe

Government
  - Body: Municipal council
  - Mayor: Marco Out

Area
  - Total: 83.45 km^{2} (32.22 sq mi)
  - Land: 81.89 km^{2} (31.62 sq mi)
  - Water: 1.56 km^{2} (0.60 sq mi)
- Elevation: 10 m (33 ft)

Population (January 2026)
  - Total: 70,769
  - Density: 864/km^{2} (2,240/sq mi)
- Demonyms: Assenaar, Asser
- Time zone: UTC+1 (CET)
  - Summer (DST): UTC+2 (CEST)
- Postcodes: 9400–9409, 9486–9489, 9492
- Area code: 0592
- Website: www.assen.nl

Assen (Dutch: [ˈɑsə(n)]) is a city and municipality in the Northeastern Netherlands, and is the capital of the province of Drenthe. It received city rights in 1809. Assen is known for TT Circuit Assen, the motorcycle racing circuit, where on the last Sunday in June the Dutch TT is run; and also for the annual Assen Dance Festival.

Assen won the European Green Leaf Award for 2027.

== Population centres ==
Anreep, Assen, De Haar, Graswijk, Loon, Rhee, Schieven, Ter Aard, Ubbena, Witten, Zeijerveen, and Zeijerveld.

== History ==
The history of the capital of Drenthe can be traced back to at least 1258, when a new location had to be found for Marienkamp Abbey, which had originally been built near Coevorden as a penalty for the slaughter in 1227 of the army of the Bishop of Utrecht at the hands of Drenthe's peasants, in what has come to be known as the Battle of Ane – a battle, incidentally, in which the bishop was killed. His successor ordered the nunnery to be built as a penalty. As it was located in a barren peat area, which also happened to flood from time to time, a better location had to be found. A better and especially drier spot for the Cistercian abbey was found in an area known as Witten, where at the time only a few farms were located. Around it was village communities like Deurze, Witten and Peelo. The latter has a history which goes back to the times when Dolmens were built, but it is now situated between two new districts of Assen. The "relocated" abbey probably was erected in the 1260s, and over the centuries Assen developed around it.

=== Abbey ===
The abbey was built at what now is the Brink (i.e., the grassy area which serves as a symbolic municipal centre) of Assen. On the abbey site now stands the Drents Museum, which was built in 1882 as provinciehuis (i.e., the residence of the provincial government). Only the abdijkerk (abbey church), the grounds, and bits and pieces of walls remind us of the religious beginnings of the city.

=== Coat of arms ===
The coat of arms is directly borrowed from the seal of the abbey. It is just like the coat of arms of the province of Drenthe - in both cases Mary with child - but Jesus switches to the other knee. The history of the city is connected with the provincial governing board: around 1600, the abbey property was secularised. Marienkamp no longer existed, but the buildings did. Because of the central position of Assen and the fact that the government from what was then called de Landschap Drenthe (the Landscape Drenthe) was searching for a location for the government and civil servants, Assen became the seat for, and thus practically also the capital of Drenthe.

=== Drents Haagje ===
Assen was not a municipality yet, not even in ecclesiastical sense. Even though there was an abbey church, Assen fell ecclesiastically and administratively under Rolde. In 1615 Assen got its preacher. In 1807 Assen administratively freed itself from the control of Rolde when the village got to establish its own municipal authorities. A municipal authority which, moreover, in most cases, operated in the shadow of the provincial government, which always manifested itself prominently in the Drentse Haagje. The municipal authority mainly got there because of provincial governors like Governor Petrus Hofstede, to which the city also thanks its uniquely located park (in the center of the city). From that time, Assen also obtained its nickname het Herenbolwerk.

=== City rights ===
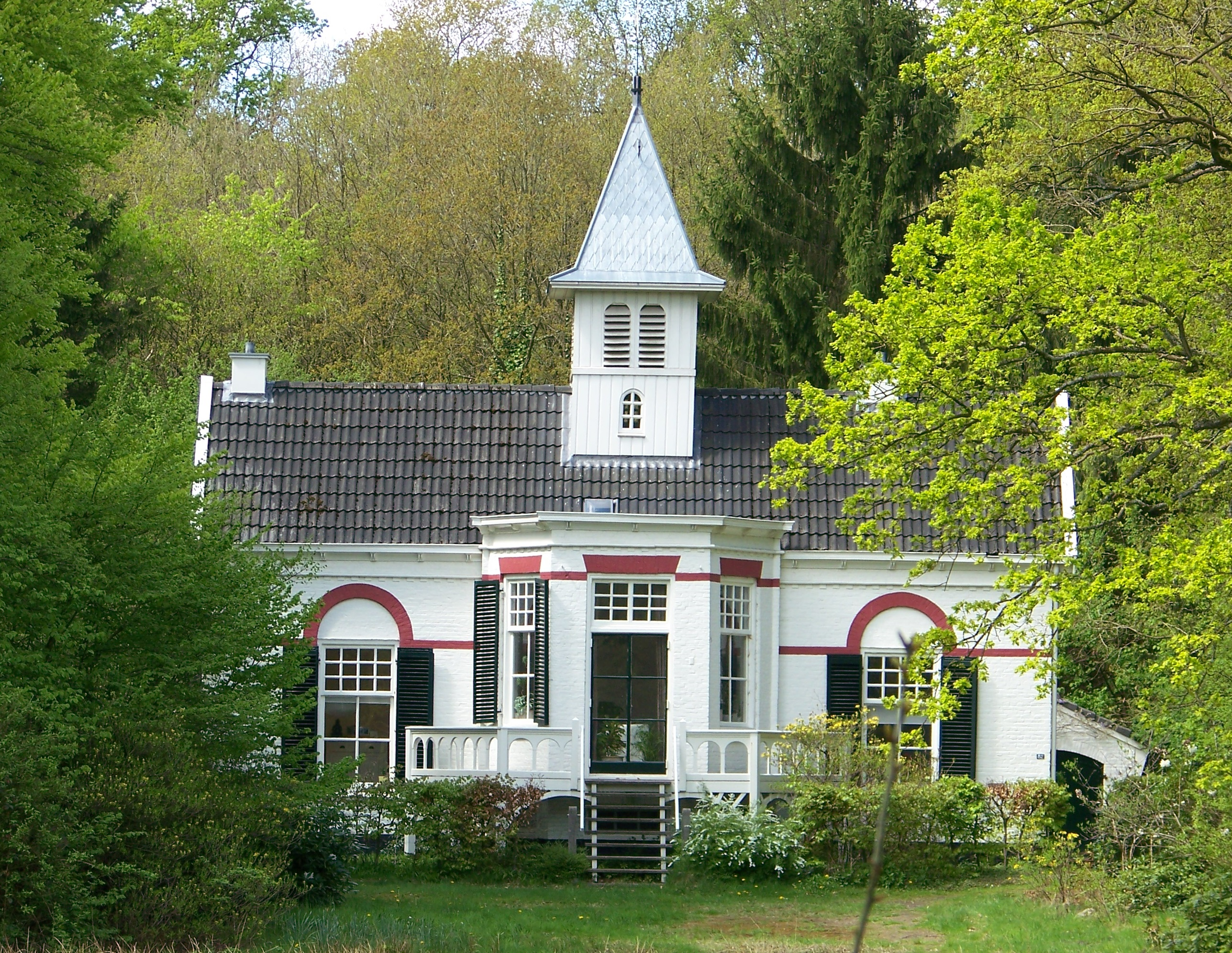
De Eerste Steen, a typical early 20th-century estate

Assen has been an official city since 1809. After Coevorden, then a village of about sixteen hundred people, Assen became the second place in Drenthe with city rights, granted by King Louis Napoleon, who had big plans for the village. A plan to make it a city was set up at the time, but the Kingdom of the Netherlands was incorporated into Napoleon Bonaparte's French Empire, and the plans were abandoned.

As an administrative centre, Assen attracted well-to-do inhabitants and new enterprises and initiatives. These contributed to a slow but steady increase of commerce, wealth and new establishments; such a newspaper in 1823, a Latin school in 1825, a postal service on Groningen in 1830, a court in 1840, the establishment of a military garrison in 1852 and a railway station in 1870. Another major achievement was the canal Drentse Hoofdvaart, which was used to transport peat and other goods; the Noord-Willemskanaal was opened in 1861. The most important monuments of the city are from the nineteenth century.

=== Industry ===
Around 1900 Assen began to play a more prominent industrial role. It was originally a centre of civil servants, but the establishment of a slaughterhouse, dairy factory and iron foundry created more diverse expansion opportunities and encouraged growth. Around 1930, by establishing various psychiatric hospitals and healthcare centres, Assen became a central point for health care in the province.

=== Growth ===
After the Second World War, Assen did not have more than 20,000 inhabitants. The Assen TT made the city more widely known, but it was not until the 1950s, with the development of an industrial core, did Assen begin to grow more quickly. The Nederlandse Aardolie Maatschappij (Dutch Oil Company) established itself in the city, and with that, a trend was set. Now, Assen is known not only because of its TT, Bartje and the Drentse Rijwielvierdaagse. It also is the fastest-growing city in the northern part of the Netherlands, with ample employment opportunities, particularly in the service industry.The city's unprecedented growth in houses and inhabitants is taking place, with environmental issues becoming more urgent.

The Assen railway station connects the city to the rest of the country. Assen's city centre is closed to through motor traffic (except emergency vehicles), it has an extensive network of off-road cycle paths, and 41% of all journeys in Assen are by bicycle. The city has progressively become more cycle friendly since the 1960s.

== Tourism, culture and sport ==
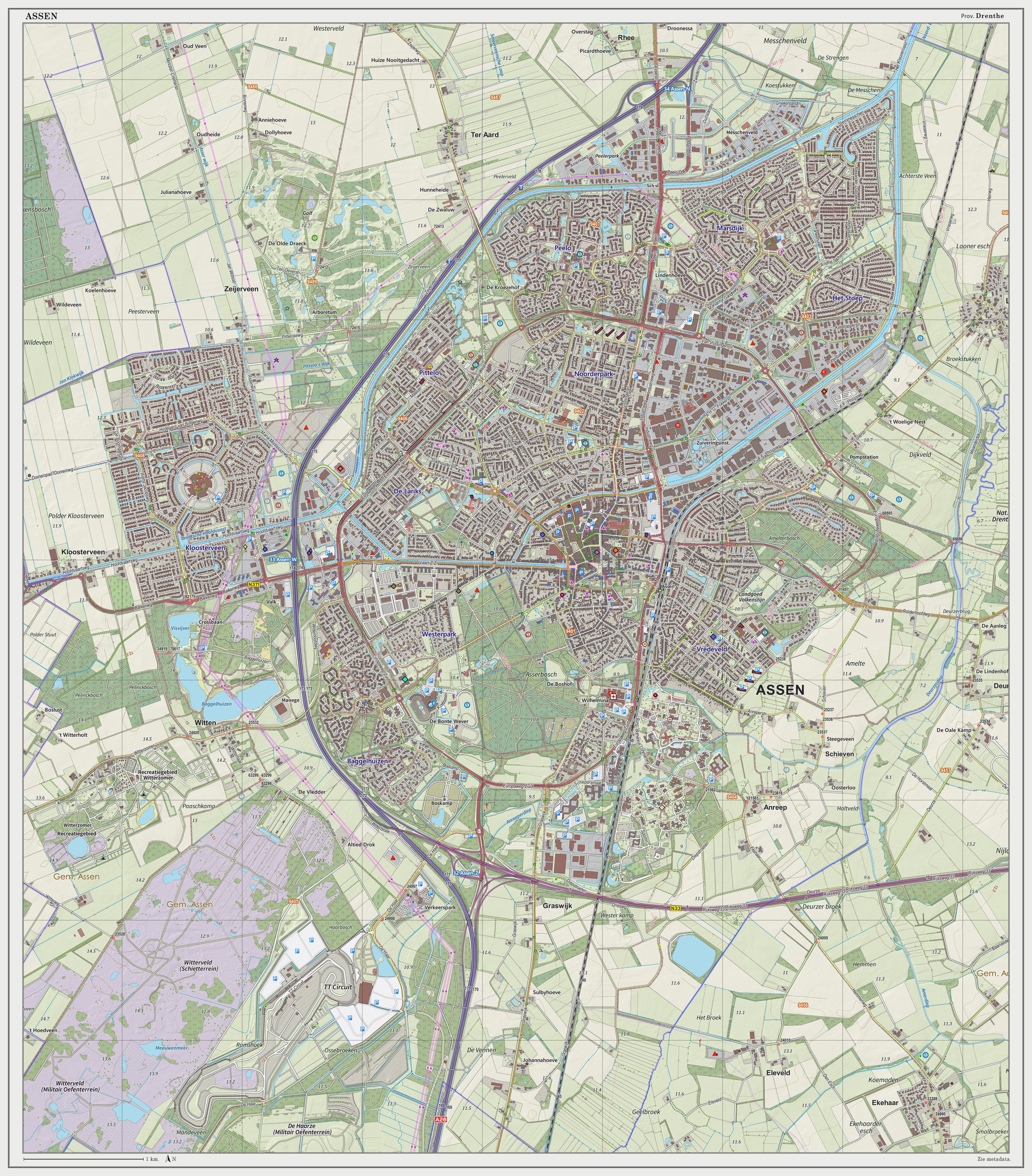
Topographic map of Assen, Sept. 2014

=== Tourist Trophy ===
The TT Circuit Assen is one of the most famous motorcycle racing circuits in the world and is the only circuit that has been in the MotoGP calendar since its beginnings in 1949. It is also regarded as the "Cathedral of Motorcycle Racing."

=== Drents Museum ===
The Drents Museum provides a view of the world and of Drenthe, with stories about archaeology, art and history.

=== The Yde Girl ===
Before her execution, one half of this girl's head was shaved. She was only sixteen, about 140 cm tall and she had blond hair. Around the beginning of the Common Era, this adolescent was strangled with a woolen band which the executioner had wrapped around her neck three times. Possibly, she was also stabbed in the neck near the left collarbone. She rested in the peat bog near the village of Yde for almost two thousand years, until two workers discovered her in May 1897 - and then ran away in fright. Days later most of her body parts and fragments of a cloak were dredged up from the peat. Unfortunately, the villagers had also heard about this find. They had secretly removed nearly all her teeth and tore off most of her hair.

=== Dance ===
In November of each year Assen becomes the centre of international attention for the world of Ballroom and Latin American dancers when the city hosts the Assen Dance Festival which includes the Dutch Open Championships. This is an open event for dancers from all countries.

=== Cycling ===
Assen is also the capital of the "cycling province" of the Netherlands, Drenthe. There are many high quality cycle paths in the city and surroundings and it is host to regular cycling events such as the Drentse fietsvierdaagse and the Jeugdtour. In 2009 the prologue and opening stage of the Vuelta a España took place in Assen.

The city has twice hosted the International Six Days Enduro.

=== Association football ===
Asser Christelijke Voetbalvereniging was founded in 1939 and is one of the most successful amateur clubs in Dutch football.

== Education ==
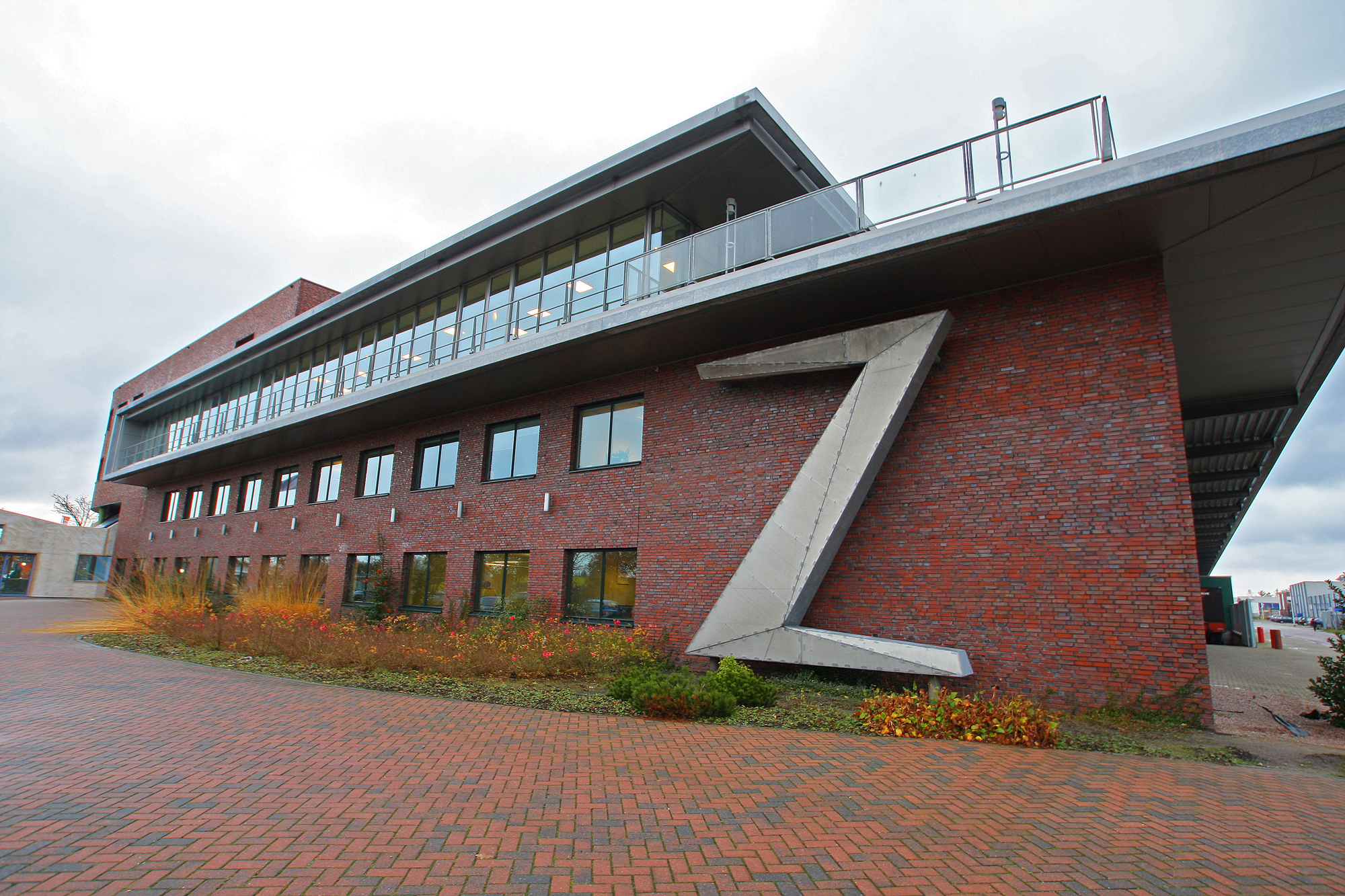
Hanze Institute of Technology

The city of Assen is home to the Dutch secondary vocational education (MBO) of Drenthe College. Some of the programmes offered by this vocational school are "Car technician", "First Car Engineer" and "First motorcycle technician", all due to the strong connections between DC and the TT Circuit Assen. About 8,000 students work across the three faculties in the city of Assen, as well as few others in Meppel and Emmen.

Assen also hosts one faculty of the Hanze University of Applied Sciences, more specifically the Hanze Institute of Technology. About 100 university students are located here, some from the Bachelor of Electrical and Electronic Engineering and some from the Master Course of Smart Systems Engineering.

The difference between the two institutions is that the former is only given in Dutch and is more "work in the field" orientated. Meanwhile, the latter is an international university of AS that provides Bachelors's and Masters's studies in English (see education in the Netherlands).

== International relations ==
Assen is twinned with:

- Poznań, Poland

== Notable people born in Assen ==
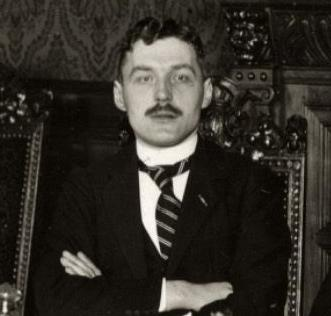
Jan Donner, 1926

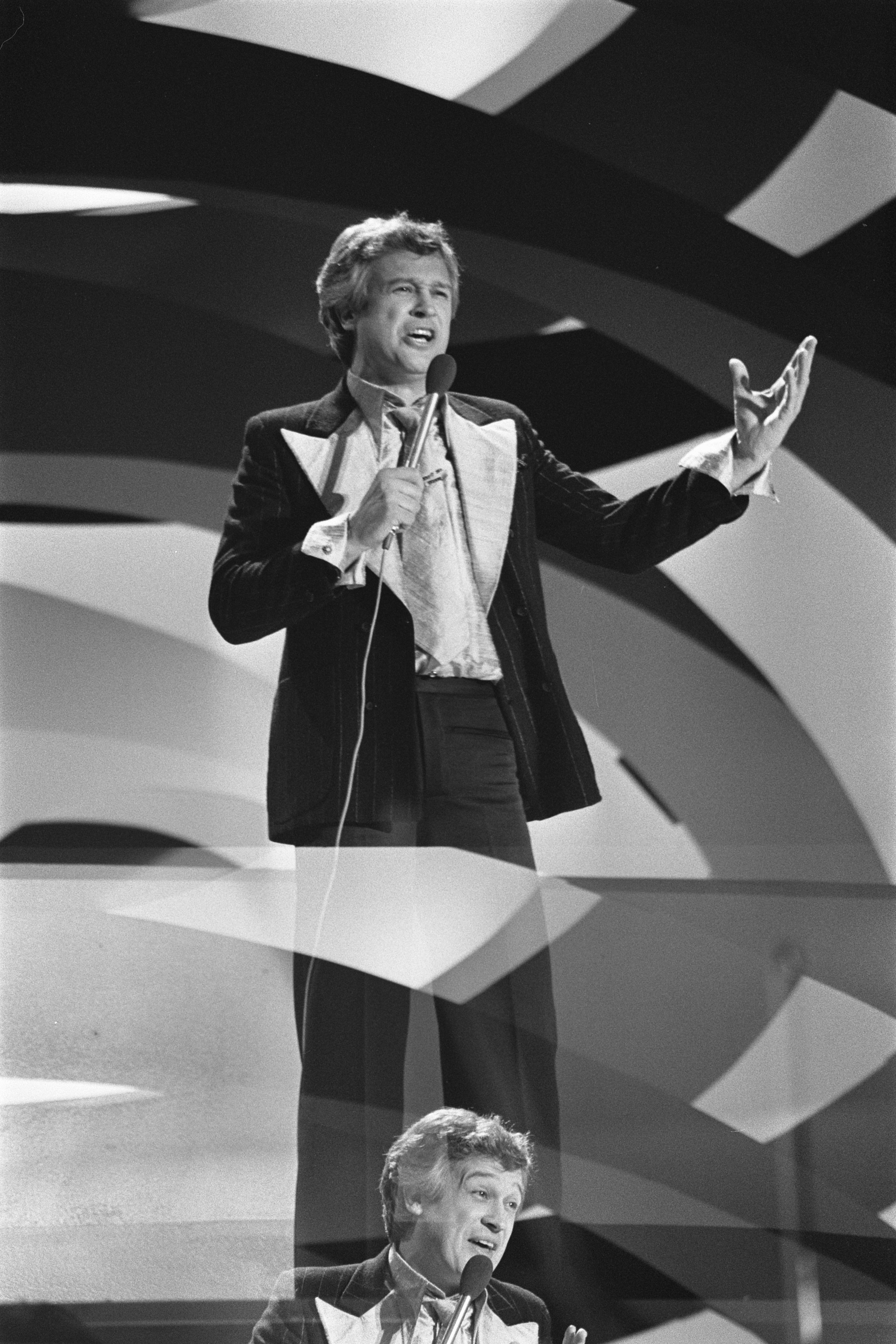
Dick Rienstra, 1977

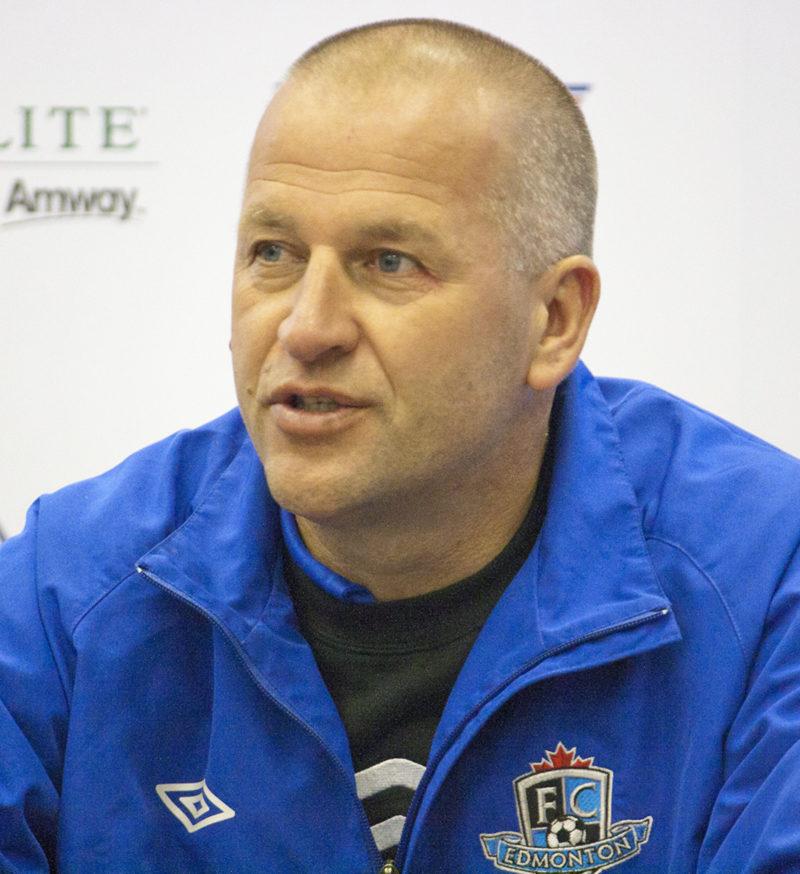
Harry Sinkgraven, 2011

- Johannes Alberti (1698 in Assen – 1762) a theologian
- Hendrik Jan Smidt (1831 in Assen – 1917) Governor-General of Suriname 1885 to 1888
- Tettje Clay-Jolles (1881 in Assen – 1972) one of the first female Dutch physicists
- Jo van de Kieft (1884 – 1970 in Assen) a politician and businessman
- Jan Donner (1891 in Assen – 1981) a politician
- Johannes Linthorst Homan (1903 in Assen – 1986) a politician and diplomat
- Anne de Vries (1904 in Kloosterveen – 1964) a teacher and author
- Henk Feldmeijer (1910 in Assen – 1945) a Dutch Nazi
- Jacob Staal (1913 in Assen - 1981) a commando during World War II
- Wim Franken (1922 in Assen - 2012) a composer, pianist and carillonneur
- Dick Rienstra (1941 in Assen - 2021) a singer and actor
- Relus ter Beek (1944 in Coevorden – 2008) a politician
- Erik Ziengs (born 1960 in Hoogersmilde) a politician and businessman
- John-Paul Langbroek (born 1961 in Assen) an Australian politician
- Juul Kraijer (born 1970 in Assen) a visual artist who uses drawing and photography

=== Sport ===
- Eppie Wietzes (1938 in Assen–2020) a Canadian Formula 1 driver
- Johan Bontekoe (1943 in Assen–2006) a freestyle swimmer, competed in the 1964 Summer Olympics
- Klenie Bimolt (born 1945 in Assen) a former breaststroke swimmer, silver medallist at the 1964 Summer Olympics
- Egbert Streuer (born 1954 in Assen) a former professional sidecar driver
- Harry Sinkgraven (born 1966) a football coach and former footballer with 334 club caps
- Peter Hoekstra (born 1973 in Assen) retired footballer with 273 club caps
- Bas Roorda (born 1973 in Assen) a football player with 280 club caps
- Timothy Beck (born 1977 in Assen) a sprinter and bobsledder, competed in the 2004 Summer Olympics and in the 2002 Winter Olympics
- Sergio van Dijk (born 1982 in Assen) a Dutch-Indonesian football player, over 330 club caps
- Marc de Maar (born 1984 in Assen) a professional cyclist, Quick-Step
- Boy Westerhof (born 1985 in Assen) a professional tennis player
- Inge Dekker (born 1985 in Assen) a former butterfly and freestyle swimmer, bronze medallist at the 2004 Summer Olympics
- Brian Kamstra (born 1993 in Assen) a professional cyclist, Team Novo Nordisk
- Maike van der Duin (born 2001 in Assen) a professional cyclist, Le Col–Wahoo
