= Ubbena =

- Hamlet
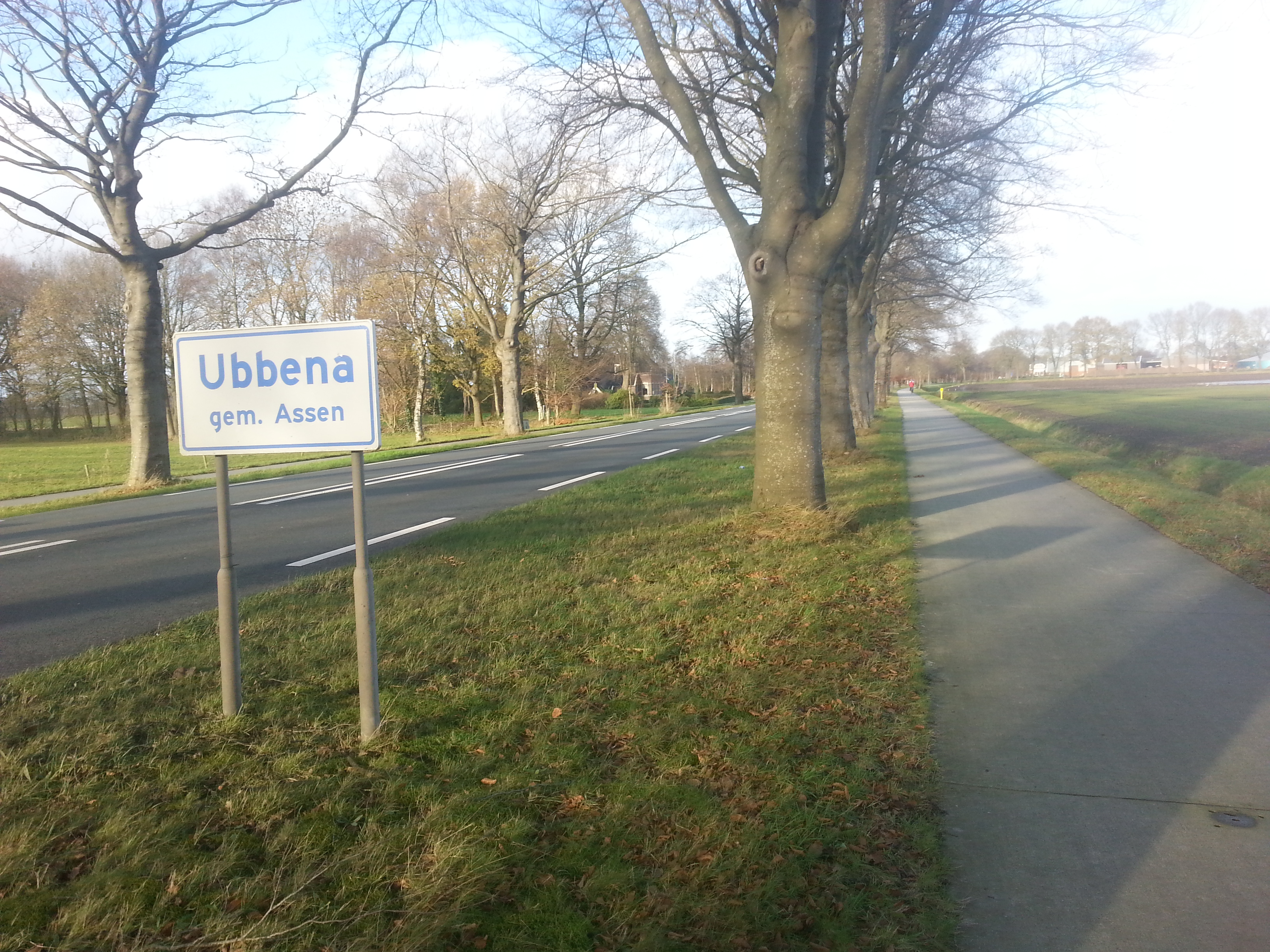
- Town limits

- Location in province of Drenthe in the Netherlands Ubbena (Netherlands)
- Coordinates: 53°2′40″N 6°34′26″E
- Country: Netherlands
- Province: Drenthe
- Municipality: Assen

Area
  - Total: 7.02 km^{2} (2.71 sq mi)
- Elevation: 10 m (33 ft)

Population (2021)
  - Total: 170
  - Density: 24/km^{2} (63/sq mi)
- Time zone: UTC+1 (CET)
  - Summer (DST): UTC+2 (CEST)
- Postal code: 9492
- Dialing code: 0592

Ubbena is a hamlet in the Netherlands, and is part of the Assen municipality in Drenthe.

Ubbena is a statistical entity, and has its own postal code, however it is considered part of Zeijen. It was first mentioned in 1660, and means "the descendants of Ubbo". The Ubbena estate dated from the mid-17th century, and later became an inn along the main road.
