= Rhee, Netherlands =

Rhee
- Hamlet
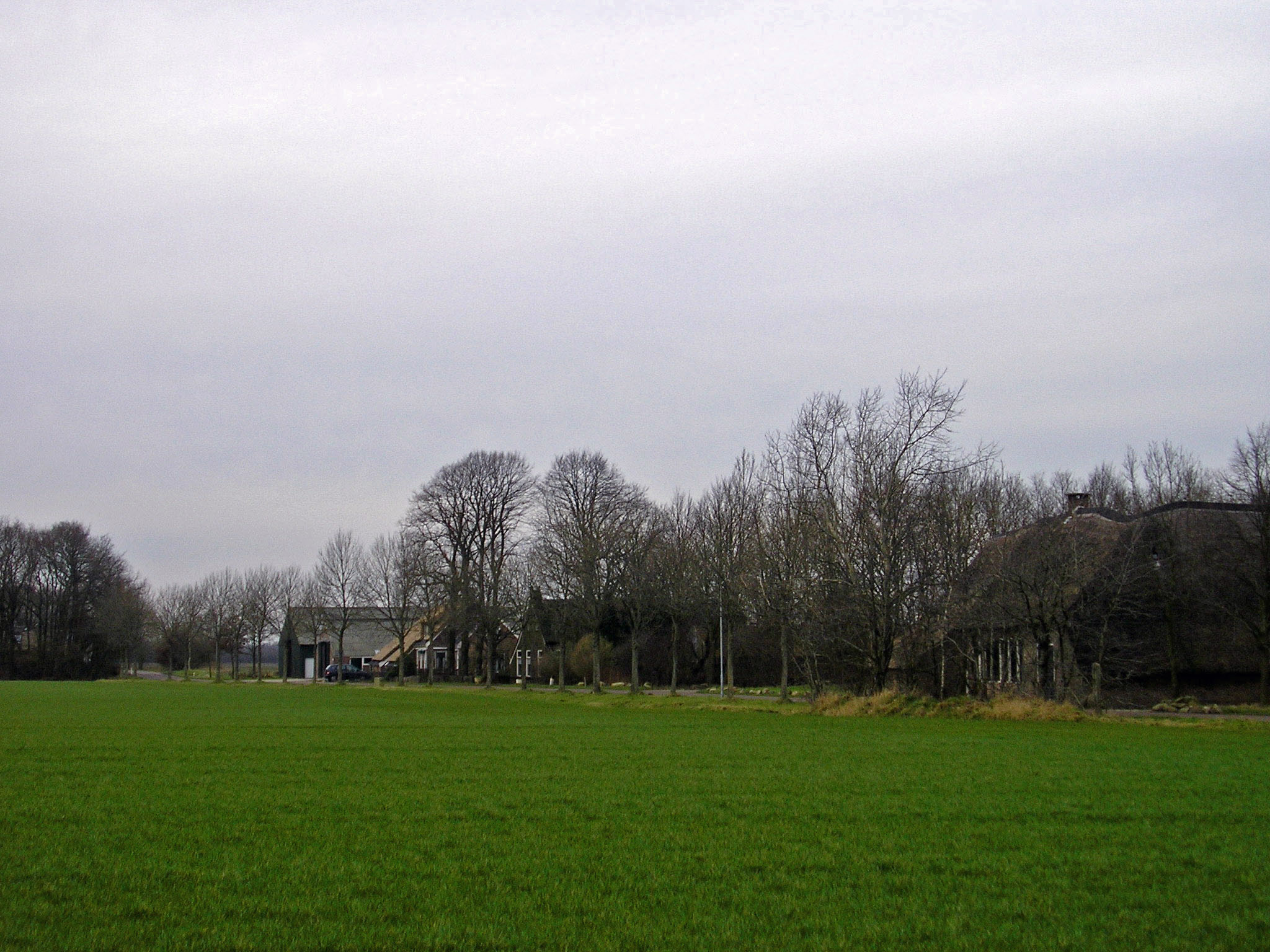
- View of Rhee

- Location in province of Drenthe in the Netherlands Rhee (Netherlands)
- Coordinates: 53°1′56″N 6°33′58″E
- Country: Netherlands
- Province: Drenthe
- Municipality: Assen

Area
  - Total: 1.97 km^{2} (0.76 sq mi)
- Elevation: 12 m (39 ft)

Population (2021)
  - Total: 40
  - Density: 20/km^{2} (53/sq mi)
- Time zone: UTC+1 (CET)
  - Summer (DST): UTC+2 (CEST)
- Postal code: 9486
- Dialing code: 0592

Rhee is a hamlet in the Netherlands and is part of the Assen municipality in Drenthe.

Rhee is a statistical entity, and has its own postal code, however it is considered part of Zeijen. It is first mentioned in the 1380s as Rede and means "borderline". In 1382, Reinoud IV of Coevorden sold its possessions in Rhee to the monastery of Assen. In 1840, it was home to 18 people.
