= Tour de junior =

Bicycle race in Achterveld, Netherlands

The Tour de Junior, is an annual bicycle race in Achterveld, Netherlands. The race is for young riders, from age 12 to 16. It is a kind of little Tour de France for kids. It is held during the summer break, lasting for 6 consecutive days. There are 9 stages, with road races and time trials. The oldest youth tour of Holland, it is ridden by the rules of the Koninklijke Nederlandsche Wielren Unie.

== History ==
The Tour de Junior was ridden for the first time in 1958, making it the oldest youthtour of Holland. The first time the tour went international was in 1962, being probably the first youthtour organised in Europe. Since 1960 the tour has to deal with a competitor, the Youthtour Assen. Nowadays the Youthtour Assen is a bigger event than the Tour de Junior, with more participants.

The tour was founded by Jan Schouten and since 1958 there have been only 3 other leaders. The current tourleader is Hein Ossendrijver, who took over from his father in 2001. The Tour de Junior has had a lot of participants that became professional cyclists, including but not limited to Hennie Kuiper, Michael Boogerd, Hennie Stamsnijder, Erik Dekker and Nicole Cooke

In 2011 Michael Boogerd went to the 54th Tour de Junior and gave the first starting shot.

== Organisation ==
The tour is organised by a union connected with the Koninklijke Nederlandsche Wielren Unie. During the week the participants stay in Achterveld. They can choose to stay with a local family, or go to the tourcamping. Many volunteers work during the tour. There is a first aid, and during the races the riders are guided by motorriders and the police makes sure nobody enters the course.

== Stages ==
The Tour de Junior consists of 9 stages. The distance of each stage depends on what category the participants are in. On Monday the tour starts with a omloop, a large lap of at least 4 kilometers. On Tuesday morning everyone rides to a hill together for a up hill time trial of 1 kilometer. In the evening there is a street race with laps of 1500 meters. On Wednesday there is a classic. Thursday morning starts with yet another up hill time trial. This one is less steep and goes downhill in the end. The evening stage is the same as on the first day. On Friday morning there is a flat time trial of 4.5 kilometers with a lot of wind. The evening stage is the same as the Tuesday evening stage. The last day there is a critirium on a course with small laps of only 890 meters.

== Jerseys ==
The leader in a classification get to wear jerseys. A yellow jersey is for the overall classification, a polka dot jersey for the fastest over the up hill time trials, a pink jersey for the best classified girl in the Under 14 category (a combination of under 14 boys and under 16 girls) and a green jersey for the participant who has won the most points in the sprints.
