= Jacob Staal =

Jacob "Jaap" Staal (8 July 1913, Assen - 1981?) was a Dutch commando during World War II. He fought in Operation Market Garden in 1944. In recognition of his services, Staal was decorated with the Dutch Bronze Lion and the American Medal of Freedom with bronze palm.

Following the German occupation of the Netherlands in 1940, Staal left for England, where he joined the British regiment Queen's Own Dorset Yeomanry, seconded to the Special Operations Executive (SOE). In 1944 Staal, now a lieutenant, trained for Operation Jedburgh with fellow Dutch officers Arie Bestebreurtje, Henk Brinkgreve and Jacobus Groenewoud. Operation Jedburgh involved allied agents being parachuted behind enemy lines to conduct sabotage and guerrilla actions and organize local resistance groups.

During Operation Market Garden, Staal commanded a five-men Jedburgh team codenamed "Edward". Staal, now a captain, was the only Dutch member of his team, the others were British and American. The team landed by glider near corps headquarters outside Groesbeek on 17 September 1944. Team Edward's task was to organize and support the local resistance, serve as liaison between the Allied airborne troops and the Dutch resistance, gather tactical intelligence and maintain lines of communication between the different Jedburgh teams taking part in Market Garden.

As Market Garden progressed, the "Edward" team moved to Nijmegen. Subsequently, Staal and his team (American Captain McCord Sollenberger, British 2nd Lieutenant Len Willmott and American Technical Sergeant John Billingsley) entered Arnhem, where the British 1st Airborne Division was struggling to survive. The team provided communications for the British division and established an outlet for intelligence from Dutch resistance networks, in extremely difficult conditions.

When the 1st Airborne Division either surrendered or was evacuated from Arnhem, Staal's team had to arrange their own escape. This was done in a notable manner by commandeering a German staff car (a Bentley Vanden Plas which Willmott was able to start without a key). They passed through or forced German checkpoints but were halted by heavy fire from an American patrol. The team returned to London from Brussels on 28 September.

After the end of the war, Staal was promoted to reserve lieutenant colonel of the artillery. In 1947 he emigrated to South Africa.
