= Anreep =

- Hamlet
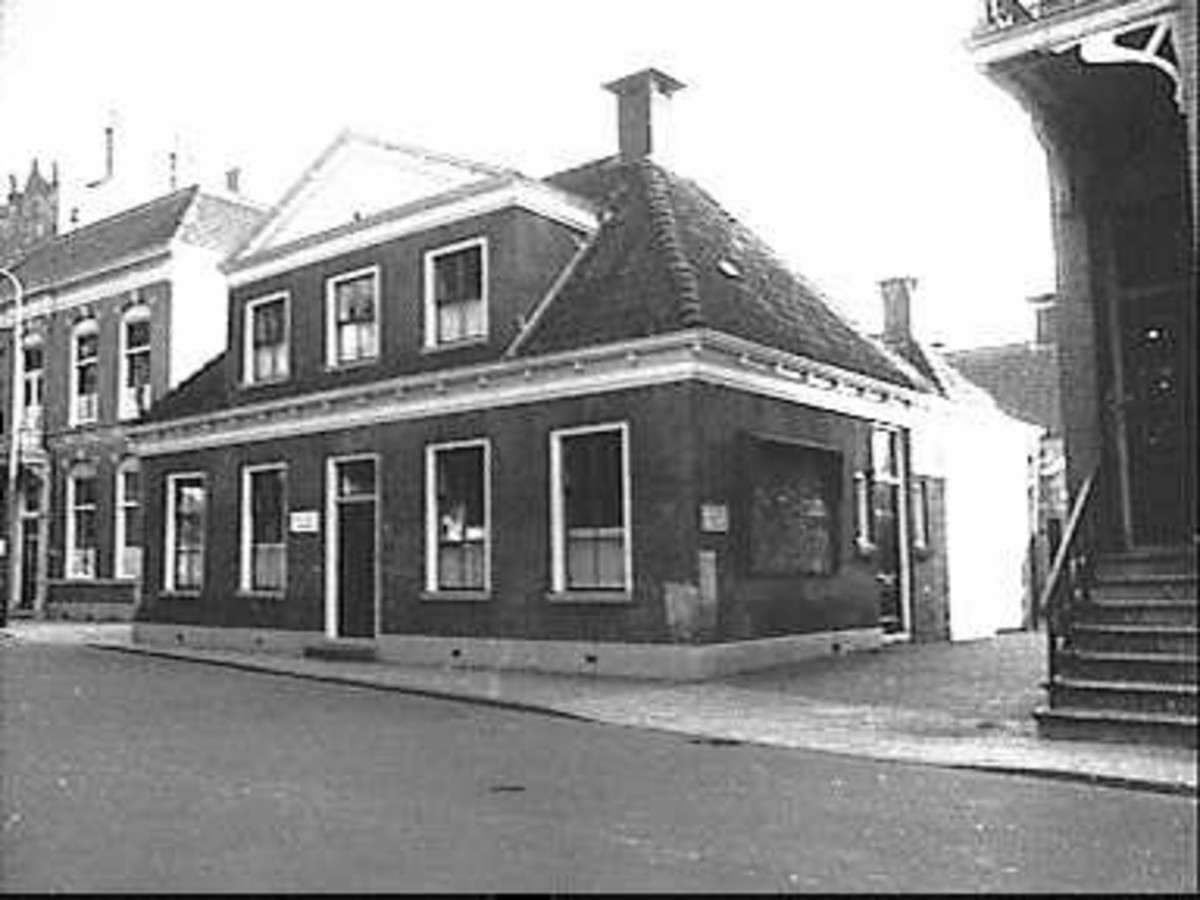
- House in Anreep

- Location in province of Drenthe in the Netherlands Anreep (Netherlands)
- Coordinates: 52°58′35″N 6°35′9″E
- Country: Netherlands
- Province: Drenthe
- Municipality: Assen

Area
  - Total: 3.03 km^{2} (1.17 sq mi)
- Elevation: 11 m (36 ft)

Population (2021)
  - Total: 60
  - Density: 20/km^{2} (51/sq mi)
- Time zone: UTC+1 (CET)
  - Summer (DST): UTC+2 (CEST)
- Postal code: 9404
- Dialing code: 0592

Anreep is a hamlet in the Netherlands and is part of the Assen municipality in Drenthe.

Anreep is a statistical entity with Schieven, however the postal authority have placed it under Assen. It was first mentioned in 1217 as Anrepe and means "higher piece of land near water". The hamlet is located outside of the build-up area. In 1815, it became part of the municipality of Assen. In 1840, Anreep had 42 inhabitants.
