= Jos Hooiveld =

Dutch footballer (born 1983)

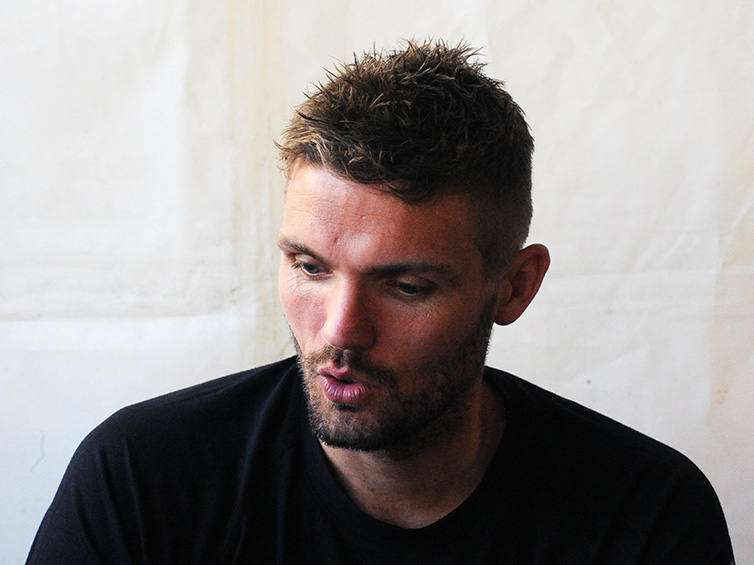
- Hooiveld in 2015

Personal information
- Full name: Jos Hooiveld
- Date of birth: 22 April 1983 (age 43)
- Place of birth: Zeijen, Netherlands
- Height: 1.93 m (6 ft 4 in)
- Position: Centre-back

Youth career
- SVZ
- Achilles 1894
- LTC Assen
- Emmen
- Heerenveen

Senior career*
Years	Team	Apps	(Gls)
2003–2006	Heerenveen	14	(0)
2004–2006	→ Zwolle (loan)	45	(3)
2006–2007	Kapfenberger SV	14	(0)
2007–2009	Inter Turku	52	(5)
2009–2010	AIK	28	(0)
2010–2011	Celtic	7	(0)
2011	→ Copenhagen (loan)	11	(0)
2011	→ Southampton (loan)	14	(2)
2011–2015	Southampton	53	(5)
2014–2015	→ Norwich City (loan)	6	(0)
2015	→ Millwall (loan)	15	(1)
2015–2017	AIK	22	(1)
2017–2018	FC Twente	21	(0)
2017–2018	Jong FC Twente	2	(0)
2018	Orange County SC	14	(1)

International career
2001–2002	Netherlands U19	4	(0)
- * Club domestic league appearances and goals as of 6 October 2018

Jos Hooiveld (Dutch pronunciation: [ˈjɔs ˈɦoːifɛlt]; born 22 April 1983) is a Dutch retired footballer. Hooiveld is known for his strong physical performances.

Born in Zeijen, Drenthe, he started his career with Eredivisie club Heerenveen in 2003, before moving to Eerste Divisie side Zwolle, on loan, between 2004 and 2006. In 2006, he moved to Austrian Erste Liga side Kapfenberger SV and one year later moved to Finnish side Inter Turku. During his time there he won both the 2008 Veikkausliiga and 2008 League Cup as well as being named the defender of the year twice.

In 2009 Swedish side AIK signed him and he won the 2009 Allsvenskan and the 2009 Svenska Cupen. He moved to Scottish Premier League side Celtic in January 2010 but after one year was loaned out to Danish Superliga club Copenhagen. He then moved on loan to Championship club Southampton shortly after the start of the 2011–12 season before joining them permanently in December 2011. He was a regular throughout the season helping them win promotion to the Premier League. He spent the final year of his Southampton contract on loan to Norwich City and Millwall. In the summer of 2015 he once again signed for Swedish side AIK.

== Club career ==
=== Heerenveen ===
Hooiveld started his professional career for Heerenveen in 2003, when he came on as a substitute for Petter Hansson. In the next season he made twelve appearances in the League mostly as a left back, starting in five of those matches which included wins over Ajax and PSV. He could not force his way to the first team the following season and was loaned to Zwolle in January 2005 for 18 months. During the 2004−05 season, Hooiveld had an unsuccessful trial with Scottish side Livingston, later claiming that a noisy hotel staff party left him sleep deprived and damaged his chances of winning a contract. He left the club in the summer of 2006 joining Austrian club Kapfenberg.

=== Zwolle ===
Hooiveld made his debut for Zwolle in February 2005 in a 0–0 draw, playing as a left back. He played most of his matches for the club at left back, with brief moves to midfield and central defence. In total he made 44 league appearances during his loan spell scoring three goals.

=== Kapfenberger SV ===
Hooiveld's football career almost ended due to problems with the club and management. In April 2007, after just eight months at the club and having made just fourteen appearances, Hooiveld signed a two-year contract with Inter Turku.

=== Inter Turku ===
In his first season with Inter Turku, Hooiveld was voted as the Most Valuable Player in the Finnish League Cup and after the season he was chosen as the best player of the season by a Finnish magazine Iltalehti and was also named Veikkausliiga defender of the season. In the beginning of the 2008 season he won the League Cup, when FC Inter beat their local rival Turun Palloseura in the final. He went on to help the club to its first ever league title. He was again named Veikkausliiga defender of the season for the second time in only two years in Finland – impressively FC Inter kept 16 clean sheets in the League in 26 matches in which Hooiveld played. After making 52 league appearances and scoring four goals in two successful years in Finland, he signed for AIK in January 2009.

=== AIK ===
Hooiveld made his debut for AIK on 5 April 2009 in a 1–0 win over Halmstad in Allsvenskan. He won the Allsvenskan in 2009 with AIK, the first time the club had won it in eleven years. The club also won Svenska Cupen in 2009, making it the first time ever AIK had done the Double.

Hooiveld made a total of 31 appearances for the club during his one season. Mikael Stahre wished Hooiveld well on his move commenting "Jos has, during this year, helped and contributed to the winning mentality that characterizes AIK. Idols come and go, AIK remains. We wish him well in his future career."

=== Celtic ===
On 11 January 2010, Celtic announced that Hooiveld had signed a three-and-a-half-year deal with the club, moving for a fee of around £2,000,000. Hooiveld was given the number 16 shirt, vacated by Willo Flood after his transfer to Middlesbrough. He made his debut for Celtic against Hamilton Academical on 30 January 2010. In his following game, against Kilmarnock, Hooiveld went off with a thigh injury, and did not make another appearance for Celtic that season.

The following season, Hooiveld was given the number 6 shirt after Landry N'Guemo returned to AS Nancy. He made his European debut for the Glasgow side in a 3–0 Champions League defeat to Portuguese side Braga on 28 July 2010. He lost his place in the team after giving away a penalty in a 4–0 Europa League defeat to FC Utrecht a month later, before returning as a substitute in the 9–0 win over Aberdeen in November 2010.

=== Copenhagen ===
On 19 January 2011, Hooiveld joined Copenhagen on loan until the end of the season. Hooiveld made 11 appearances for Copenhagen (four as a substitute) but on 28 May 2011 the club announced that they would not be taking up the option to make the move permanent.

=== Southampton ===
On 31 August 2011, the final day of the summer transfer window, Hooiveld joined Southampton on a loan deal until January 2012. On 21 September 2011, he scored his first goal in a 2–1 victory over Preston North End in the League Cup. On 18 October, he scored his first league goal in a 1–0 victory over West Ham United, a win which put the Saints five points clear at the top of the table.

After impressing during his loan spell, the transfer was made permanent on 1 December 2011, the fee undisclosed. Southampton were able to sign him outside of the transfer window because he was already registered as their player. He scored for the second time against West Ham United in a 1–1 draw. He then made it two goals in as many games just days later in a 4–0 victory over Derby County. He scored on the final day of the season to help send the club back to the Premier League in a 4–0 victory over Coventry. This was his eighth goal of the campaign, seven of which had been in the league.

On 26 January 2015, Hooiveld joined Millwall on loan for the remainder of the season, having previously been on loan at Norwich City. At Millwall he scored once in a 2–1 win over Charlton Athletic.

=== AIK ===
On 10 July 2015 it was announced that Hooiveld signed a 2.5 year deal with AIK.

He scored his first goal with the club in a match against GIF Sundsvall

=== Twente ===
On 25 January 2017, Hooiveld joined Twente on a contract until the summer of 2018.

=== Orange County ===
On 5 June 2018, Hooiveld signed for California-based Orange County of the United Soccer League. On 30 December, Hooiveld announced that he was retiring from football on Instagram.

== International career ==
Hooiveld played 4 games for the Netherlands national under-19 football team.

== Post-playing career ==
After retiring as a player, Hooiveld became teammanager at FC Groningen and later coach of the defensive players of the senior and youth teams.

== Honours ==
Inter Turku

- Veikkausliiga: 2008
- Finnish League Cup: 2008

AIK

- Allsvenskan: 2009
- Svenska Cupen: 2009

Copenhagen

- Danish Superliga: 2010–11

Southampton

- Football League Championship runners-up: 2011–12

Individual

- Veikkausliiga Defender of the Year: 2007, 2008
- Allsvenskan Player of the Year: 2009
