= Juul Kraijer =

Dutch visual artist (born 1970)

Juul Kraijer (born 31 October 1970) is a Dutch visual artist. Her work has been exhibited internationally, and is included in major museum collections such as the Museum of Modern Art, New York City, the Rijksmuseum in Amsterdam, the Kunstmuseum in The Hague, the Museum of Old and New Art, Tasmania and the Kupferstichkabinett Berlin.

== Life and work ==
Kraijer was born in Assen. She studied at the Academy of Fine Arts in Rotterdam, graduating in 1994 with a series of large format charcoal drawings. Her principal mediums are drawing, photography and collage. She occasionally makes sculptures and video-works.

In the drawings Kraijer's subject is always female, naked and depersonalized, an archetype or personage rather than a particular individual. The model is sometimes multiplied: facing herself, head to head, or appearing as Siamese twins or triplets. In most works the human body is combined with other creatures or natural phenomena: surrounded by schools of little fish or swarms of moths, fused with branches or parts of animals or displaying mountainscapes on the skin.

Kraijer favors charcoal, and only rarely works in colour. The size of her drawings is determined by the image, which is always depicted more or less life-size.

Since 2012 photography has been an important medium in Kraijers practice. Her photographs are also mostly black and white and thematically closely related to her drawings. She often works with the same model, who poses with objects or animals, most notably snakes.

Kraijer's works share an emblemata-like concision, showing no more than what is strictly necessary. In each image, the figure looms out of an undefined background. Definition of time is absent as well. No hairstyles or dress belonging to any specific period are shown, no hint of a narrative is present. The postures and facial expressions are deliberately restrained and intensely concentrated. They seem to have been adopted for eternity. Faces and bodies are a vehicle for meaning rather than portrayals of individuals. The impassive visage, in a state of half-sleep, seems to exist at an interface between self-awareness and self-extinction. The images elude traditional iconography. Kraijer creates naturalistic images that are memorably strange.

Her work has been awarded four Dutch art prizes and has been included in major international exhibitions such as ARS 06 at the Museum of Modern Art KIASMA in Helsinki (2006), the Third Moscow Biennale of Contemporary Art (2009), the Kochi-Muziris Biennale, India (2018) and Metamorphoses, Rijksmuseum, Amsterdam (2026)

== Solo exhibitions ==
- Stedelijk Museum Schiedam, The Netherlands (1998)
- Stedelijk Museum Het Domein, Sittard, The Netherlands (1998)
- Stedelijk Museum Amsterdam, the Netherlands (2001)
- Gemeentemuseum Den Haag, The Hague, The Netherlands (2006)
- Galleria Monica De Cardenas, Milan, Italy | Zuoz, Switzerland (2007, 2014, 2023)
- The Wapping Project/Bankside, London (2014)
- Kunsthalle Giessen, Gießen, Germany (2014)
- Drents Museum and CBK Drenthe, Assen, The Netherlands (2015)
- Chimaera, Huis Marseille, Museum for Photography, Amsterdam, the Netherlands (2017)
- Galerie Les Filles du Calvaire, Paris, Frankrijk (2019)
- Zweiheit, Museum Sinclair-Haus, Bad Homburg vor der Höhe, Germany (2020)
- S , De Ketelfactory, Schiedam, The Netherlands (2021)
- Vadehra Art Gallery, New Delhi, India (2010, 2016, 2023)
- Recontemporary, Turin, Italy. EPHEMERA. (2024)
- FotoForum, Innsbruck, Austria. In Wirklichkeit. (2025)

== Awards ==
- Charlotte Köhler Prijs (1998)
- Pendrecht Cultuurprijs (2000)
- Philip Morris Kunstprijs (2004)
- Thérèse van Duyl-Schwartze Portretprijs (2009)
- nominated for Prix Guerlain du Dessin Contemporain (2018)
- Lensculture Portrait Awards - Single Image 3rd Place (2018)
- Lensculture Black & White Photography Awards - Series 3rd Place (2018)
- Lensculture Critics’ Choice Award (2023)
- Lensculture Black & White Photography Awards - Jurors’ Pick (2025)

== Works in public collections ==
- Museum of Modern Art, New York City: 1 monumental drawing (as of 3 November 2021)
- Museum of Old and New Art, Tasmania
- Museo Helga de Alvear, Cácares, Spain
- Museum of Contemporary Art Kiasma, Helsinki
- Museum Kunstpalast, Düsseldorf
- Kupferstichkabinett Berlin
- Museum Moderner Kunst Vienna
- Fondation Louis Vuitton, Paris
- Museum Boijmans Van Beuningen, Rotterdam
- Gemeentemuseum Den Haag, The Hague
- Drents Museum, Assen
- Huis Marseille Museum voor Fotografie, Amsterdam
- Stedelijk Museum Schiedam
- Stedelijk Museum Het Domein, Sittard
- Teylers Museum, Haarlem
- Fries Museum, Leeuwarden
- Dordrechts Museum, Dordrecht
- Museum Krona, Uden
- Centraal Museum, Utrecht
- Rijksmuseum, Amsterdam
