= Achterveld =

- Village
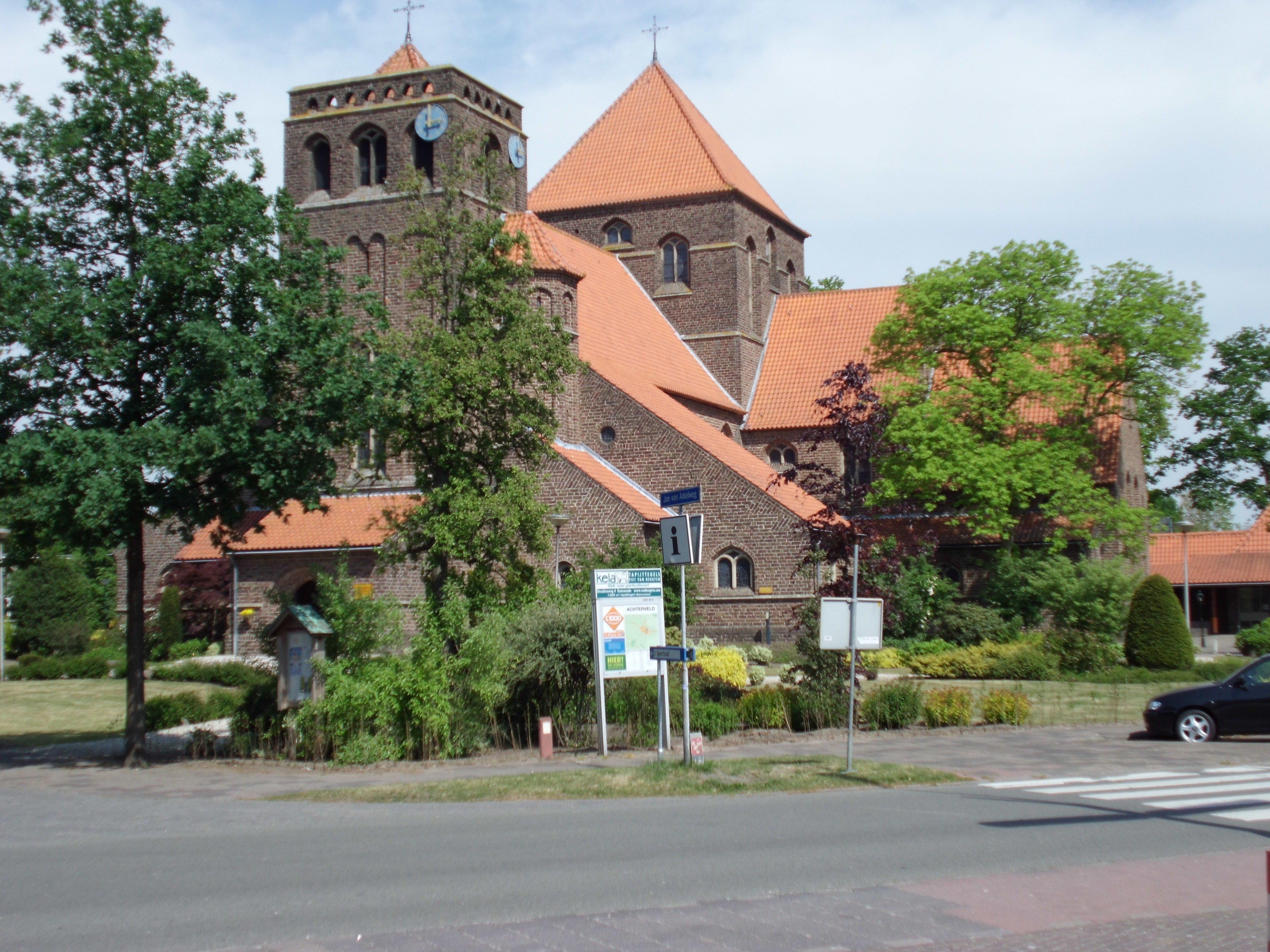
- Church Jozefkerk

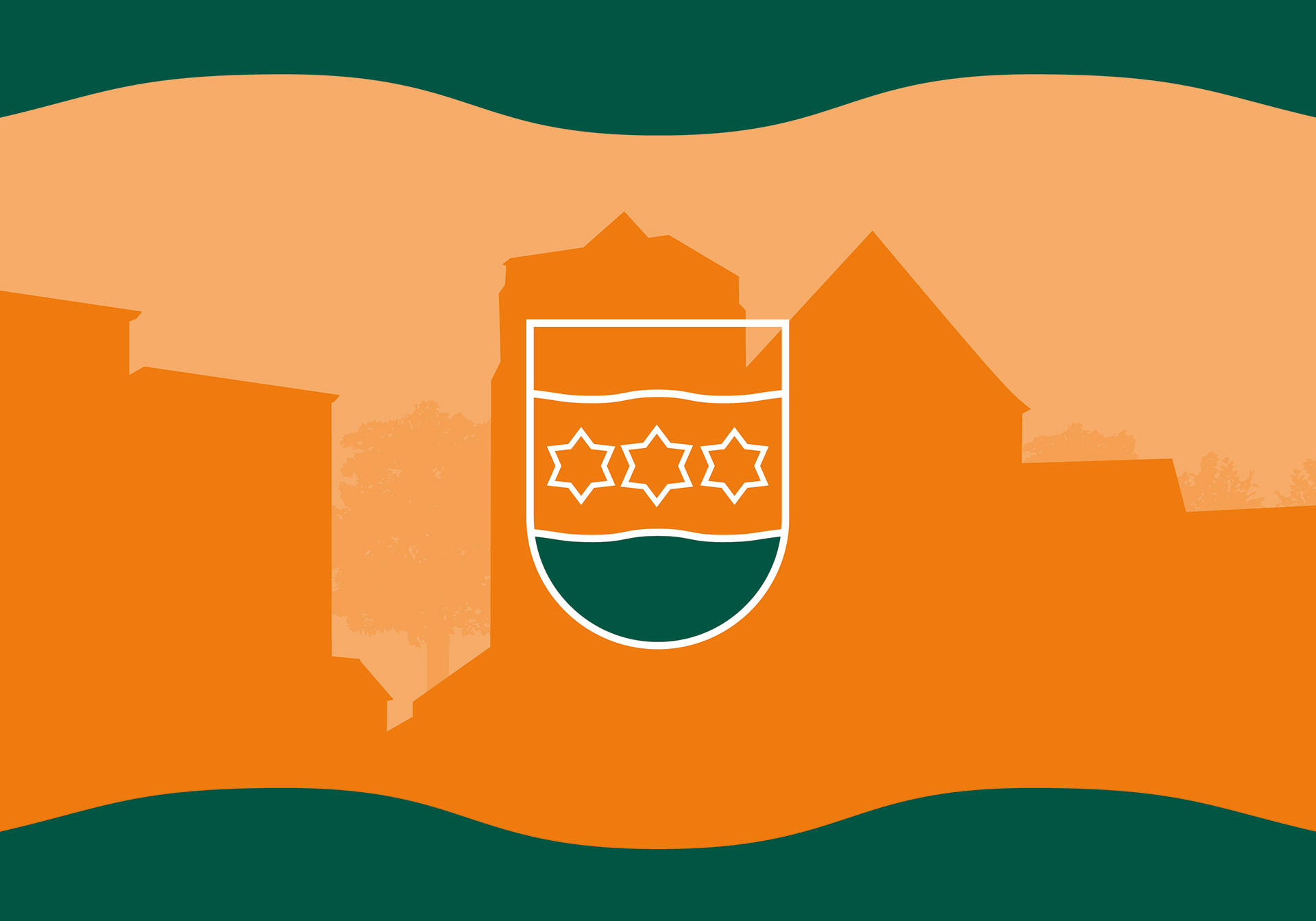
- Flag

- Location in the Netherlands Achterveld (Netherlands)
- Coordinates: 52°8′10″N 5°29′49″E
- Country: Netherlands
- Province: Utrecht
- Municipality: Leusden; Barneveld

Area
  - Total: 10.17 km^{2} (3.93 sq mi)
- Elevation: 6 m (20 ft)

Population (2021)
  - Total: 2,625
  - Density: 258.1/km^{2} (668.5/sq mi)
- Time zone: UTC+1 (CET)
  - Summer (DST): UTC+2 (CEST)
- Postal code: 3791
- Dialing code: 0342
- Website: www.achterveld.net

Achterveld is a village in the central Netherlands. It is a part of the municipality of Leusden, Utrecht and is located about 8 km east of Amersfoort. A small part of the village is located in Barneveld.

The village is a Catholic enclave in a Protestant region. It has a neo-romanesque church.

In 2001, the village of Achterveld had 1616 inhabitants. The built-up area of the village was 0.50 km^{2}, and contained 651 residences. The statistical area "Achterveld", which also can include the peripheral parts of the village, as well as the surrounding countryside, has a population of around 2570.

On 28 to 30 April 1945, Achterveld was the scene of high-ranking talks now known as 'The Achterveld Conference' between the Allied command (among others, General Foulkes of Canada, and General Bedell Smith of the United States), Sir Francis de Guingand of the United Kingdom, Prince Bernhard of the Netherlands, Ivan Susloparov of the Soviet Union and the occupying German government of the Netherlands, headed by 'Reichskomissar' Arthur Seyss-Inquart, and his aides. They discussed urgent food-help for the starving cities in the west of Holland, which Seyss-Inquart allowed, and which started the day after, 29 April, by plane from England, code-named Operation Manna.

The Allies tried to start negotiations about an unconditional German surrender. Seyss-Inquart did not want to comply there and then, although a general cease-fire was convened. The Germans ceased their resistance only on 5 May following, in Wageningen.

In June 2017 was Achterveld in international News, then 14 year-old girl Romy Nieuwburg (born 11 April 2003 in Hoevelaken) from Hoevelaken was found dead in an ditch in Achterveld, she was raped and killed. The perpetrator was then 14 year-old boy Brian Nijhof (born 19 December 2002 in Arnhem) from Lunteren.

== Gallery ==
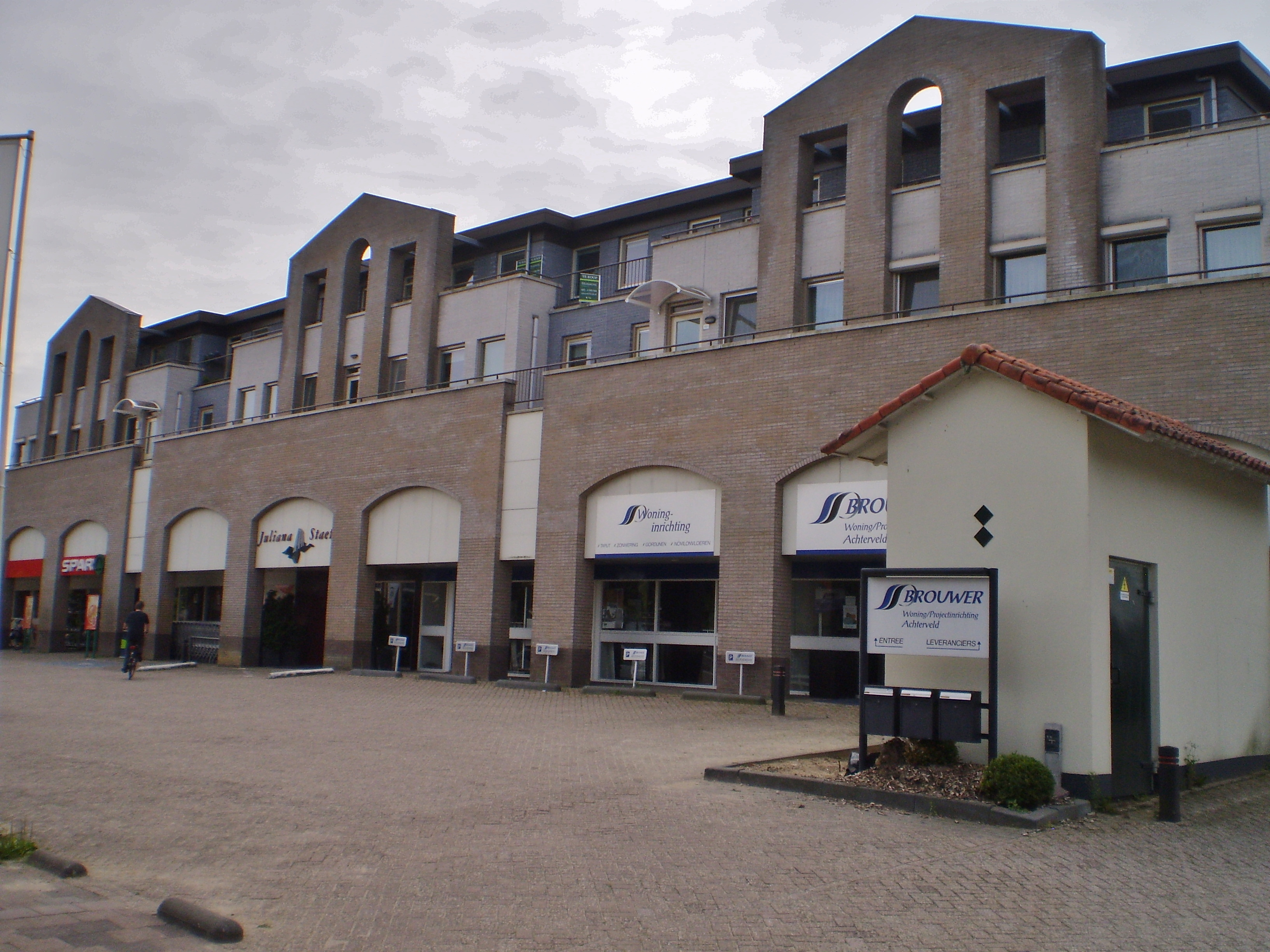
Apartment buildings with shops

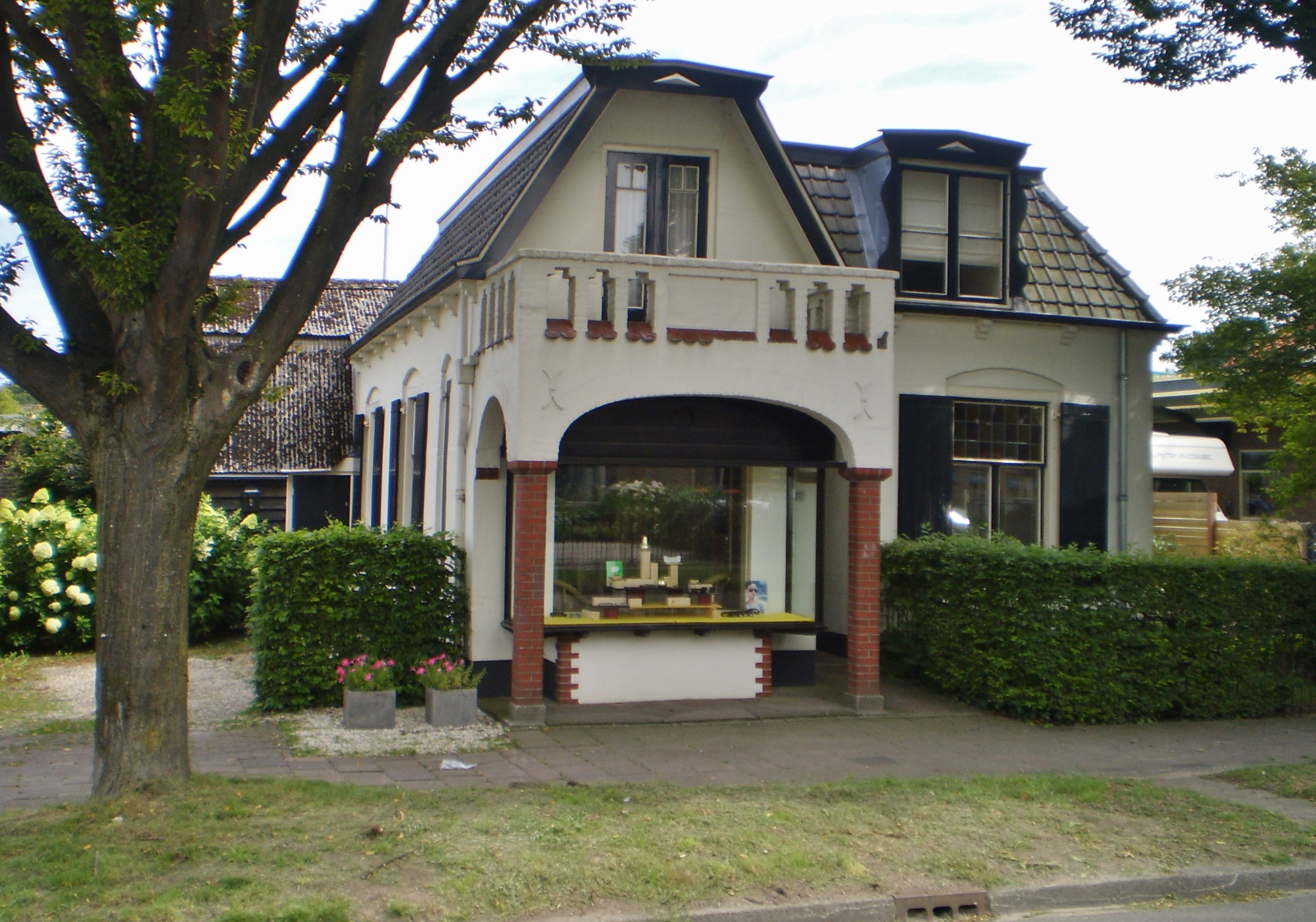
House in Achterveld

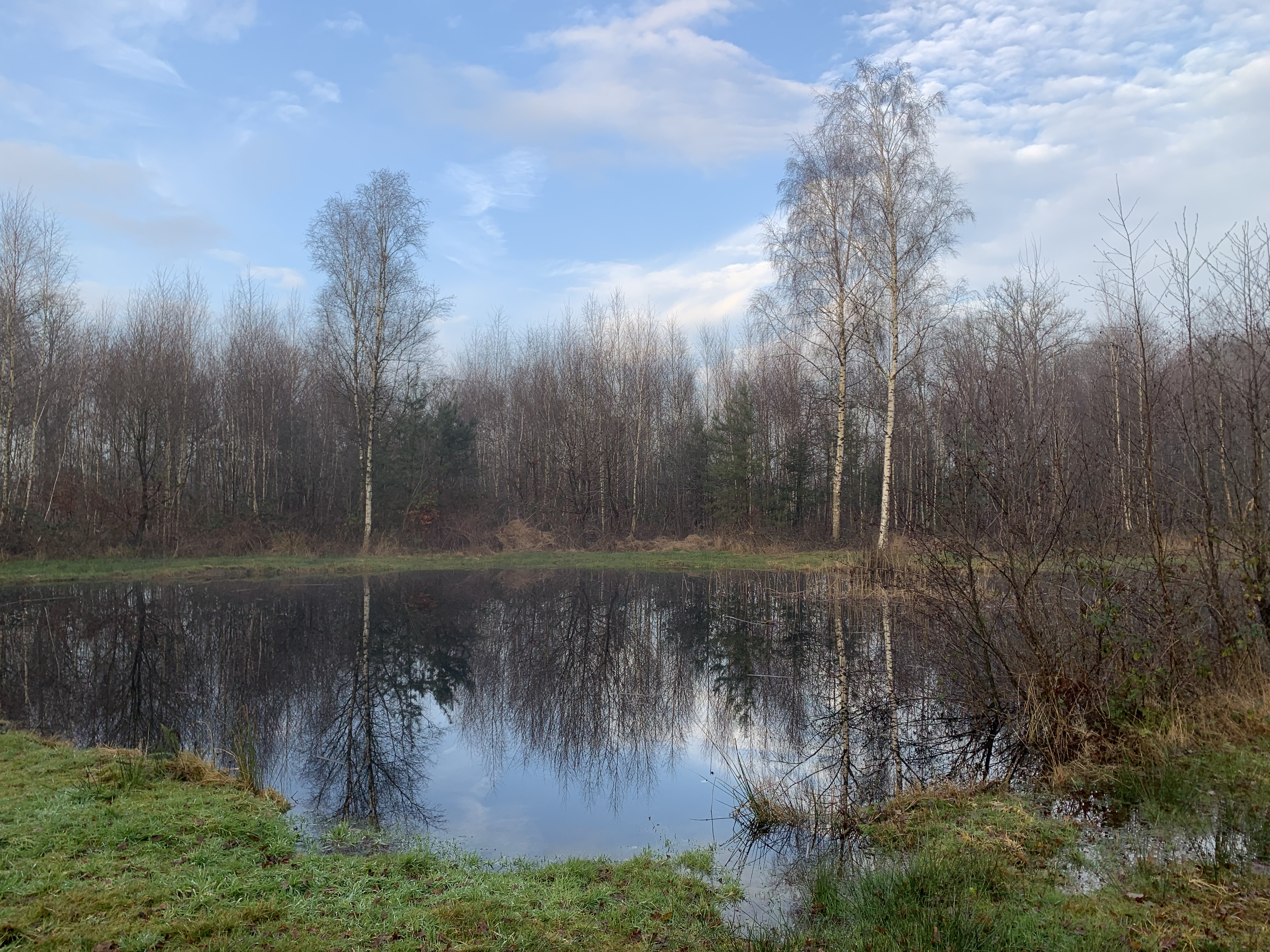
Duck pond

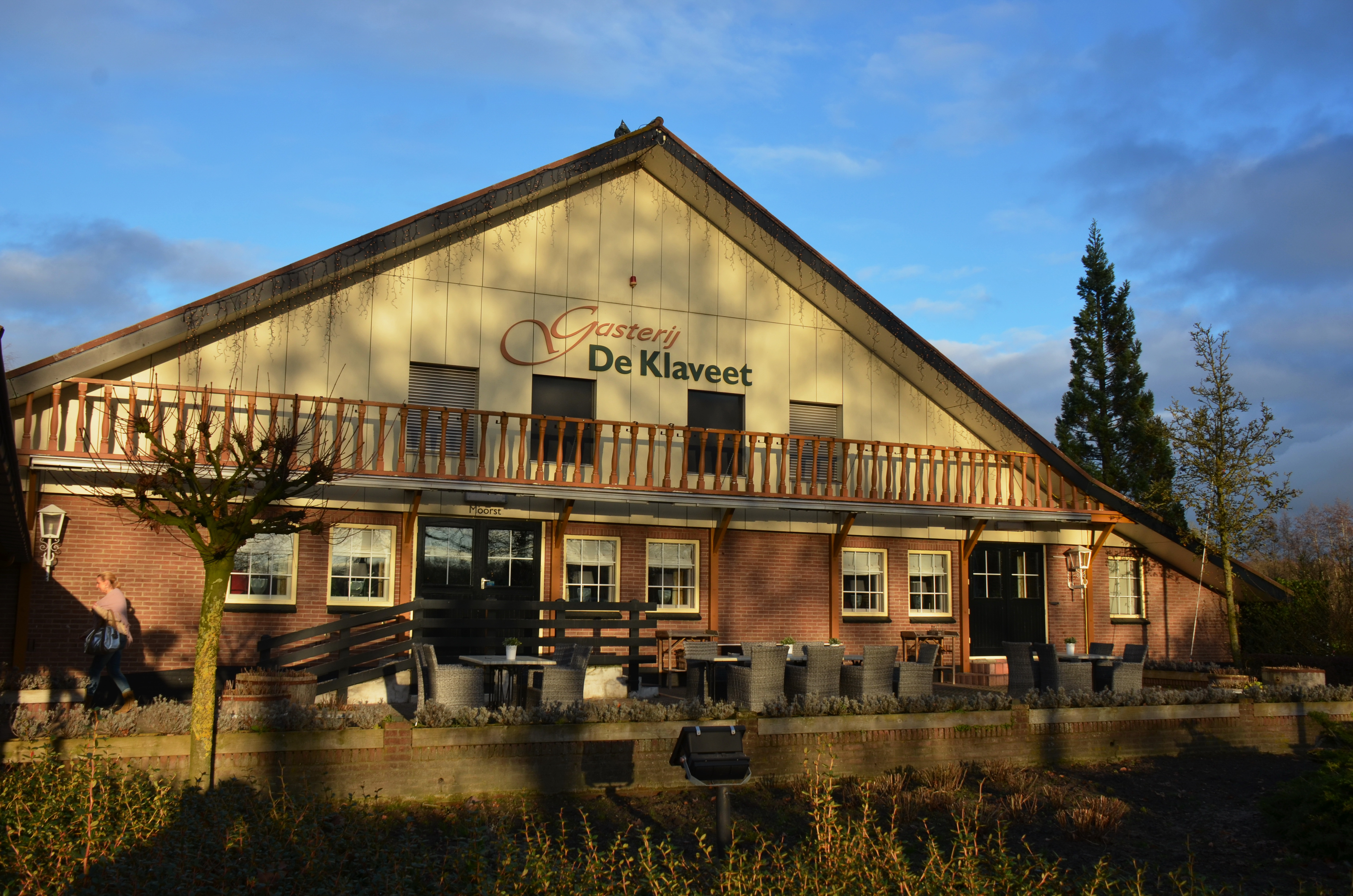
Party centre De Klaveet

== Notable people ==
- Laura van den Hengel (born 1991), racing driver

== Sport ==
- Tour de junior, annual bicycle race
