= Ter Aard =

- Hamlet
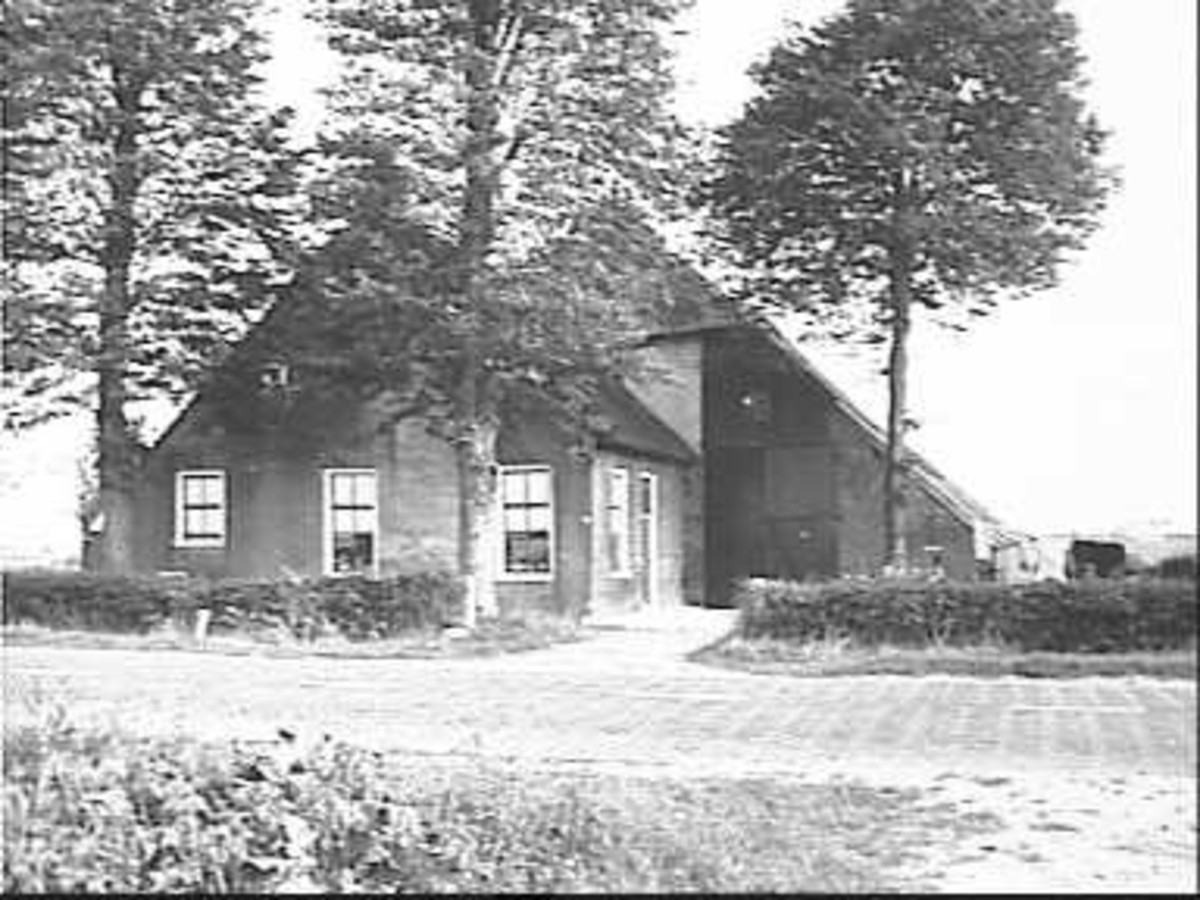
- Farm in Ter Aard

- Location in province of Drenthe in the Netherlands Ter Aard (Netherlands)
- Coordinates: 53.0251°N 6.5446°E
- Country: Netherlands
- Province: Drenthe
- Municipality: Assen

Area
  - Total: 2.67 km^{2} (1.03 sq mi)
- Elevation: 13 m (43 ft)

Population (2021)
  - Total: 100
  - Density: 37/km^{2} (97/sq mi)
- Time zone: UTC+1 (CET)
  - Summer (DST): UTC+2 (CEST)
- Postal code: 9487
- Dialing code: 0592

Ter Aard is a hamlet in the Netherlands and is part of the Assen municipality in Drenthe.

Ter Aard is a statistical entity, and has its own postal code, however it is considered a part of Zeijen. It was first mentioned in 1335 as "in Arth" and means "near the farmland". In 1840, it was home to 25 people.

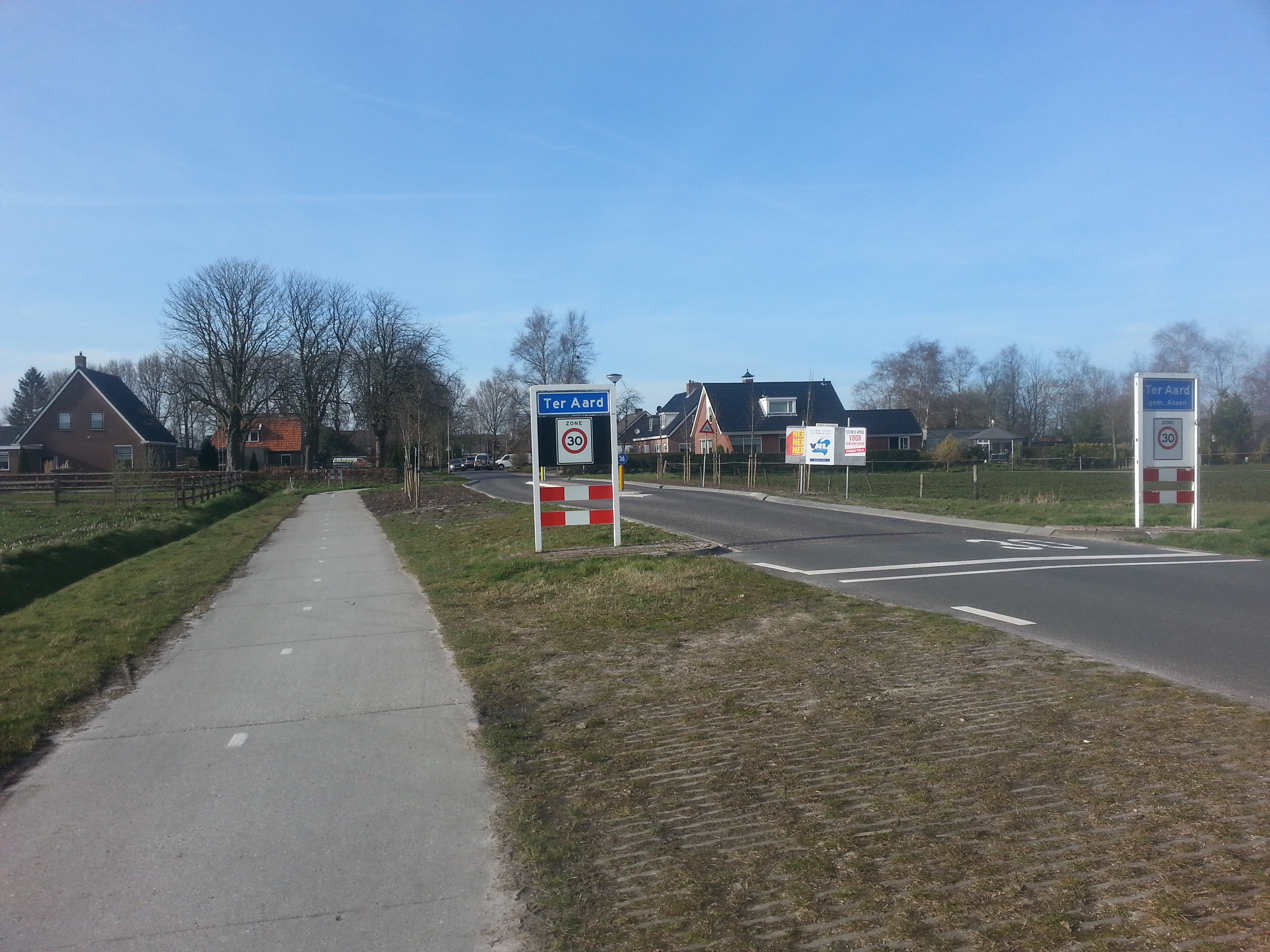
Ter Aard town limits
