= Witten, Netherlands =

Witten
- Hamlet
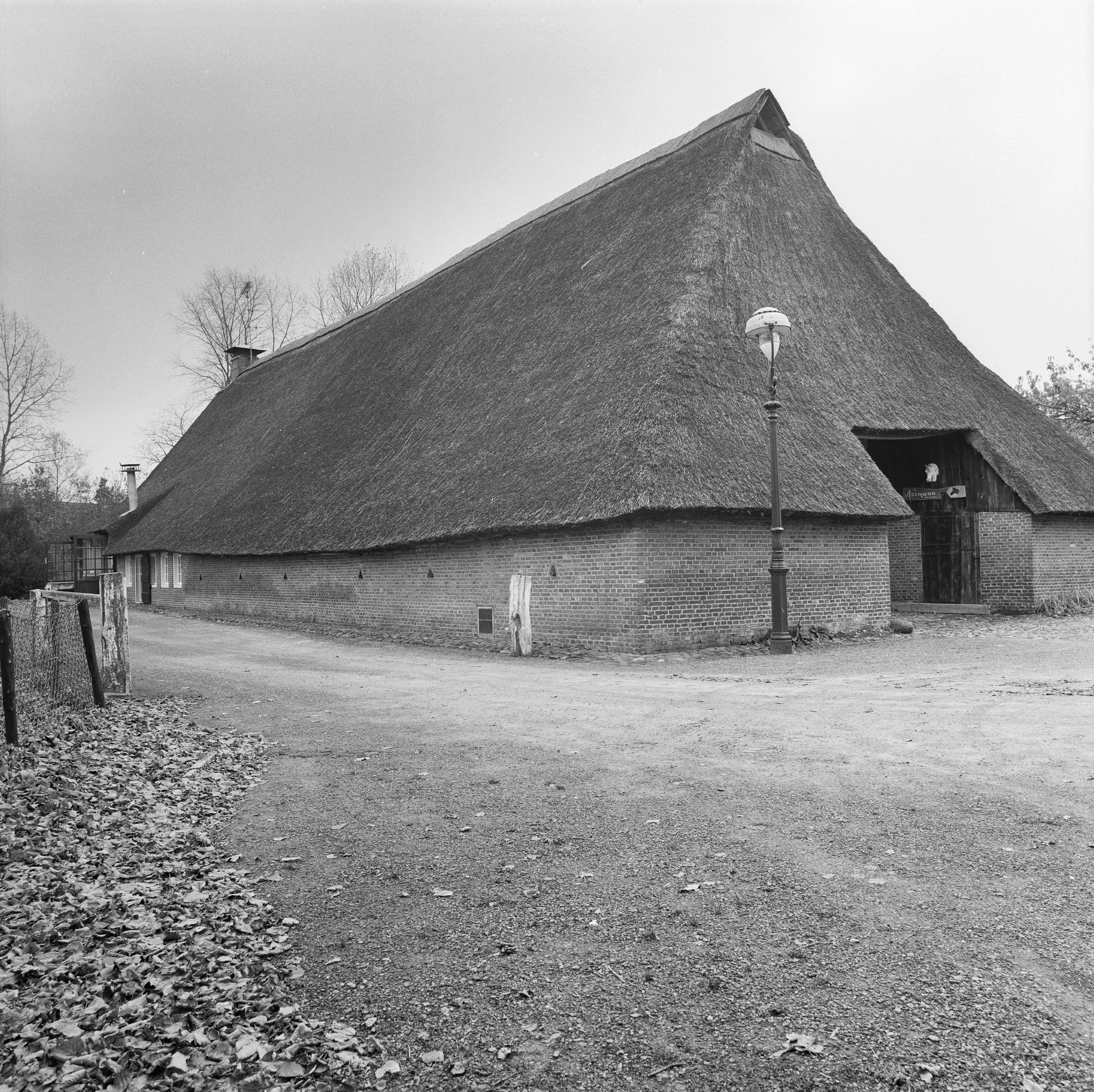
- Farm in Witten

- Location in province of Drenthe in the Netherlands Witten (Netherlands)
- Coordinates: 52.98132°N 6.51604°E
- Country: Netherlands
- Province: Drenthe
- Municipality: Assen

Area
  - Total: 17.01 km^{2} (6.57 sq mi)
- Elevation: 10 m (33 ft)

Population (2021)
  - Total: 190
  - Density: 11/km^{2} (29/sq mi)
- Time zone: UTC+1 (CET)
  - Summer (DST): UTC+2 (CEST)
- Postal code: 9405
- Dialing code: 0592

Witten is a hamlet in the Netherlands and is part of the Assen municipality in Drenthe.

Witten is a statistical entity, however the postal authority have placed it under Assen. It was first mentioned in 1294 as Withen. The etymology is not clear. In 1815, it became part of the municipality of Assen. In 1840, it was home to 86 people.

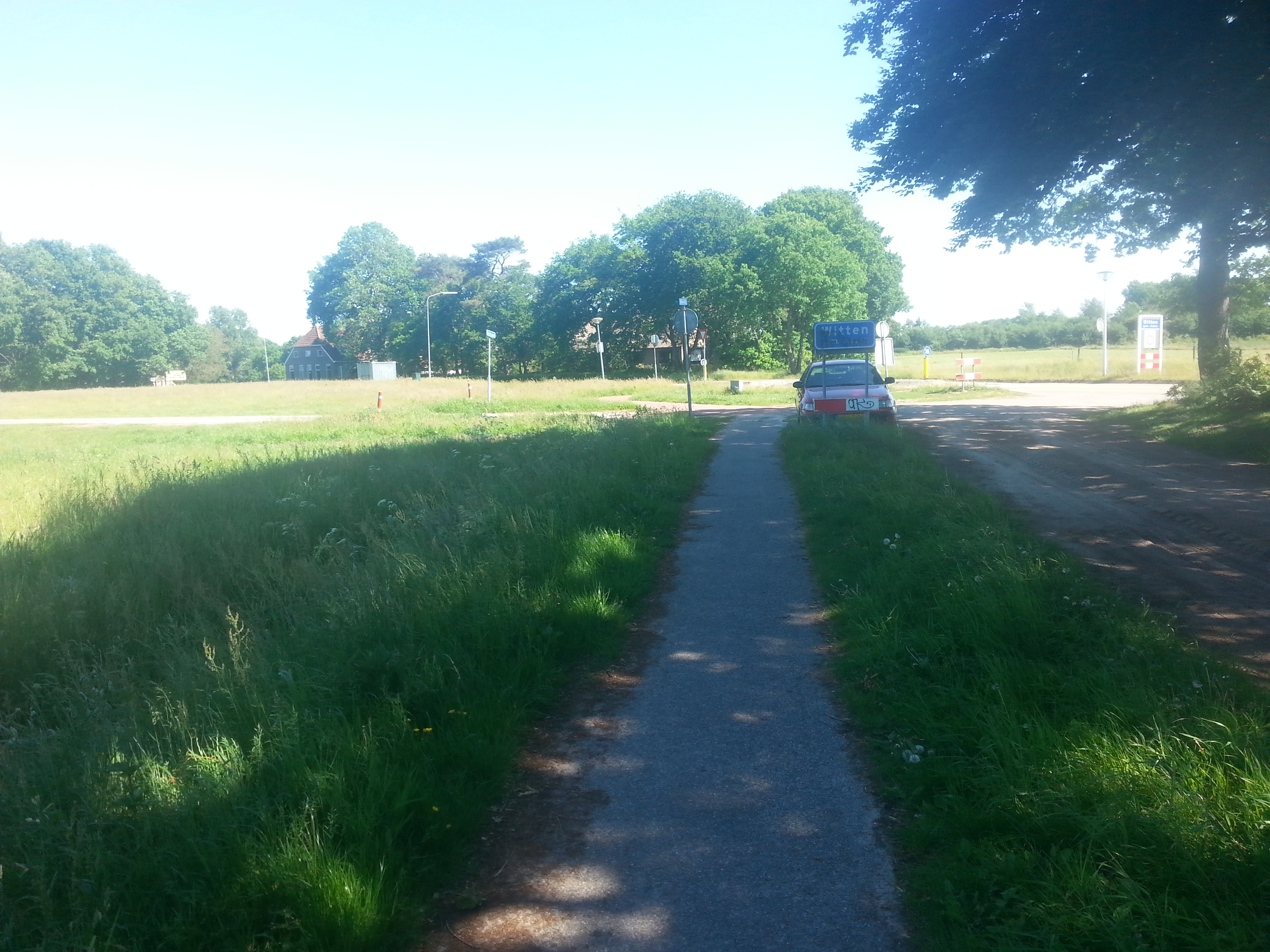
Witten town limit
