= Graswijk =

- Hamlet
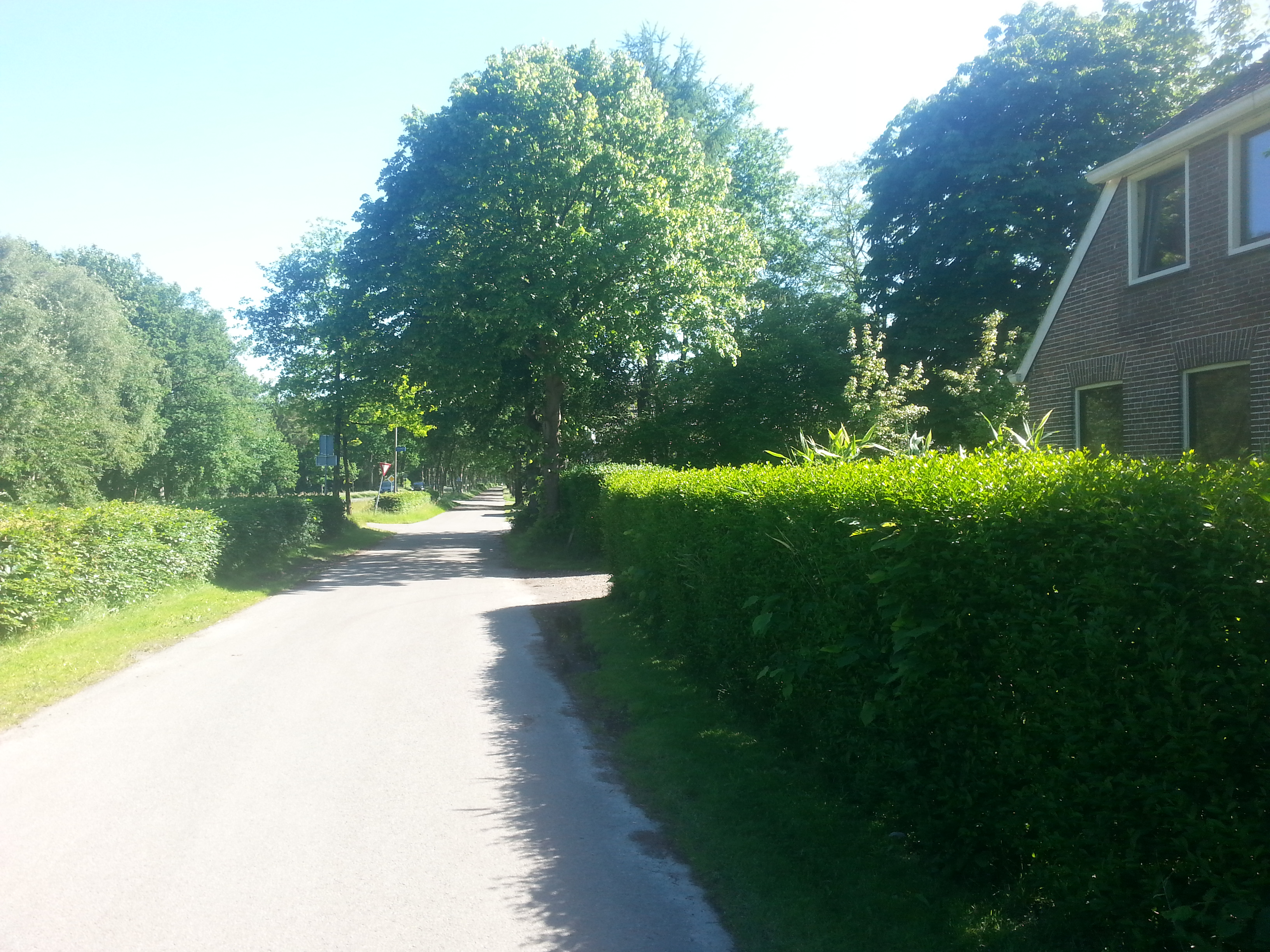
- House in Graswijk

- Location in province of Drenthe in the Netherlands Graswijk (Netherlands)
- Coordinates: 52.9756°N 6.5558°E
- Country: Netherlands
- Province: Drenthe
- Municipality: Assen

Area
  - Total: 2.34 km^{2} (0.90 sq mi)
- Elevation: 13 m (43 ft)

Population (2021)
  - Total: 80
  - Density: 34/km^{2} (89/sq mi)
- Time zone: UTC+1 (CET)
  - Summer (DST): UTC+2 (CEST)
- Postal code: 9405
- Dialing code: 0592

Graswijk is a hamlet in the Netherlands and is part of the Assen municipality in Drenthe.

Graswijk is a statistical entity, but the postal authorities have placed it under Assen. It was first mentioned in the 1850s, and means neighbourhood near grass.
