= Schieven =

- Hamlet
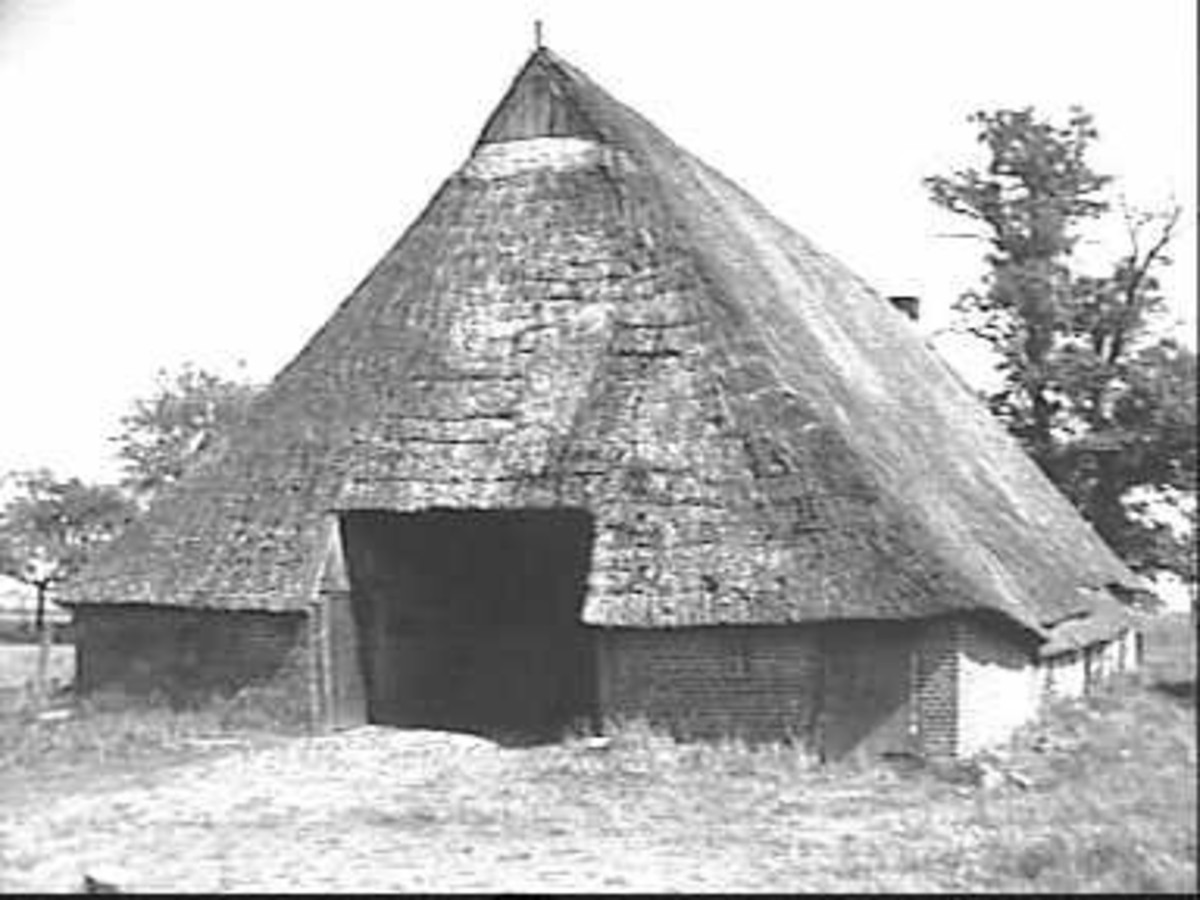
- Farm in Schieven

- Location in province of Drenthe in the Netherlands Schieven (Netherlands)
- Coordinates: 52°58′48″N 6°35′26″E
- Country: Netherlands
- Province: Drenthe
- Municipality: Assen

Area
  - Total: 2.00 km^{2} (0.77 sq mi)
- Elevation: 11 m (36 ft)

Population (2021)
  - Total: 125
  - Density: 62.5/km^{2} (162/sq mi)
- Time zone: UTC+1 (CET)
  - Summer (DST): UTC+2 (CEST)
- Postal code: 9404
- Dialing code: 0592

Schieven is a hamlet in the Netherlands and is part of the Assen municipality in Drenthe.

Schieven is a statistical entity with Anreep, however the postal authority have placed it under Assen. It was first mentioned in 1460 as "Johan Scheuen ... buur to Anrepe". The etymology is unclear. In 1840, it was home to 16 people.
