= Fietsvierdaagse =

Dutch cycling event

The fietsvierdaagse ("cycling four-day") is a Dutch bicycle event. The event consists of four days of recreational cycling. Mainly during spring and summer, several fietsvierdaagsen are organised throughout the Netherlands. The fietsvierdaagsen are annual events and most take place in the countryside of the Netherlands. A fietsvierdaagse tour is always divided in four separate courses; one for each day of the event.

The fietsvierdaagse is a typically Dutch event. The Dutch landscape is rich in bicycle trails (fietspaden), where participants are not bothered by cars and other traffic. As the countryside is rather flat, it makes for easy and relaxed cycling. The fietsvierdaagsen are organised by local foundations, which set a route that the participants are to follow. The fietsvierdaagse is a family event and many people participate in it. However, the events are especially well attended by older adults who have more free time or are retired, and isn't quite as popular among children and young adults. Every year they subscribe to a four-day cycling tour through the local area. The goal is not to set a time, but to enjoy nature and to finish the tour. When the participants have completed the four days and have passed through all checkpoints, they usually get an award, often in the form of a small medal.

The most famous fietsvierdaagse is the Drentse Fiets 4daagse in the province of Drenthe. Other major fietsvierdaagsen are the Internationale Fietsvierdaagse Nijmegen around the city of Nijmegen and Fietsvierdaagse "De Achterhoek" in the region of Achterhoek, but many local communities in the rural areas of the Netherlands have their own fietsvierdaagse.

A specific version of the fietsvierdaagse is the avondfietsvierdaagse ("evening cycling four-day"). That is a four-day cycle tour in the evenings. The Dutch tend to organise all different kinds of four-day events: another example is the wandelvierdaagse ("walking four-day"). It is not exactly clear why these events must be held in four days, but four days fit nicely in a week.

The Drentse Fietsvierdaagse attracts over 30000 participants and is one of over 60 fietsmeerdaagse (i.e. 3 or 4 day cycling events) held around the country each year. A surprisingly large proportion of the total population of the country takes part in these events.
