= Aard el Borj =

Mountain in Lebanon

- Location within Lebanon

Highest point
- Prominence: 671 m (2,201 ft)
- Coordinates: 33°13′17″N 35°24′53″E

Geography
- Location: Lebanon

Aard el Borj is a mountain of southern Lebanon. It has an elevation of 671 metres.
