= Jeugdtour =

Cycling Event

The Internationale Jeugdtour Assen is the largest youth cycle racing event held in Europe. It has been held annually since 1960 in the city of Assen in the Netherlands. Each year it attracts hundreds of racing cyclists, many of whom go on to success in later years.

Erik Dekker is an example of a well known Dutch cycle racer who started in the Jeugdtour.

In 2009 the Jeugdtour will be associated with the Vuelta a España which is also starting in the city of Assen.

== Sources ==
- http://www.jeugdtourassen.nl/
