= Alanine and arginine-rich domain-containing protein =

Protein in homo sapiens

AARD

Identifiers
- Aliases: AARD, C8orf85, alanine and arginine rich domain containing protein
- External IDs: MGI: 2181621; HomoloGene: 17041; GeneCards: AARD; OMA:AARD - orthologs

Gene location (Human)
Chr.	Chromosome 8 (human)
Band	8q24.11	Start	116,938,207 bp
Band	8q24.11	End	116,944,487 bp

Gene location (Mouse)
Chr.	Chromosome 15 (mouse)
Band	15|15 C	Start	51,903,503 bp
Band	15|15 C	End	51,909,118 bp
RNA expression pattern
Bgee	Human / Mouse (ortholog); Top expressed in: left testis; right testis; gastric mucosa; gonad; testicle; urinary bladder; muscle layer of sigmoid colon; fundus; prefrontal cortex; islet of Langerhans / Top expressed in: Gonadal ridge; seminiferous tubule; vestibular membrane of cochlear duct; vestibular sensory epithelium; motor neuron; lumbar subsegment of spinal cord; outer renal medulla; yolk sac; transitional epithelium of ureter; cumulus cell; More reference expression data
BioGPS	n/a
Orthologs
Species	Human	Mouse
Entrez	441376	239435
Ensembl	ENSG00000205002	ENSMUSG00000068522
UniProt	Q4LEZ3	Q811W1
RefSeq (mRNA)	NM_001025357	NM_175503
RefSeq (protein)	NP_001020528	NP_780712
Location (UCSC)	Chr 8: 116.94 – 116.94 Mb	Chr 15: 51.9 – 51.91 Mb
PubMed search
- Wikidata
View/Edit Human	View/Edit Mouse

AARD (Alanine and Arginine rich domain containing protein) is a protein that in humans is encoded by the AARD gene.

== Function ==
AARD has been implicated in spermatogenesis in mice.
