= Deurze =

- Village
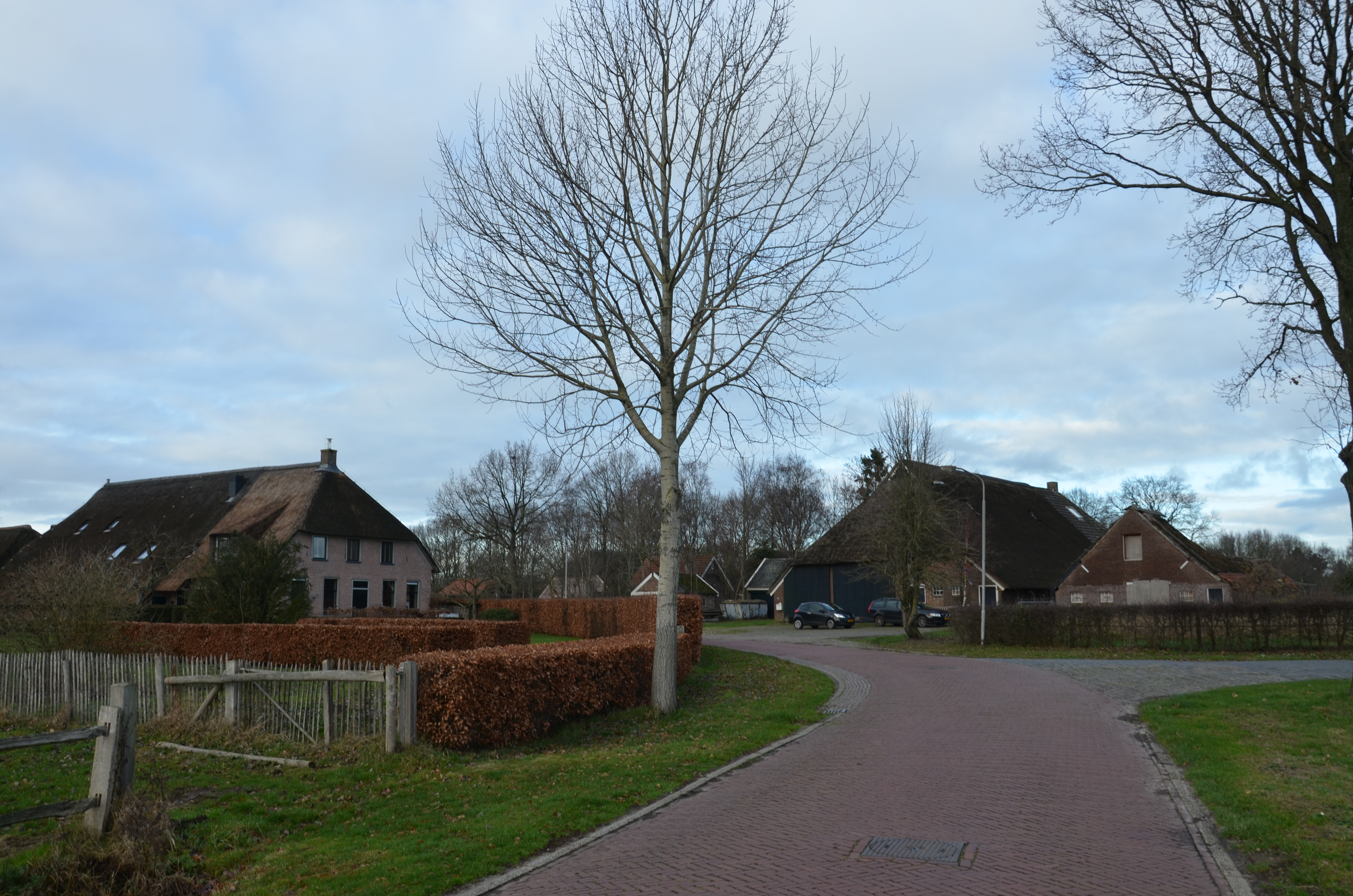
- Deurze (2018)

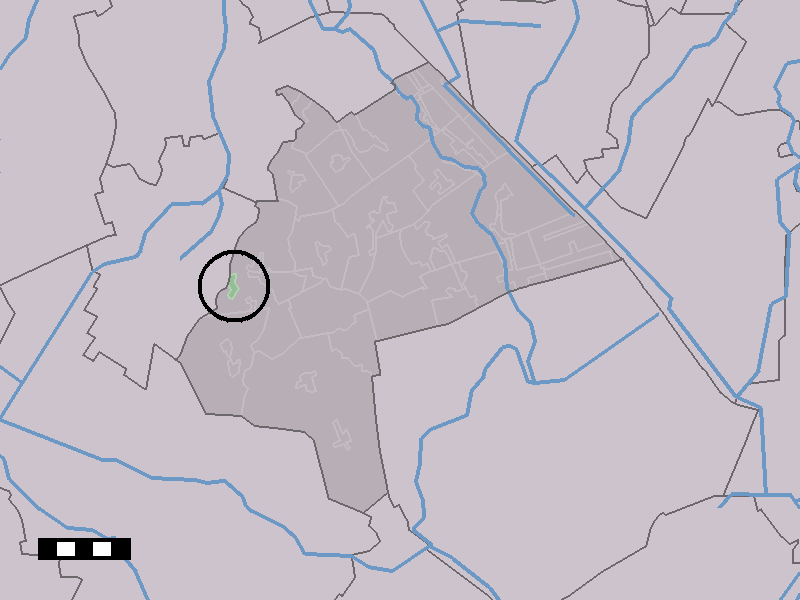
- Deurze in the municipality of Aa en Hunze.

- Location in the Netherlands Deurze (Netherlands)
- Coordinates: 52°59′1″N 6°36′33″E
- Country: Netherlands
- Province: Drenthe
- Municipality: Aa en Hunze

Area
  - Total: 0.50 km^{2} (0.19 sq mi)
- Elevation: 11 m (36 ft)

Population (2021)
  - Total: 85
  - Density: 170/km^{2} (440/sq mi)
- Time zone: UTC+1 (CET)
  - Summer (DST): UTC+2 (CEST)
- Postal code: 9457
- Dialing code: 0592

Deurze is a village in the Dutch province of Drenthe. It is a part of the municipality of Aa en Hunze, and lies about 4 km southeast of Assen.

== History ==
The village was first mentioned in 1259 as "curtem Durse". The etymology is unclear. In 1258, Otto I of Bentheim awarded former possessions of the monastery Maria in Campis, who moved to Assen, to Hako Stevenzoon van Hardenberg. The lands would become known as Deurze. There was a wind mill, however it was destroyed by Christoph Bernhard von Galen, the Prince-Bishop of Münster in 1672 who had built a sconce near the village for his failed invasion of the Netherlands.

Deurze was home to 58 people in 1840.

== Transportation ==
There is no railway station here. The nearest station is Assen station. The nearest bus stop is about 1 km north of the centre at which the services 10, 21, 24 and 28 stop.

For further information see Aa en Hunze#Transportation.
