= Zeijen =

- Village
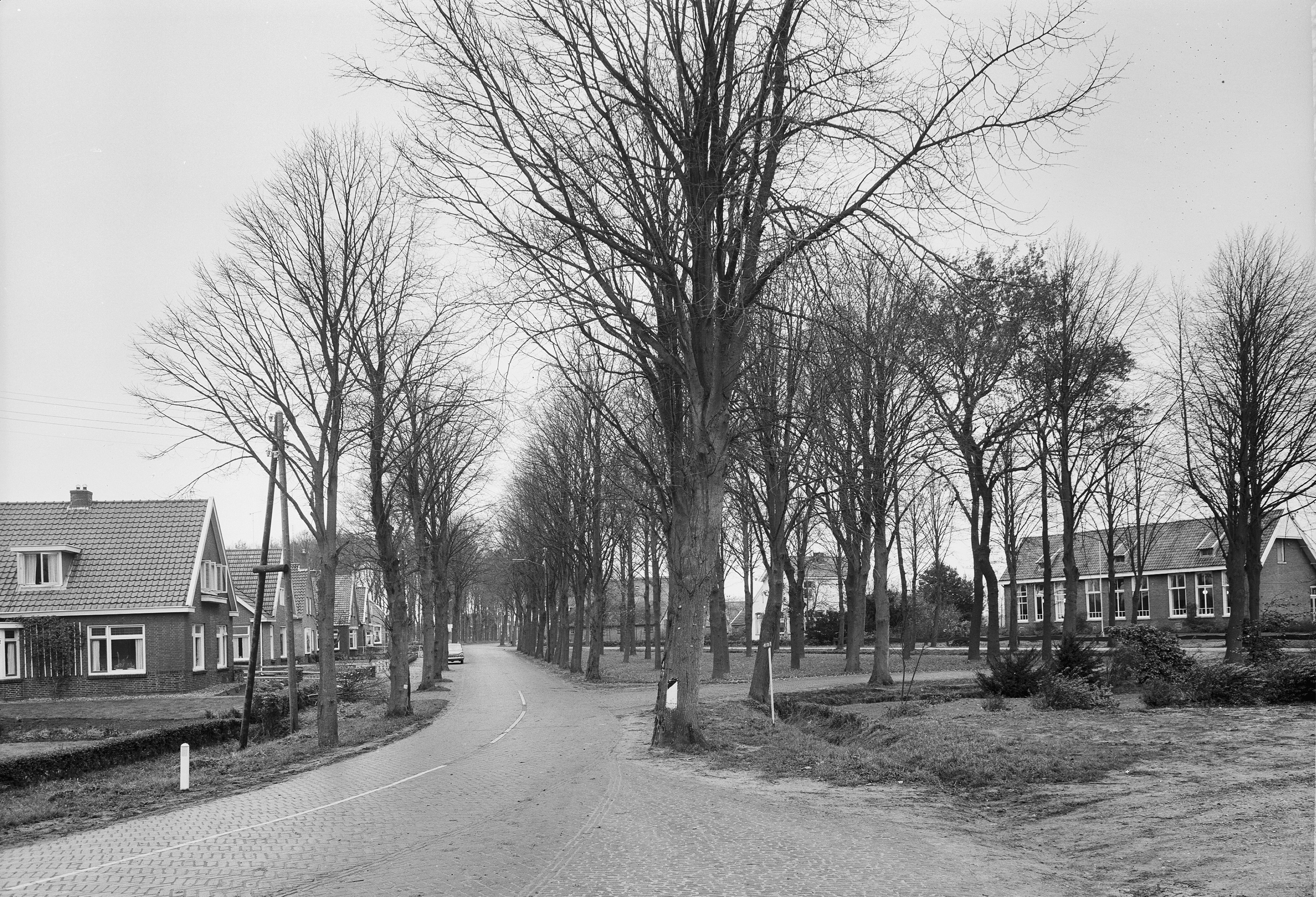
- Village street

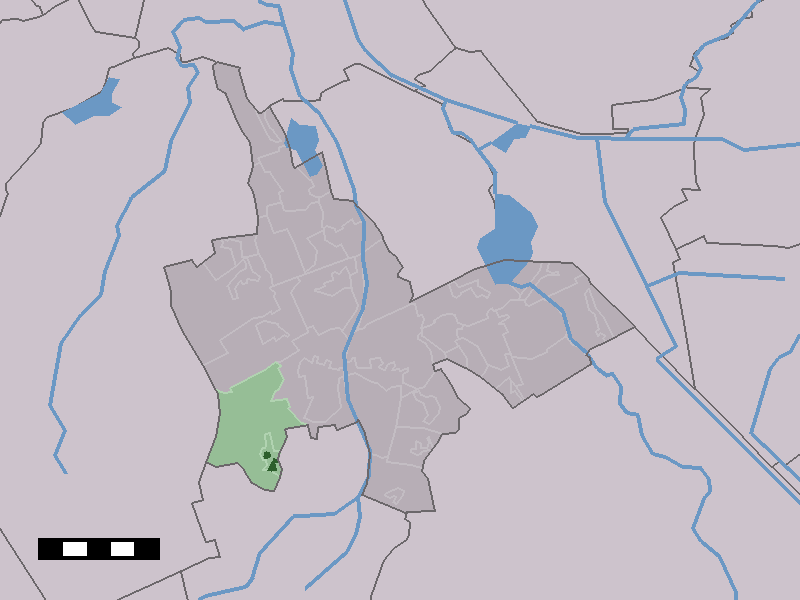
- The village centre (dark green) and the statistical district (light green) of Zeijen in the municipality of Tynaarlo.

- Location in province of Drenthe in the Netherlands Zeijen (Netherlands)
- Coordinates: 53°03′N 6°33′E
- Country: Netherlands
- Province: Drenthe
- Municipality: Tynaarlo

Area
  - Total: 11.91 km^{2} (4.60 sq mi)
- Elevation: 10 m (33 ft)

Population (2021)
  - Total: 735
  - Density: 61.7/km^{2} (160/sq mi)
- Time zone: UTC+1 (CET)
  - Summer (DST): UTC+2 (CEST)
- Postal code: 9491
- Dialing code: 0592

Zeijen (also: Zeyen) is a village in the Dutch province of Drenthe. It is a part of the municipality of Tynaarlo.

The village was first mentioned in 1370 as Lutbert van Zien, and means "slowly flowing" which is probably a reference to the Matsloot stream. Zeijen is an esdorp without a church which developed in the Middle Ages. Zeijen was home to 215 people in 1840.

The hunebed (dolmen) D5 is located near the nature area de Zeijer Strubben. The stones are partially buried. The hunebed has four capstones. In 1857, the stones were put up for sale by the owner of the land. Lucas Oldenhuis Gratama, a local politician, bought site for ƒ40,- and transferred ownership to the province of Drenthe.

== Notable people born in Zeijen ==
- Jos Hooiveld (born 1983), football (soccer) player

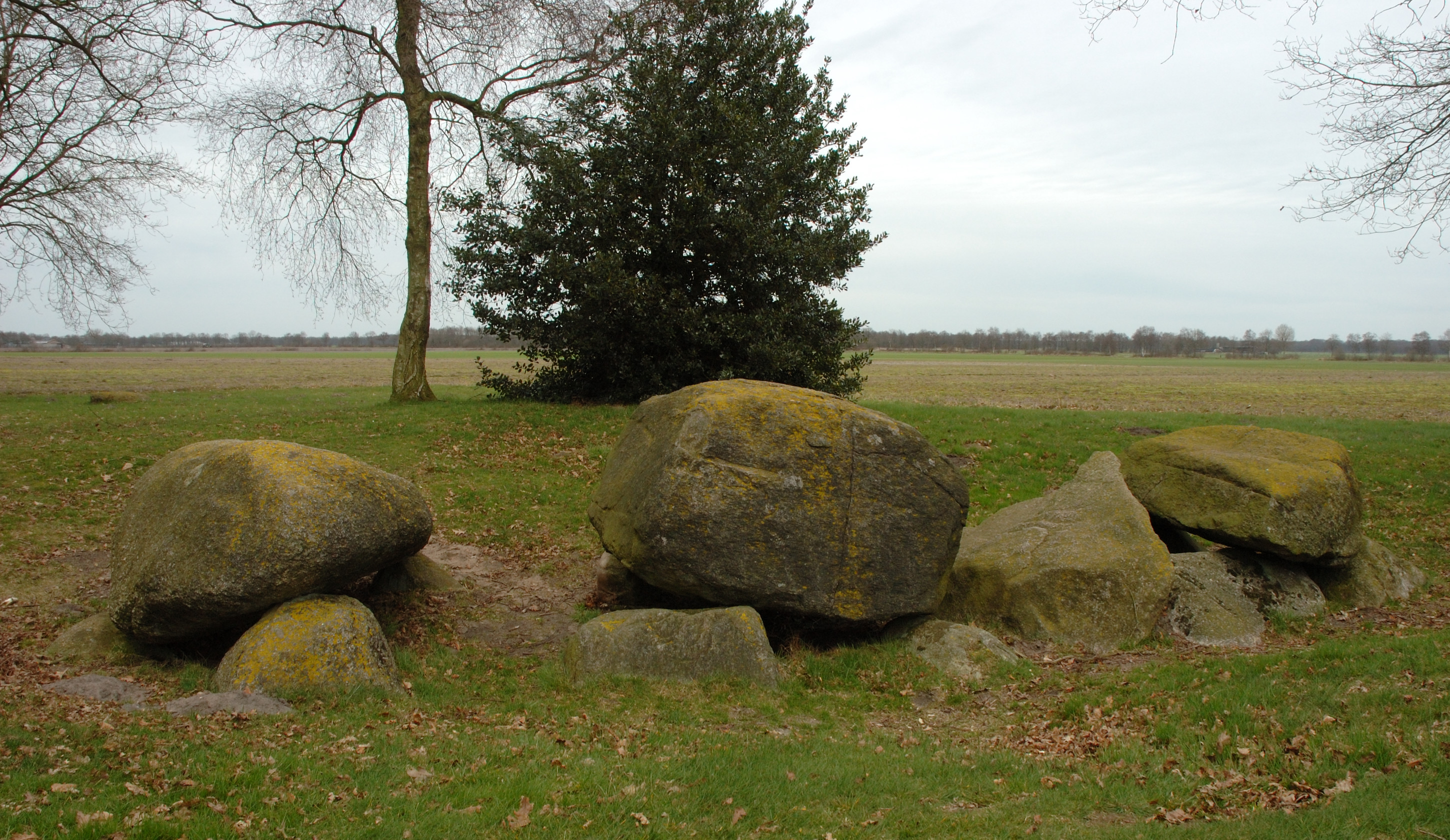
Hunebed near Zeijen.
