= Institute for Contemporary Art, Richmond =

Arts center in Virginia, US

Coordinates: 37.550253°N 77.449087°W

Institute for Contemporary Art at VCU
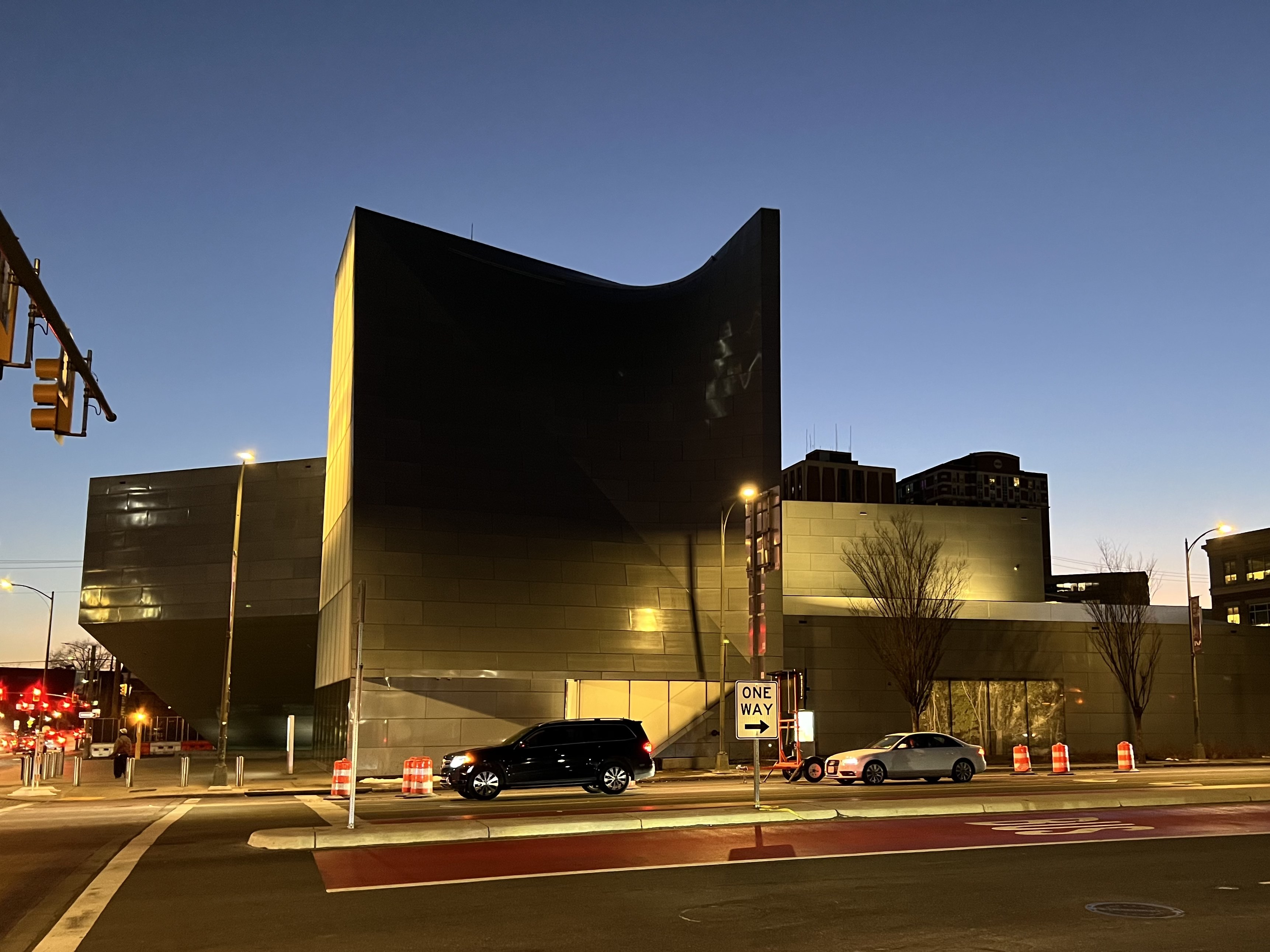
- Established: 2018
- Location: Richmond, Virginia, United States
- Director: Dominic Willsdon
- Architect: Steven Holl Architects
- Website: https://icavcu.org

Institute for Contemporary Art at VCU in Richmond (ICA at VCU), also known as the VCU Institute for Contemporary Art at the Markel Center, is an arts center at Virginia Commonwealth University, Richmond, Virginia. It was designed by architecture firm Steven Holl Architects, and built by Gilbane Building Company. Steven Holl Architects was selected from 64 competing architectural firms worldwide, along with local architect, BCWH Architects. Virginia Commonwealth University President Michael Rao, in announcing plans for the ICA in 2011, said that the prominence of the museum's location, "bordering the city's Arts District and in the Broad Street Corridor which links the VCU Monroe Park Campus with VCU's Medical Center" would have symbolic significance. The ICA opened to the public in April, 2018.

== Concept and vision ==
Planned as the city's signature noncollecting contemporary art museum with an international reputation, located at an important crossroads corner location of Belvidere Street and Broad Street, a center location in Richmond's lively art scene, the ICA chose Lisa Freiman as its first director. The Institute for Contemporary Art (ICA) at Virginia Commonwealth University in Richmond, Virginia announced in 2016 the appointment of the ICA's first chief curator, Stephanie Smith, formerly a chief curator of the Art Gallery of Ontario in Toronto. Lauren Ross was announced as the inaugural curator of the museum in Artnet News. Ross was formerly the curator of modern and contemporary art at the Philbrook Museum of Art in Tulsa, Oklahoma, where she organized the 2015 debut of the show Nir Evron: Projected Claims, the first museum exhibition for the Israeli artist. Ross brought the Nir Evron exhibition to the Richmond ICA in the museum's temporary on-campus gallery space.

Architect Steven Holl mentioned that the position and landscape of the museum itself would present "an inviting sense of openness". Architectural models of the Markel Center were commissioned by the ICA and created by An Liu, a graduate student in the VCU School of the Arts Department of Interior Design. Liu, an expert model builder estimated that he constructed more than 50 architectural models following his undergraduate studies in exhibition design at Nanjing Normal University in China. Liu's model of the ICA is a durable, moveable working scale model, which can be disassembled as a planning aid for the museum's curatorial staff.

== Funding the project ==
Beverly Reynolds, owner of Richmond's Reynolds Gallery (1946-2014), during her last years was a major donor and supporter of the ICA. In an interview Reynolds credited Richard Toscan, Dean of the VCU School of the Arts, with the rise of the school's stature from 25th to first ranking of art schools in U.S. News & World Report. Bill and Pam Royal and Steve and Kathi Markel were leaders of fundraising efforts to build the museum, and Patsy Pettus was a major donor with a gift of one million dollars to fund building the dramatic stairway designed by architect Holl. A videocam has been provided so that fundraisers may observe the building of ICA as it progresses. Artist Tara Donovan, a VCUarts MFA alumna, is an ICA International Advisory Board Member.

Steve Markel of Markel Corporation serves as vice-chairman of the fundraising committee. Other donors announced at the groundbreaking were The Martin Agency and a major anonymous donor.

== Construction ==
The groundbreaking ceremony took place in June 2014, where colorful paint was splashed from fork lifts onto the site, it was announced that the official name of the building will be the Markel Center at the VCU Institute for Contemporary Art.

The new ICA has been called "the most structurally complex building I have ever been associated with" by Richard Sliwoski, head of the VCU Facilities Management Division. By early 2017 VCU's Institute for Contemporary Art became a visible link between the old and the new in Richmond.

The ICA at VCU announced in the Richmond Times-Dispatch that its opening date would be October 28, 2017 and that the first show would be called Declaration.

== Inaugural year exhibitions and events ==
Declaration, scheduled for October 28, 2017 – February 25, 2018, was announced as the inaugural exhibition for the first season of the new ICA/Markel Center. Featured in Declaration are artists and performers Nidaa Badwan, Martín Bonadeo, Peter Burr and Porpentine Charity Heartscape, Tania Bruguera, Chim Pom, Andrea Donnelly, Edie Fake, Hope Ginsburg, Gwar, Rafael Lozano-Hemmer, Kate Just, Titus Kaphar, Amos Paul Kennedy, Jr., Autumn Knight, Lily Lamberta and All The Saints Theater Company, Cannupa Hanska Luger, Noor Nuyten, Geof Oppenheimer, Cheryl Pope, Paul Rucker, Curtis Talwst Santiago, Marinella Senatore, Jon-Phillip Sheridan, Deb Sokolow, Tavares Strachan, Betty Tompkins, Stephen Vitiello, and Levester Williams.

In 2016, while the ICA/Markel Center was still under construction, the James Branch Cabell Library at VCU presented ICA: A Forum of Ideas, a collaborative forum and exhibition for students about the interior and architectural design of the building, especially the first floor forum area and its staircase. This was a project of the ICA staff, the Virginia Commonwealth University's School of the Arts faculty, and BCWH Architects. A description of the video showing the group's hard hat tour of the forum area describes it as "a space defined by a lofty ceiling, curved wall, glass facade, and a sweeping grand staircase." The exterior form of the building uses sculptural blocks made of zinc and translucent glass.

In 2017 it was announced that the ICA's opening would be delayed, with a new target opening time of Spring 2018. Officials said the opening date was moved due to a "revised schedule for the completion of construction and acclimatization of the new building before the art can be installed." ICA Director Lisa Freiman said, "...it's a very environmentally sensitive building. It's a complicated building in terms of its engineering, and so we want to make sure that all parts of it are ready to go ...." Steve Markel concurred that the delay was necessary, saying, "I had the pleasure of walking through... The architecture and the design--it's really breathtaking to see the building itself. It's frustrating that we have to wait any longer, but it's very clear that this is the right thing." In October 2017, the ICA announced that an Ellwood Thompson cafe would be included in the interior plan of the building.

Late in 2017, the Institute for Contemporary Art designed by Stephen Holl for Richmond was listed by Architectural Digest as one of twelve buildings around the world designated as the "12 Most Anticipated Buildings of 2018", buildings which will "create an identity for their home cities." Other buildings on the list included a power plant in Copenhagen, Denmark, a green tower in Nanjing, China, and a library in Calgary, Canada. ICA director Lisa Freiman said that Holl wanted "to create a building like a musical instrument that can be played. When you think of that analogy, many instruments can be played many different ways, depending on the musician. As curators, we're looking forward to doing the same thing with this building." The ICA was named #1 of "The Coolest Things Opening in America in 2018" on the Thrillist website. Invitations to previews of the ICA were issued in March 2018.

== Advisory board and administration ==
In the fall of 2017, advisory board members announced were Steven A. Markel, co-chair; William A. Royall Jr., Co-chair; Melody C. Barnes, vice chair; and Marcia H. Thalhimer, secretary. In January 2018, Virginia Commonwealth University announced the resignation of the ICA's inaugural director, Lisa Freiman (Ph.D.), citing her intention to resume her scholarly research on the artist Claes Oldenberg and to remain in her position as a tenured faculty member of the Virginia Commonwealth University School of the Arts. Following the retirement of Freiman, VCU announced that Joseph H. Seipel, former Dean of the VCU School of the Arts, was named interim director of the ICA. On September 6, 2018, a new executive director, Dominic Willsdon, was named for the ICA. Willsdon comes to the ICA from the San Francisco Museum of Modern Art. He served at SFMOMA as curator of education and public practice since 2006. He served for five years as a curator of programming at the Tate Modern in London. At the ICA he succeeded Lisa Freiman, who stepped down at the beginning of the year, and will begin his new post on December 1, 2018. In 2019 the Institute of Contemporary Art announced that it would lay off 20 percent of its full-time staff.

== Exhibitions ==
The ICA's broadened vision for presentation of diverse media and its cosmopolitan approach to curation were welcomed as a public Richmond exhibition and event venue near the VCU School of the Arts.

In 2018 the ICA featured the artist Lee Mingwei's The Mending Project in its True Farr Luck Gallery space.

Great Force was an exhibition at the ICA which took as its theme the idea of great force expressed by James Baldwin and addressed "the force of whiteness, the counter-force of black resistance, and the persistence of the color line in the United States." The exhibition opened in October 2019 and extended through January 5, 2020. Exhibiting artists included: Radcliffe Bailey, Benae Beamon, Kevin Beasley, Alexandra Bell, Paul Stephen Benjamin, Sedrick Chisom, Tony Cokes, Bethany Collins, Aria Dean, Tomashi Jackson, Richard Kennedy, Pope.L, Charlotte Lagarde, Glenn Ligon, Mores McWreath, Troy Michie, Shani Peters, Robert Pruitt, John Lucas & Claudia Rankine, Paul Mpagi Sepuya, Xaviera Simmons, Sable Elyse Smith, Carrie Mae Weems, and The Racial Imaginary Institute.
