= Hanze University of Applied Sciences =

University in the northern Netherlands

- Hanze
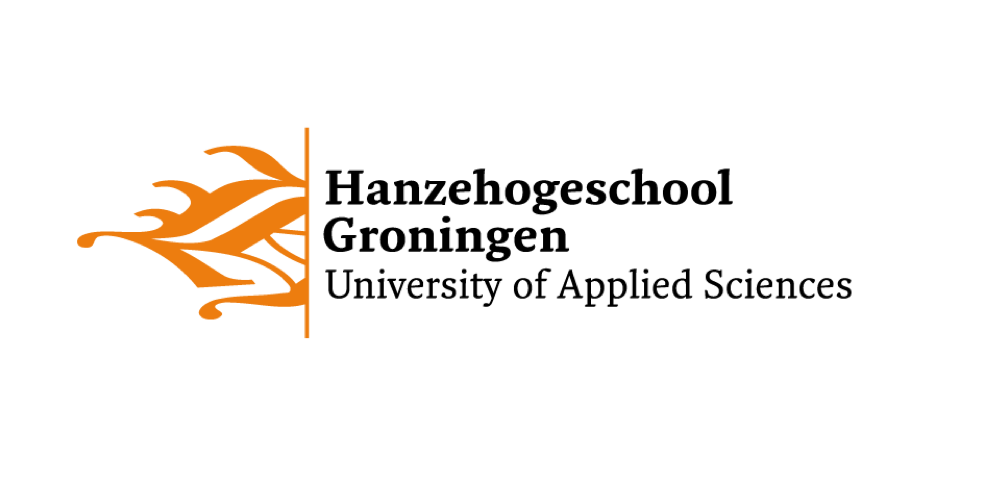
- Motto: Share your talent. Move the world.
- Type: University of Applied Sciences
- Established: 1986
- Dean: Dr.h.c. D. Pouwels
- Administrative staff: 3,700
- Students: 28,000
- Location: Groningen, Assen, and Leeuwarden, Netherlands; 53°14′25″N 6°31′55″E
- Campus: Zernike Campus
- Colours: Orange
- Website: www.hanze.nl/en

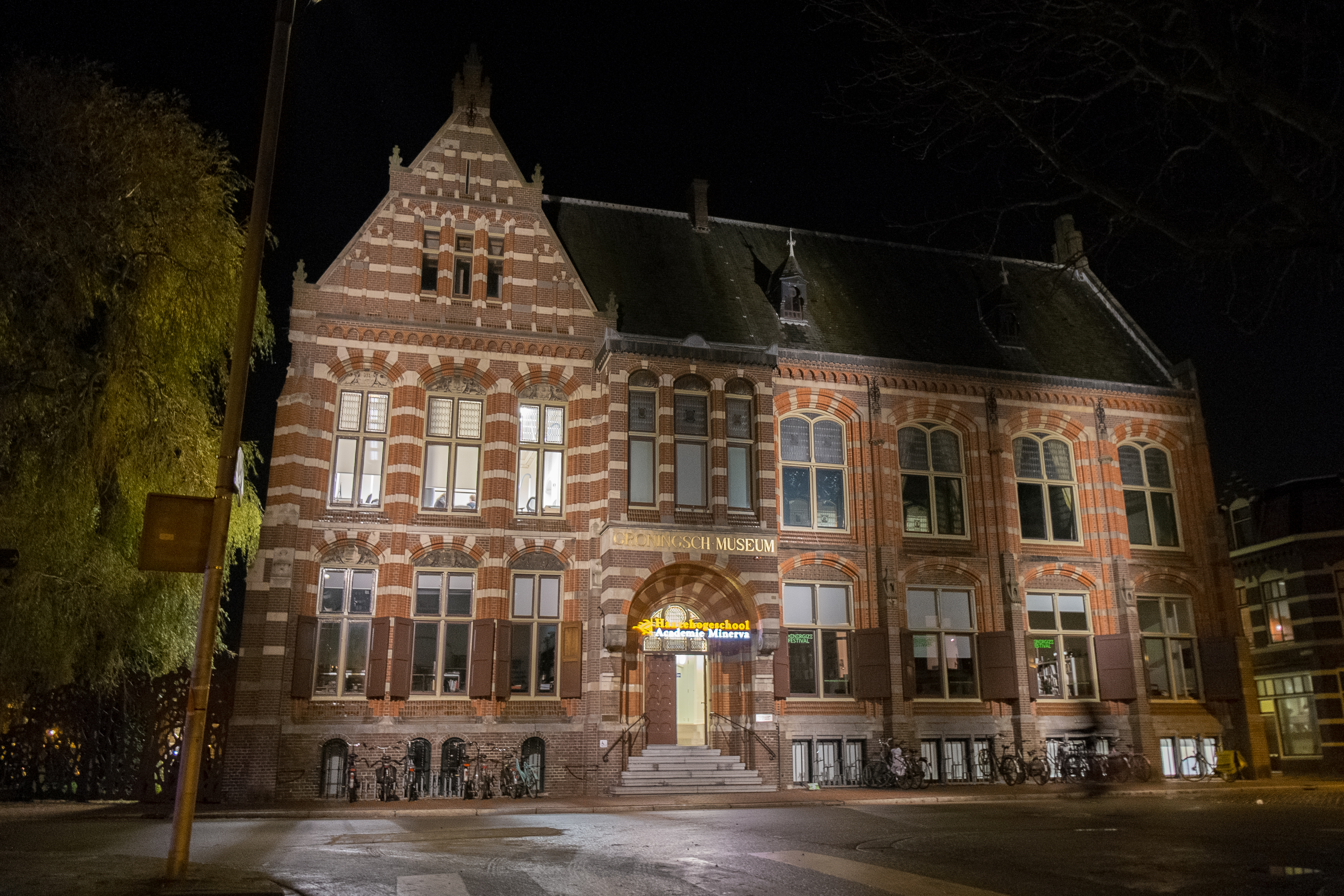
Minerva Academy of Hanze University of Applied Sciences in Groningen.

Hanze University of Applied Sciences (abbreviated as: Hanze UAS; Dutch: Hanze) is the largest University of Applied Sciences in the northern Netherlands and located in Groningen.

Hanze UAS offers various Bachelor and Master programmes in Dutch and English, and works closely with international partner institutes. The school counts approximately 28,000 students and 3,700 employees. About 10% of students are international.

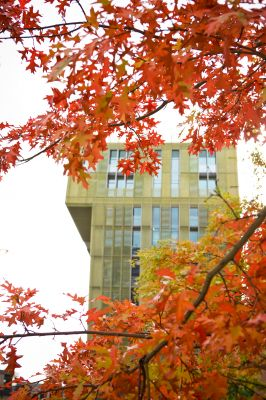
The van Olst Tower in Autumn

== History ==
Hanze UAS was founded in 1986 as the merger of various local institutes for professional education, the oldest of which is the Academie Minerva, founded in 1798, which was the first multi-sectoral institute for practical higher education in the Netherlands. The mission of the Academy Minerva was “The improvement of Drawing, Construction and Nautical Sciences, together with the aligned Arts and Sciences, within all ranks of society, and in particular to improve the skills of the disadvantaged." Throughout the centuries that followed many more institutions, engaged in a wide range of different fields, were established.

In 1986, Groningen was the first city in the Netherlands where 16 of the 24 vocational schools merged into a larger institute, as recommended in the government paper “Expansion, Division of Tasks, and Concentration in the Higher Educational System”. Hence, Hanze became quickly one of the biggest Universities of Applied Sciences in the nation and data suggests it is growing every year. In 1989 the university joined the Erasmus Programme and in 2014 Hanze became holder of the Erasmus Charter of Higher Education 2014–2020.

The name of Hanze UAS is linked to the Hanseatic League (Dutch: Hanze). Groningen, the city hosting the majority of the university's facilities, was member of the Hanseatic League between 1282 and 1669.

== Facts and figures ==
(from March 20, 2019)

- 28,432 students
- 8.1% International students
- 4.136 graduates
- 3,280 staff
- 54 bachelor's programmes (15 English or German-taught)
- 19 master's programmes (12 English-taught)
- 8 associate degrees
- 220 lecturers
- 99 PhD students
- Lecturers in Honours Talent programmes: 25

== Locations ==
Hanze University has the majority of its major facilities in Groningen, with few minor ones in Amsterdam (Dance Academy), Assen (Hanze Institute of Technology) and Leeuwarden (Pop Culture).

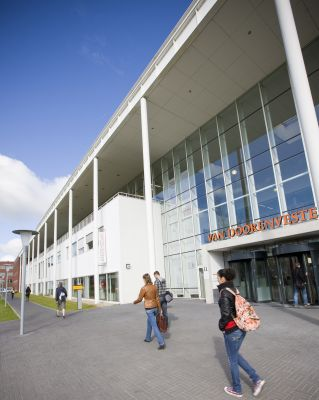
The ZP11 Van DoorenVeste building

The remaining 16 schools are located in the city of Groningen. With the exception of the oldest facility, the Academy Minerva, that is in the city center, all major facilities are in the Zernike Campus (Named after Frits Zernike). This large area north of the city (in the Noordwest district) is home to both Hanze institutions and facilities of the University of Groningen, the research university of the city. The campus overall hosts about 60,000 students.

University rankings

=== Schools ===
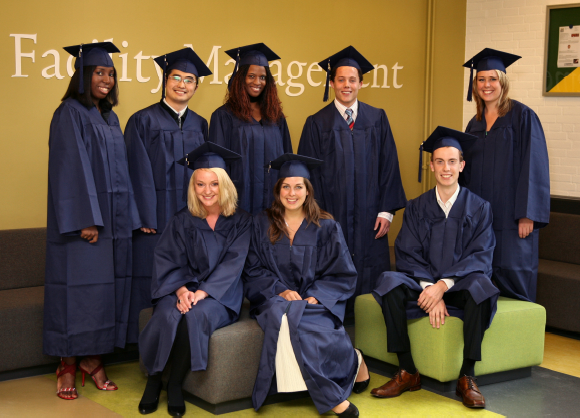
Graduates of IFM Groningen

- Academy Minerva, School for Fine Art and Design
- Academy for Pop Culture
- Hanze Institute of Technology (HIT)
- International Business School Groningen
- North Netherlands Dance Academy
- Prince Claus Conservatoire
- School of Architecture, Built Environment and Civil Engineering
- School of Communication, Media and IT (SCMI)
- School of Business, Marketing & Finance
- School of Education
- School of Facility Management Groningen
- School of Engineering
- School of Health Care Studies
- School of Law Groningen
- Institute for Life Science and Technology
- School of Nursing
- School of Sport Studies
- School of Social Studies

=== Bachelor programmes ===
- Sensor Technology
- Design
- Fine Art
- Classical Music (Prince Claus Conservatoire)
- School Music / Classroom Education
- Composition Music and Studio Productions (Prince Claus Conservatoire)
- Conducting (Prince Claus Conservatoire)
- Electronic Product Design and Engineering EPDE
- Integral Product Development
- Internationale Betriebswirtschaft German taught programme (BW)
- International Biomedical Engineering
- International Business
- International Civil Engineering Management
- International Communication
- International Construction Management
- International Facility Management
- International Finance and Control
- International Power Generation and Distribution
- Jazz (Prince Claus Conservatoire)
- Marketing Management
- Medical Imaging and Radiation Oncology (Dutch taught programme)
- Nursing (Dutch taught programme)
- Nutrition and Dietetics (Dutch taught programme)
- Oral Hygiene (Dutch taught programme)
- Physiotherapy
- Popular Culture
- Speech Therapy (Dutch taught programme)
- Sport Studies

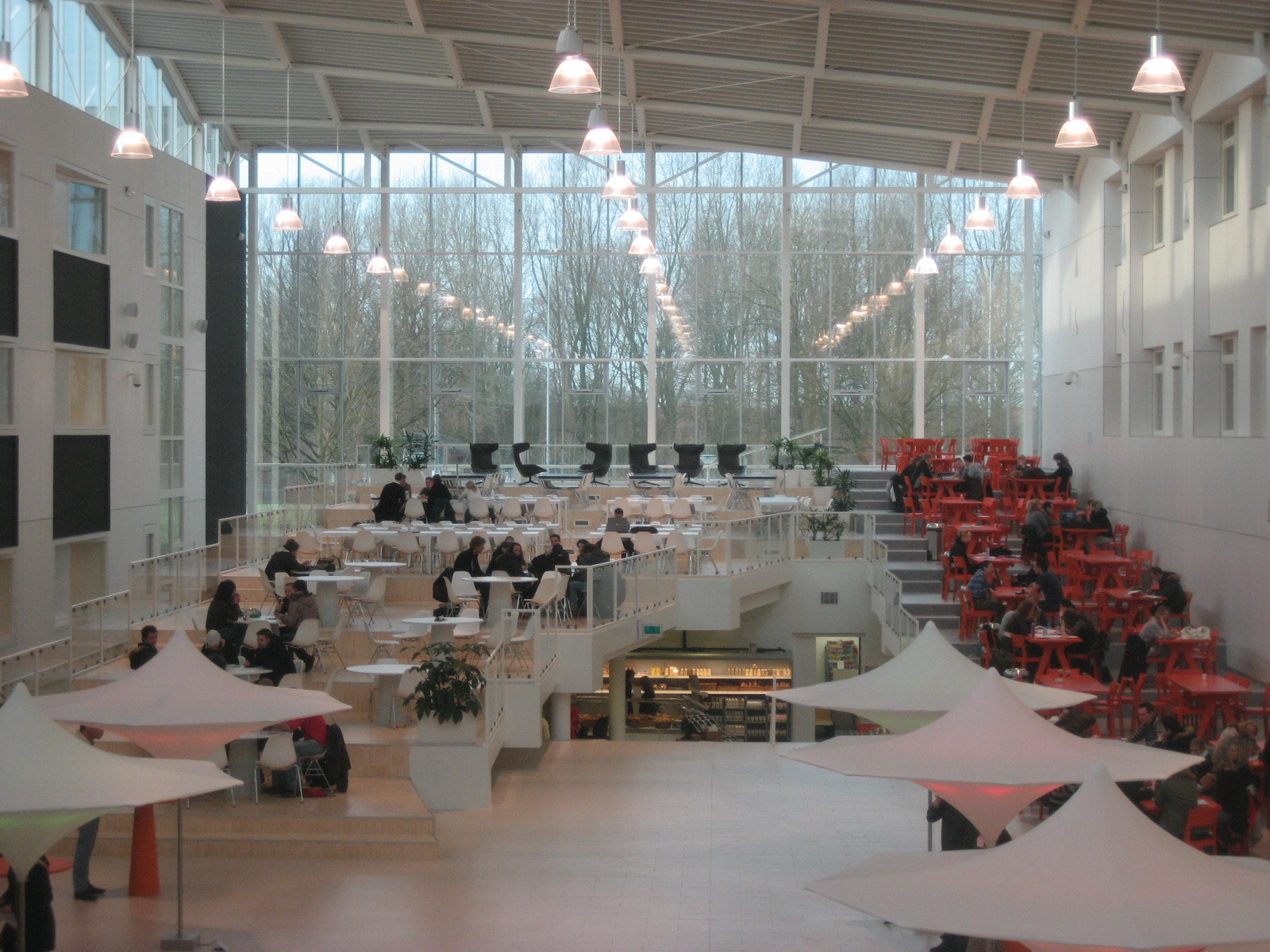
Hanze University Groningen Atrium

=== Master programmes ===
- Master in International Communication (MIC)
- Master in International Business and Management (MIBM)
- Master of Business Administration (MBA) (full-time and part-time)
- Master of Fine Arts Interactive Media and Environments
- Master of Fine Arts Painting
- Master of Fine Arts Scenography
- Master of Media, Art, Design & Technology (MADtech)
- Master of Music
- European Master in Sustainable Energy System Management (EUREC)
- European Master in Renewable Energy (EUREC)
- Master Data Science for Life Sciences
- Master Smart Systems Engineering
- MSc in Business Studies (Interdisciplinary Business Professional)
- Master Energy for Society
- Master in Architecture (part-time)

== Notable alumni ==
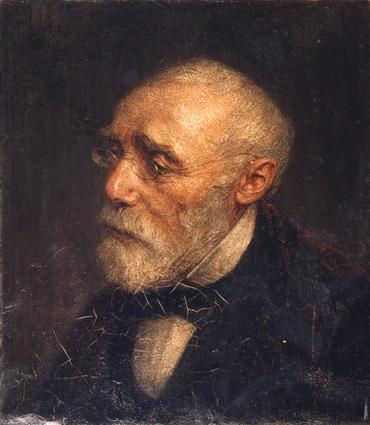
Jozef Israëls, notable alumnus of art from 1835 to 1842

Notable Alumni of the Hanze University of Applied Sciences (including students from the Academie Minerva) include:

- Wim Crouwel, Graphic designer
- Jozef Israëls, Painter
- Martijn Verschoor, Racing cyclist
- Alida Jantina Pott, Visual artist
- Otto Eerelman, Painter and lithographer
- Kimberley Bos, Bobsleigher
- Matthijs Röling, Painter
- Anno Smith, Sculptor
- Peter Snijders, Politician of the VVD (Mayor of Zwolle)
- Thomas Krasonis, Racing driver
