= Evert Musch =

Dutch painter

Evert Musch (Groningen, March 16, 1918 - Anloo, December 5, 2007) was a Dutch painter.

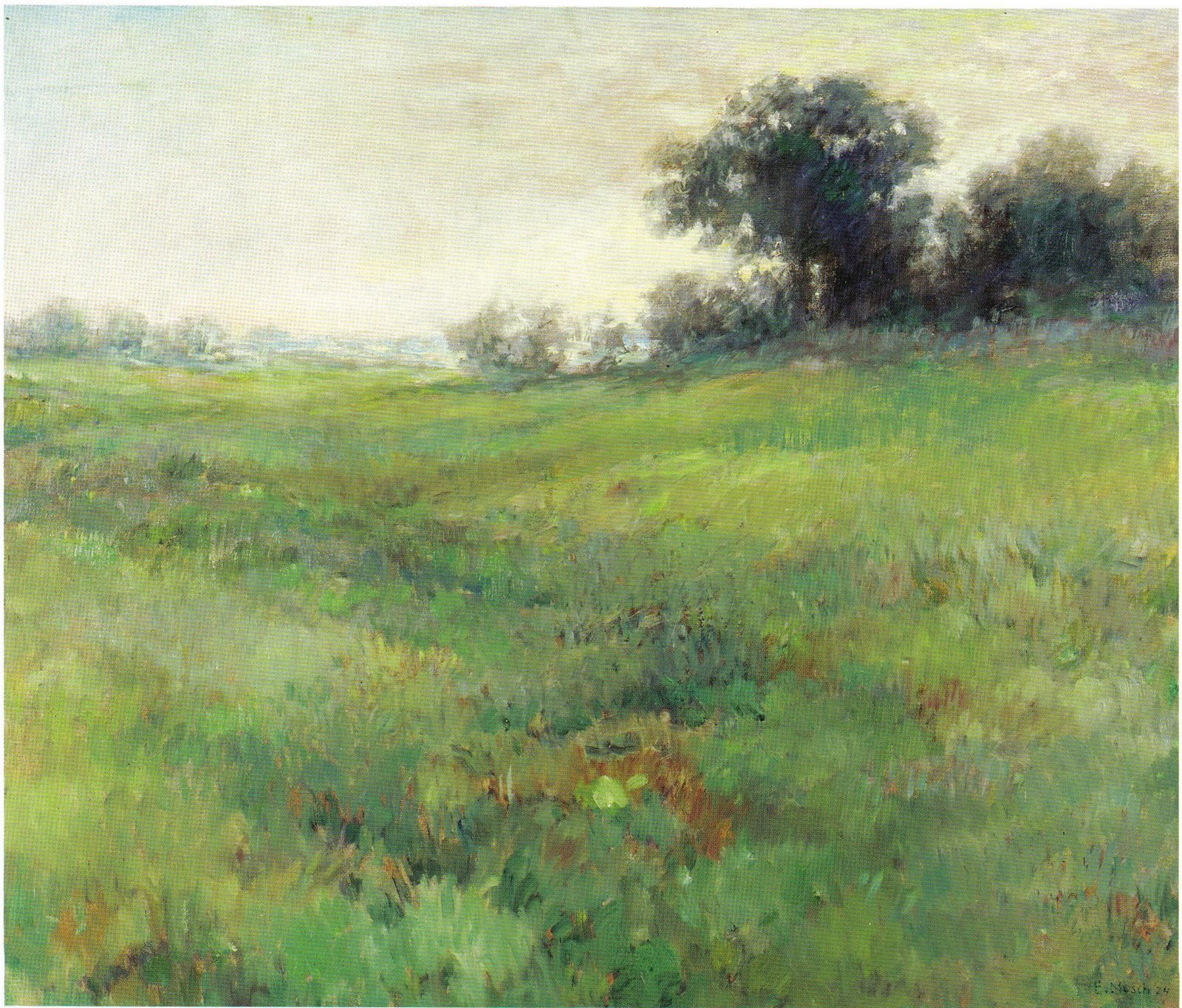
In the Drentse Aa valley near Gasteren, (1974). Oil on canvas, 62 x 73 cm, private collection.

== Early life ==
Musch studied at Academie Minerva (1936–1940) in his hometown Groningen, where he studied under Willem Valk, Arnold Willem Kort Kort and C.P. de Wit. From 1947 to 1981, Musch was lecturer at the Academy Minerva, succeeding his former teacher De Wit. He was a teacher of amongst others Henk Helmantel, Wim Crouwel and Martin Tissing. Musch married in 1943 painter Johanna (To) Jager, whom he had met at Academy Minerva. Musch was a member of the artists movement "De Jongeren" (1941–1942) and of the "Drentse Schilders" (1947–1953). In 1954 he was co-founder of the "Drents Schilders Genootschap".

== Later life ==
In 1985 he was awarded the Cultural Prize of Drenthe. The Drents Museum in Assen held a retrospective of his work in 1988.

== Themes and style ==
Musch made oil paintings and watercolors and his subjects include landscapes and portraits in naturalistic-impressionistic style. He also worked as a lithographer and illustrator of books, including "Kinderen in verstand en boosheid", by the writer Piet Keuning.
