= Academie Minerva =

Art school of Hanze University Groningen

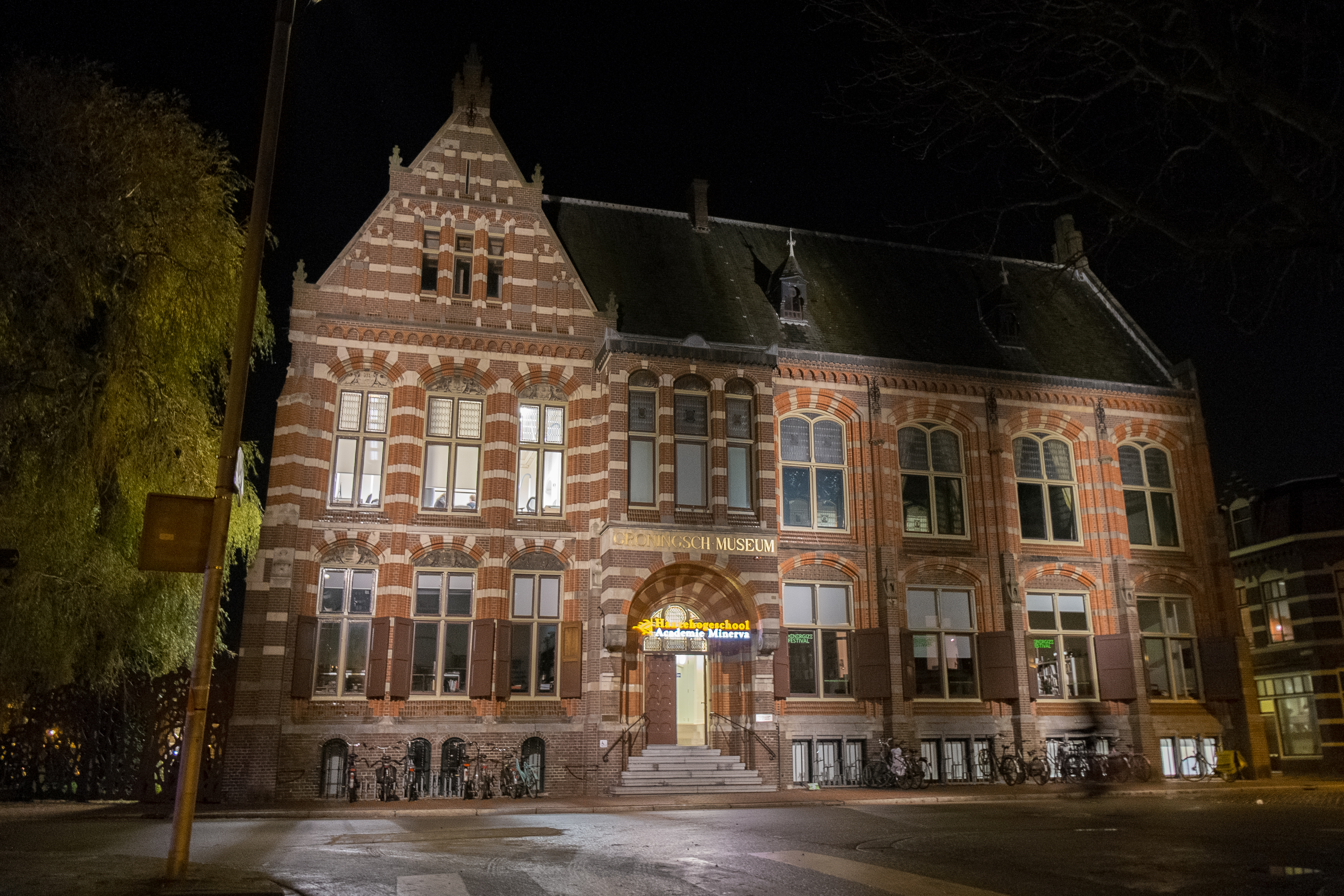

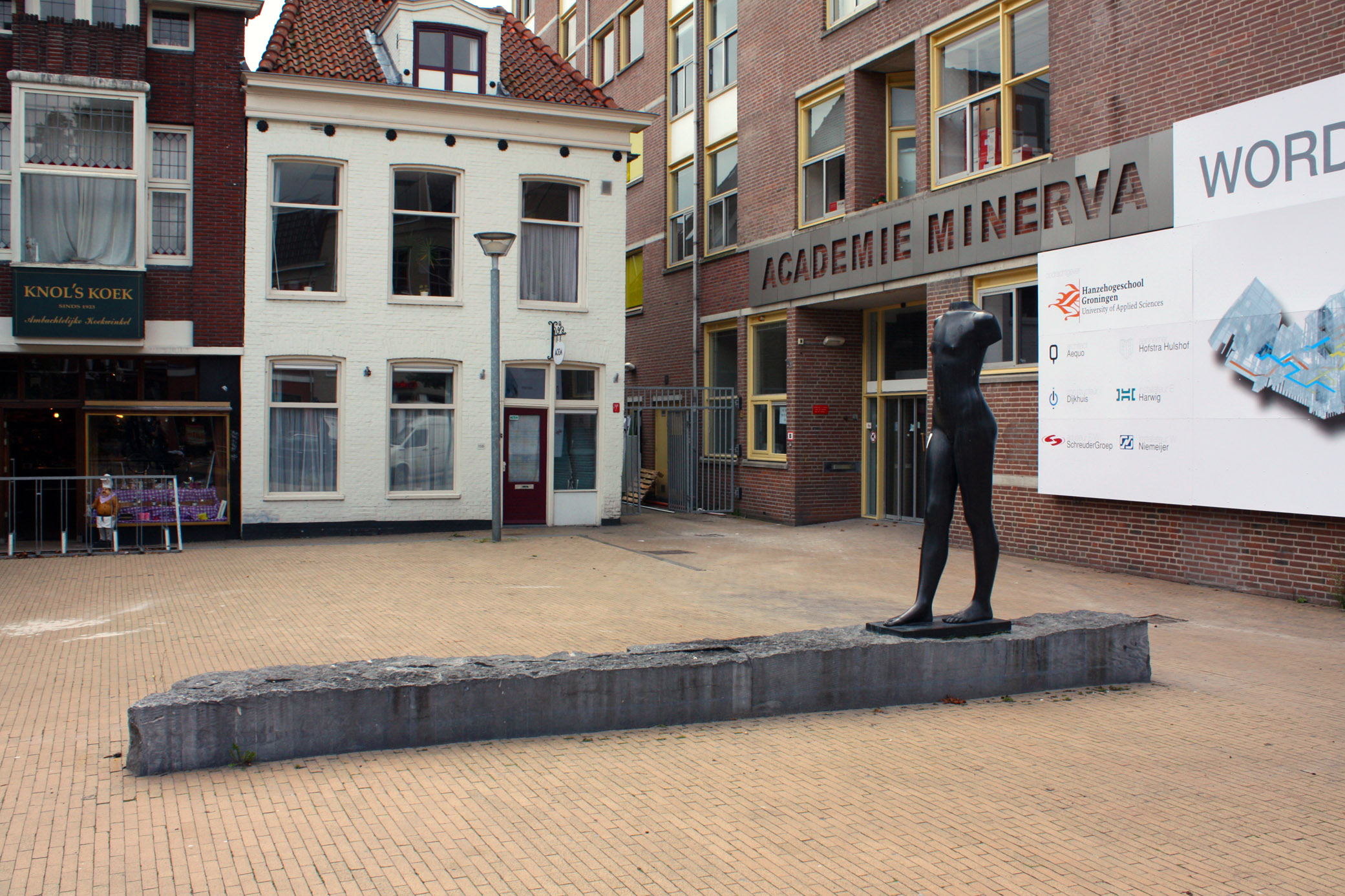
The Academie Minerva in 2011

Academie Minerva is a Dutch art academy.

The academy was founded in 1798 in Groningen as a school for arts, architecture, construction engineering, and seamanship. Today it is a school for fine art and design and part of the Hanze University Groningen. It offers three main fields: Fine Art, Design and Teacher of Fine Art and Design. The Leeuwarden based Academy for Pop Culture is also part of the Academie Minerva. This study has two directions, popular music and design.

== History ==
In 1797 six citizens from Groningen took the initiative to found a school in Drawing, Construction and Shipping. The first lessons took place in January 1798 in a building made available by the city. Gerardus de San was hired as the headteacher of the drawing department. In October 1798 the lessons in construction and nautical sciences started.

In 1820 the association Kunstlievend Genootschap ter aanmoediging en bevordering van teken-, schilder-, graveer-, en beeldhouwkunst was founded ('Art-loving Society for the encouragement and promotion of drawing, painting, engraving, and sculpture'). Here artists and art lovers from the city and surrounding area could receive theory and practical lessons. From 1824 they organized drawing and painting competitions. Initially only for citizens from the province of Groningen, but later for all Dutch citizens.

In 1838 the organization and school were forced to merge due to financial difficulties. The new name was Minerva. Because Minerva opened for artists from all over the country, there was not really a place left for art out of Groningen. For this reason, the Kunstlievend Genootschap Pictura was founded in 1832 to replace the old society, which among other things organized competitions for residents of the province of Groningen. From 1842 artists from all over the country could participate.

In 1857 the school moved and Johannes Hinderikus Egenberger became the new headmaster. In 1913 the academy was incorporated into a newly formed secondary technical school, with departments of visual and applied arts, architecture and the nautical school, under the name Gemeentelijke inrichtingen voor nijverheidsonderwijs (Municipal institutions for industrial education). The MTS was located in a new school complex, built under the architecture of Jan Wiebenga and Leendert van der Vlugt. The MTS (later HTS) and the Hogere Zeevaartschool (HZS) grew after the second world war, and left little space for the art department.

In 1964 the former applied arts school became an independent Academie voor Beeldende Kunsten (ABK) (Academy of Visual arts). In the years that followed, lessons were given in various places of the city. In 1984 Academie Minerva moved to a new building, designed by architect Piet Blom.

== Departments ==
=== Visual arts ===
Minerva is an independent art academy ever since 1964. Various members of the Groninger Kunstkring De Ploeg (1918) studied at Minerva, among others. The fourth generation of the 'Group of Figurative Abstraction', abbreviated as 'The Group', has emerged from the Minerva Academy.

==== Awards and stipends ====
The Academy awards several prizes and stipends every year, including the Coba de Groot Stipendium, George Verberg Stipendium, the Klaas Dijkstra Academy Prize, Academy Minerva Prize for Design and the Menzis grant.

==== Nautical science ====
The HTS and the HZS have long been a part of the academy. The HZS has now merged with the Maritime Academy "Abel Tasman" in Delfzijl, the HTS is now part of the Hanze University of Applied Sciences.

The Hogere Zeevaartschool Groningen was one of the larger nautical schools for both the Grote Handelsvaart (GHV) and the Kleine Handelsvaart (KHV) and the Maritime Radio Officer training. All basic courses and the so-called "ranks" were taught there.

Over 40 students lived in the (municipal) boarding school "Admiraal Van Kinsbergen", located on Noorderstationsstraat, during the two-year basic training. At the Academy Minerva, a sailor uniform was worn by the students of the basic training. This Maritime Academy has produced many merchant navy officers.

== Alumni ==
- Jan Altink (1885–1971), painter
- Wim Crouwel (1928), graphic designer
- Otto Eerelman (1839–1926), painter
- Pascal van der Graaf (1979), painter
- Simone Haak (1952), ceramist
- Henk Helmantel (1945), painter
- Derk Holman (1916–1982), ceramist and sculptor
- Tjaša Iris (1968), painter
- Jozef Israëls (1824–1911), painter
- Jan van der Kooi (1957), painter and drawer
- Geesje Mesdag-van Calcar (1850–1936), painter
- Awoiska van der Molen (born 1972), photographer
- Evert Musch (1918-2007), painter and drawer
- Bert Nienhuis (1873-1960), ceramist and jewelry designer
- Noor Nuyten (1966), multidisciplinary artist
- Alida Jantina Pott (1888-1931), painter
- Matthijs Röling (1943-2024), painter
- Anno Smith (1915-1990), ceramist, painter and sculptor
- Ellen Spijkstra (born 1957), ceramist and photographer
- Uko Post (born 1954), painter
- Martin Tissing (1936), painter and sculptor
- Wladimir de Vries (1917–2001), sculptor
