= Pascal van der Graaf =

Dutch artist (born 1979)

Pascal van der Graaf (born 19 March 1979, Dordrecht) is a Dutch artist who lives and works in Taiwan. He is best known for his landscapes, seascapes and still-life paintings painted in a variety of techniques. His work has been exhibited nationally and internationally.

== Biography ==
In 2001 Van der Graaf graduated at the Academy Minerva (Hanze University of applied sciences, Groningen) as an independent artist. After his graduation Van der Graaf received several grants for his paintings and won the prestigious Royal Award for Modern Painting in 2007. The Royal Award is annually presented to encourage talented young painters active in the Netherlands.

In 2015 Van der Graaf visited Asian countries such as Macau, China, Japan and Taiwan for the first time. These places inspired him in usage of their philosophy and art. He fell in love with Asia and decided to emigrate to Taiwan in 2016.

== Work ==
Van der Graaf is known for being a painter who uses many different techniques to give expression to the subjects he paints. He paints traditional subject such as landscapes, seascapes, still-life and portraits. According to van der Graaf “Painting demands commitment, it cannot be a neutral formalistic exercise”

== Grants and Prizes ==
- 2010 Projectsubsidie Nederlandse Ambassade Egypte
- 2008 Basisstipendium Fonds BKVB
- 2008 Nominatie Koninklijke prijs voor de Schilderkunst
- 2007 Koninklijke prijs voor de Schilderkunst
- 2004 Startstipendium Fonds BKVB
- 2003 Startstipendium Fonds BKVB

== Exhibitions (selection) ==
2016

- Kunstruimte Wagemans, The Netherlands
- Macpro Gallery, Macau.

2015

- We Like Art, Art Rotterdam, The Netherlands
- Kunstruimte Wagemans, Art Rotterdam, The Netherlands
- Das Buch, Galerie Roy, Zülpich Germany

2014

- Don’t feed the Animals, Galerie Tsjalling, Groningen The Netherlands
- Basement Project, The Basement, Groningen, The Netherlands
- NOK, Kunstruimte Wagemans, Beetserzwaag, The Netherlands
- Quake, Kunstruimte Wagemans, Amsterdam, the Netherlands

2013

- Drewes de Wit, Pascal van der Graaf and Jan Blank, Kunstruimte Wagemans, Beetsterzwaag, The Netherlands
- Bakkes, Kunstruimte Beesteszwaag, The Netherlands

2012

- Oude Helden, Academie Minerva, Groningen, The Netherlands
- NOK, Kunstruimte Wagemans, Beetserzwaag, The Neterherlands
- Art Amsterdam, Kunstruimte Wagemans, The Netherlands

2011

- Biënnale Cairo, Egypt
- Kunstruimte Wagemans, Realisme Beurs Amsterdam, the Netherlands
- Shaken not stirred, Hot Prospects!, Leusden, The Netherlands

2010

- Past - present – Future, Hot Prospects!, Utrecht, The Netherlands
- Kunstruimte Wagemans Art Amsterdam, the Netherlands
- NOK, Museum Belvédère, The Netherlands

2009

- Galerie Maurits van de Laar Art Rotterdam, The Netherlands
- Kunstruimte Wagemans, Beetsterzwaag, The Netherlands
- Art Amsterdam, Kunstruimte Wagemans, The Netherlands

2008

- GeM (Museum voor Actuele Kunst) Koninklijke Prijs voor de Vrije Schilderkunst, The Hague, the Netherlands
- Nieuwe Uitleenschatten, CBK Groningen, The Netherlands
- Apokalupsis Eschaton, NP3, Groningen, The Netherlands
- NOK, Nationaal Rijtuigmuseum, Leek, The Netherlands
- Gijs Assmann and Pascal van der Graaf, Galerie 10, Utrecht, The Netherlands
- Pascal van der Graaf, Ingrid van der Hoeven and Justin Wijers, Galerie Maurits van de Laar, The Hague, The Netherlands
- Laag 52, Galerie De Aanschouw, Rotterdam, The Netherlands

2007

- Koninklijke Prijs Voor Vrije Schilderkunst, GEM, The Hague, The Netherlands
