= Jan van der Kooi =

Dutch artist (born 1957)

- Born: 16 January 1957 (age 69); Groningen, Netherlands
- Education: Academie Minerva
- Known for: Painting, drawing, teacher
- Website: English website

Jan van der Kooi (born in Groningen, January 16, 1957) is a Dutch painter and drawer in the style of figurative arts. He is often regarded as the best contemporary Dutch drawer and painter.

== Education ==
Van der Kooi spent his childhood in Bedum. From 1980 to 1983 he studied at the art Academy Minerva in Groningen, where his teachers were Matthijs Röling and Martin Tissing.

== Work ==
After his studies, he moved to the province of Friesland, where he started to work in the area of Drachten. Van der Kooi paints and draws landscapes, still lifes, portraits, nudes and animals. Van der Kooi particularly focuses on painting sunlight in different places and climates, such as Peru, Nepal and Israel. Every year he visits Italy, where he studies the sunlight and landscapes of Venice and Tuscany.

Since 2007 he gives master classes at the Classical Academy for painters in Groningen, and since 2014 he gives master classes in the Middle East. An Israeli painter invited Van der Kooi to come and give seminars, because there are few classical painters in Israel and Palestine due to the region's relatively short history in classical art.

In 2002 the life and works of Van der Kooi were featured on the national news and a documentary on the Dutch national television; in 2004 the educational children's television series Het Klokhuis had an episode about Van der Kooi’s drawings of tigers. In 2007 his British friend and colleague Michael Reynolds invited Van der Kooi to participate in an exhibition of the Royal Society of Portrait Painters in London and later that year Dame Emma Kirkby and Anthony Rooley performed at the opening of Van der Kooi's exhibition in Museum De Buitenplaats in Eelde.

In 2009 the four Dutch figurative painters Matthijs Röling, Pieter Pander, Pieter Knorr and Jan van der Kooi were invited by a gallery owner in Antwerp to exhibit their works on a joint exhibition entitled The four greats from the north. In 2012 posters of Van der Kooi’s tiger drawings were displayed at Dutch national railway stations to promote the exhibition in the Dordrechts Museum.

Van der Kooi makes drawings in a book that was also used by Michelangelo and Raphael and which has been in the possession of Christina, Queen of Sweden.

== Exhibitions ==
- 1985 An art fair in Toronto.
- 2002 Museum De Buitenplaats| in Eelde. At this exhibition the book Jan van der Kooi, painter, drawer was presented.
- 2005 Exhibition at Laurentius in Middelburg. Presentation of the book compiled with animal drawings from sketch books Bestiarium.
- 2007 London: The Royal Society of Portrait Painters, following an invitation by the British friend and colleague Michael Reynolds, and an exhibition in Museum De Buitenplaats| in Eelde.
- 2009 Antwerp: The four greats from the north exhibition of the four northern Dutch painters Matthijs Röling, Pieter Pander, Pieter Knorr and Jan van der Kooi.
- 2012 Leonardo’s student exhibition at Dordrechts Museum, visited by more than 35.000 people. During this exhibition the book Jan van der Kooi, drawer, painter was presented. To promote this exhibition tiger drawings by Van der Kooi were displayed at Dutch national railway stations.
- 2013 A Frisian painter in Italy in Museum Martena in Franeker.
- 2014 Theme exhibition about sunlight in Museum Arti Legi in Gouda. This exhibition was opened by the Dutch comedian Paul van Vliet; Princess Beatrix later visited the exhibition.
- 2017 Double exhibition Meisterzeichner - Weltentdecker ("Master drawer - explorer") in Rheine, Germany.

== Books ==
- 1995 - Recent works (Recent werk). Jan van der Kooi & Jaap Bruintjes. Publisher Art Media, Amsterdam. ISBN 978-90-75370-01-0
- 2002 - Jan van der Kooi painter, drawer (schilder, tekenaar). Introductory written by Eric Bos & Diederik Kraaijpoel. Publisher Art Revisited, Marum. ISBN 978-90-72736-14-7
- 2005 - Bestiarium. Featuring an introduction written by Theo Laurentius. Publisher Art Revisited, Marum. ISBN 978-90-72736-42-0
- 2007 - Close at hand (Binnen handbereik). Compiled by Peter de Jong & Jan van der Kooi, introduction written by Pauline Broekema. Publisher Art Revisited, Marum. ISBN 978-90-72736-57-4
- 2012 - Jan van der Kooi drawer, painter (tekenaar, schilder). Frits Duparc & Nicolaas Matsier. Publisher Thoth, Bussum. ISBN 978-90-6868-608-1
- 2014 - Sunlight (Zonlicht). In conjunction with the theme exhibition in Arti Legi. ISBN 978-90-821617-3-1
