= Nicolaas Matsier =

Dutch novelist

Tjit Reinsma
- Born: May 25, 1945 (age 81); Krommenie
- Occupations: Novelist, poet
- Writing career
- Pen name: Nicolaas Matsier
- Notable works: Gesloten huis (1994); Het achtenveertigste uur (2005)

Nicolaas Matsier (born Krommenie, 25 May 1945) is a Dutch novelist. Nicolaas Matsier is a pseudonym of Tjit Reinsma.

== Prizes ==
- 1987: Zilveren Griffel for Ida stak een zebra over.
- 1995: Ferdinand Bordewijk Prize for his novel Gesloten huis.
- 1995: Mekka Prize for Gesloten huis.
- 2005: E. du Perron Prize for Het achtenveertigste uur.

== Bibliography (selection) ==
- 1976 - Oud Zuid
- 1986 - Ida stak een zebra over
- 1994 - Gesloten huis
- 1998 - Een sluimerend systeem (essays)
- 2005 - Het achtenveertigste uur
- 2011 - Met 4 3/4 kus - Brieven aan kinderen, maar niet alleen, translation of letters by Lewis Carroll.
- 2012 - Notities over de man en het werk, introductory essay in the book about the works of the artist Jan van der Kooi.
- 2015 - Op 't duin - duingedichten en duingezichten, a compilation with poems and essays illustrating how sand dunes have been a source of inspiration for poets and artists.
