= Matthijs Röling =

Dutch painter (1943–2024)

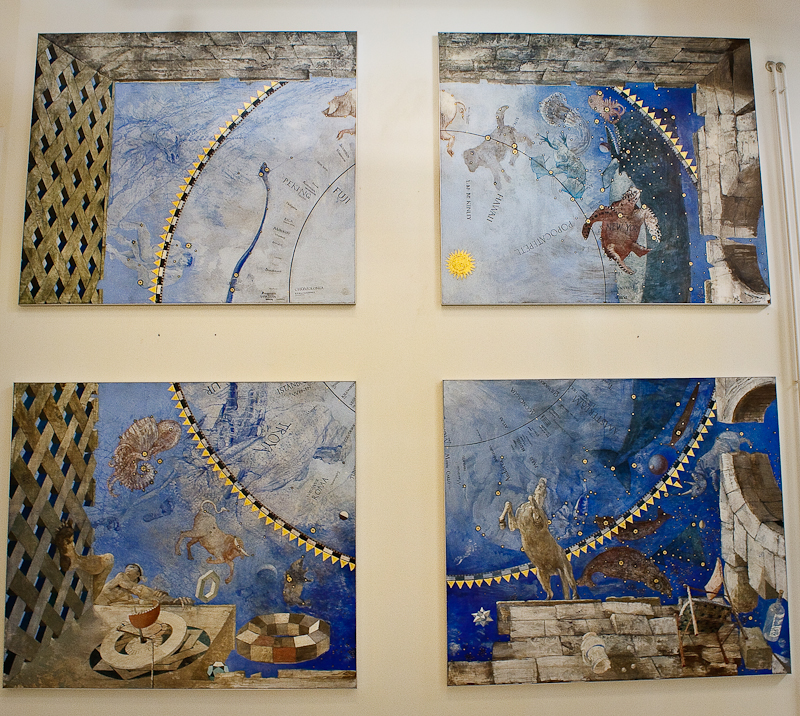
De Sterrenhemel in Café De Eenhoorn (1989).

Matthijs Nicolaas Röling (31 March 1943 – 10 July 2024) was a Dutch painter, active as graphic designer, wall painter, painter, draftsman, lithographer, pen artist, etcher, and academy lecturer. He is considered a kindred spirit of the 3rd generation of the Dutch Group of figurative abstraction. Röling is described as the "figurehead of contemporary figurative painting in the Netherlands."

== Life and work ==
Röling was born in Oostkapelle and educated at the Royal Academy of Art, The Hague from 1960 to 1963, and at the Rijksacademie in Amsterdam in 1963-1964. His first museum exhibition took place in 1965 in the Drents Museum in Assen. In 1972 he became a lecturer at the Academie Minerva in Groningen, where he educated Peter Pander, Douwe Elias and Jan van der Kooi. He also lectured at the Classical Academy for fine art in Groningen.

His artistic breakthrough came in 1976 with a series of still lifes, which he called cabinets. In 1983 he made his first big mural in the Nijsinghhuis in Eelde.

Along with Wout Muller he stood in Groningen at the cradle of the Northern realism. He made together with Muller in 1987, the mural "The tree of knowledge" in the auditorium of the academy building of the University of Groningen. Right down on the painting can be recognized the faces of Professor Bert Röling, the father of Matthijs, and Professor of Art History Henk van Os, initiator of the mural.

Röling died by euthanasia in Ezinge, on 10 July 2024, at the age of 81.

== Awards and honors ==
- 1994 – Amsterdam Award for the Arts.
- 1994 – Dr A. H. Heineken Prize for Art.
- 2005 – Sacha Tanja medal for Dutch Figurative Art.
- 2011 – Knight of the Order of the Dutch Lion.

== Exhibitions (selection) ==
- 1993: Galerie Mokum in Amsterdam.
- 1997: Museum de Buitenplaats in Eelde.
- 2005: Drents Museum in Assen, and former Scheringa Museum of Realist Art in Spanbroek.
- 2008: Marie Tak van Poortvliet Museum in Domburg
- 2014: "Artists choose artists" in Museum Martena, Franeker.

== Trivia ==
- Matthijs Röling was the son of jurist Bert Röling.
- Röling was a cousin of artist Marte Röling.
