= Bert Röling =

Dutch jurist (1906–1985)

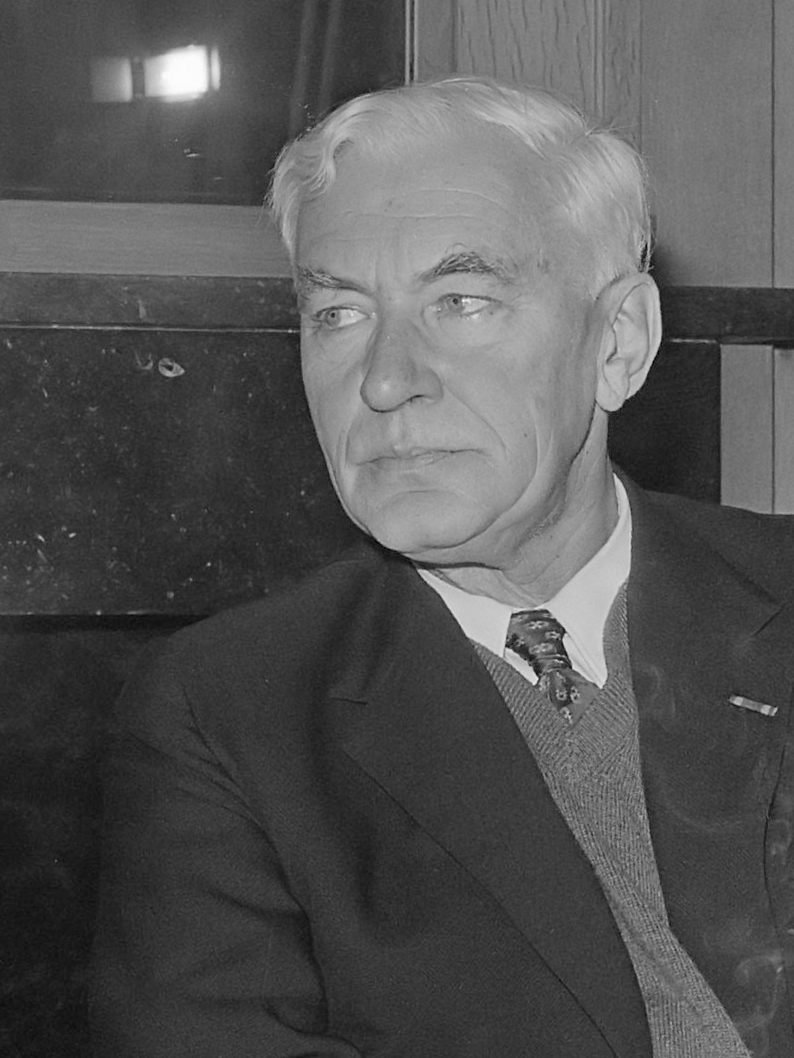
- Bert Röling in 1972
- Born: Bernard Victor Aloysius Röling; 26 December 1906 's-Hertogenbosch, Netherlands
- Died: 16 March 1985 (aged 78); Groningen, Netherlands
- Education: Radboud University Nijmegen, Utrecht University
- Occupations: Jurist, Professor of law
- Years active: 1933–1977

Bernard Victor Aloysius "Bert" Röling (26 December 1906 – 16 March 1985) was a Dutch jurist and founding father of polemology in the Netherlands. Between 1946 and 1948 he acted as the Dutch representative for the International Military Tribunal for the Far East.

== Childhood and education ==
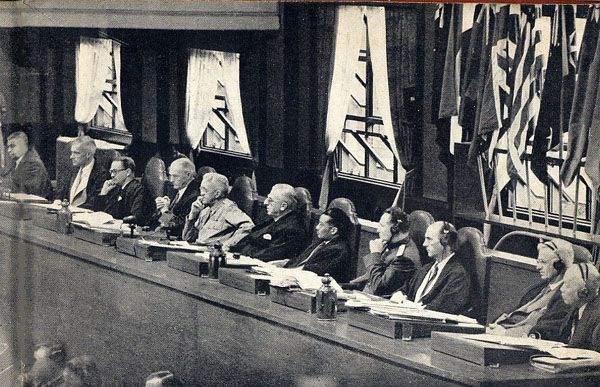
B.V.A. Röling as a judge during the Tokyo Trials

Röling was born in 's-Hertogenbosch as a son of journalist Gerardus Röling and Christina Maria Dorothea Taverne. He had an older brother, the painter Gé Röling.

Röling studied law at Radboud University Nijmegen and Utrecht University. At the latter he graduated cum laude in 1933 with his dissertation De wetgeving tegen de zogenaamde beroeps- en gewoontemisdadigers ("Legislation against so-called professional and habitual criminals"), awarded a prize by the University of Groningen.

== Career ==
Röling started teaching in Utrecht the same year and founded the Institute for Criminology in 1934 together with Willem Pompe.

In 1946 Röling was appointed member of the International Military Tribunal for the Far East. In deliberations with judges from ten other countries, he dissented from the tribunal's verdict that convicted Japan as aggressor. His views were shared by fellow judge Radhabinod Pal from India. However, under the rules of the tribunal, all verdicts and sentences were decided by a majority of the presiding judges.

In 1950 Röling was appointed professor at the University of Groningen where he founded the Institute for Polemology in 1962. He retired from academic life in 1977 yet remained active for the Institute until his death in 1985.

== Publications ==
- The Tokyo Trial and beyond. Reflections of a peacemonger. Ed. and with an introd. by Antonio Cassese. Cambridge, Polity Press, 1993. ISBN 0-7456-1006-4
- Völkerrecht und Friedenswissenschaft. (Carl-von-Ossietzky-Vorlesung) Bonn-Bad Godesberg, Deutsche Gesellschaft für Friedens- und Konfliktforschung, 1974
- Polemologie. Een inleiding tot de wetenschap van oorlog en vrede. Assen, Van Gorcum 1973. ISBN 90-232-1076-X
- The Tokyo judgement. APA Univ. Press Amsterdam 1977, ISBN 90-6042-040-3.
- The 1974 U.N. definition of aggression. In: Antonio Cassese: The current legal regulation of the use of force. Nijhoff, Dordrecht 1986, ISBN 90-247-3247-6, p. 413–421.
- Crimes against peace. In: Antonio Cassese: The current legal regulation of the use of force. Nijhoff, Dordrecht 1986, ISBN 90-247-3247-6, p. 385–394.

== Family ==
Bert Röling is the father of professor of architecture Wiek Röling and of painter Matthijs Röling as well as the uncle of artist Marte Röling. Hugo Röling, another son, wrote a book about his father during the period as judge at the Tokyo War Crimes Tribunal.

== In popular culture ==
- Röling's experiences during the Tokyo Trials acted as inspiration for the novel De Offers (The Sacrifices) of writer Kees van Beijnum. In the novel the judge is called Rem Brink. On 14 December 2014, the Dutch daily newspaper, De Volkskrant, revealed that the author made several changes to his book ahead of publication to accommodate the grievances of judge Röling's son and dubbed the controversy "the literary scandal of 2014".
- Röling was portrayed by Dutch actor Marcel Hensema in the 2016 NHK miniseries Tokyo Trial.
