= International Business School Groningen =

IBS Groningen
- Motto: Share your talent. Move the world
- Type: University of Applied Sciences
- Established: 1988
- Affiliations: [EQUIS]
- Dean: Bram ten Kate
- Students: 1100
- Location: Groningen, The Netherlands; 53°14′25.85″N 6°31′57.73″E
- Campus: Zernike Campus
- Website: IBS Groningen

The International Business School Groningen is the business school of the Hanze University Groningen in Groningen, Netherlands.

The International Business and Management Studies (IBMS) Programme of the Hanze University of Applied Sciences, Groningen, founded in 1988, is one of the oldest International Business Schools in the Netherlands. Approximately 60% of IBMS' students come from outside the Netherlands and over 40 nationalities are represented. Classes are taught in English or German by a multinational group of staff members with diverse international backgrounds.

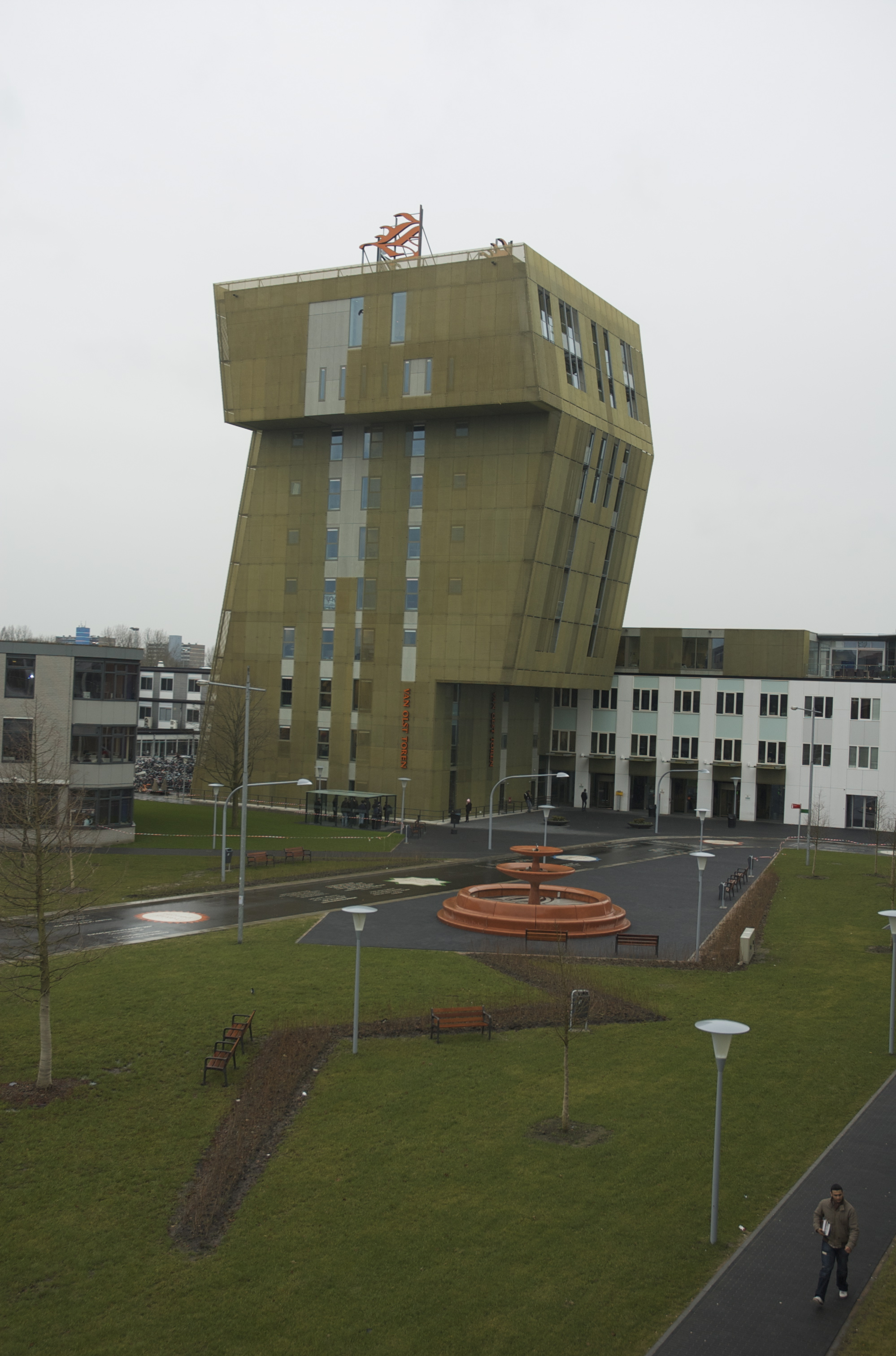
Van Olst Tower located at the Zernike complex

International Business and Management Studies graduates obtain an internationally recognized Bachelor of Business Administration degree.

== Academic year ==
IBMS is a four-year programme and each year consists of two study semesters. Each semester is divided into two ten-week periods including an exam period at the end of each period. The academic year usually starts at 1 September and ends after four study blocks at the end of June.

== Bachelor Programmes ==
- International Business & Management Studies (IBMS)

== Master Programmes ==
- Master of Business Administration
