= Anno Smith =

Dutch artist

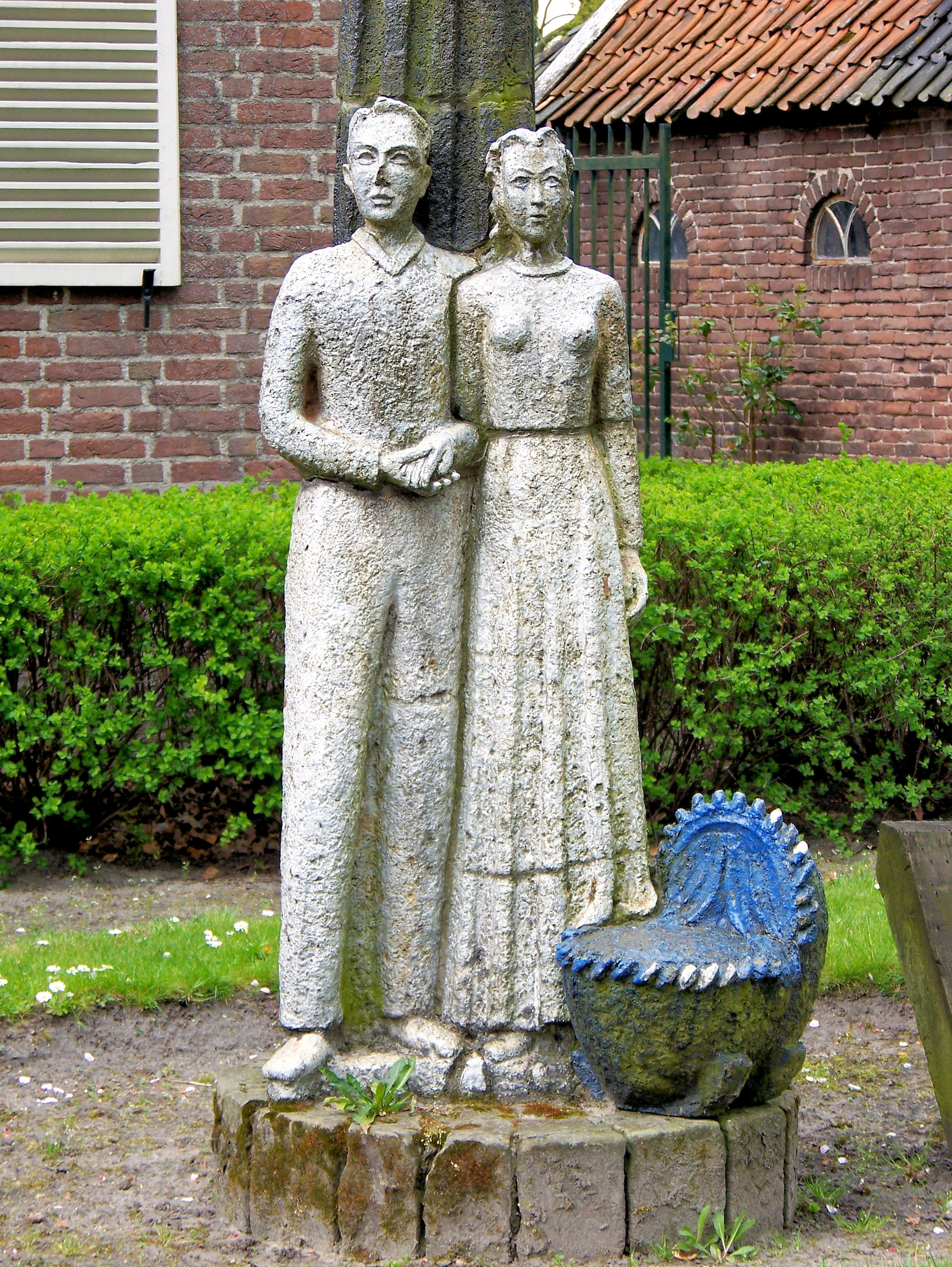
"Life" in Diever, 1959.

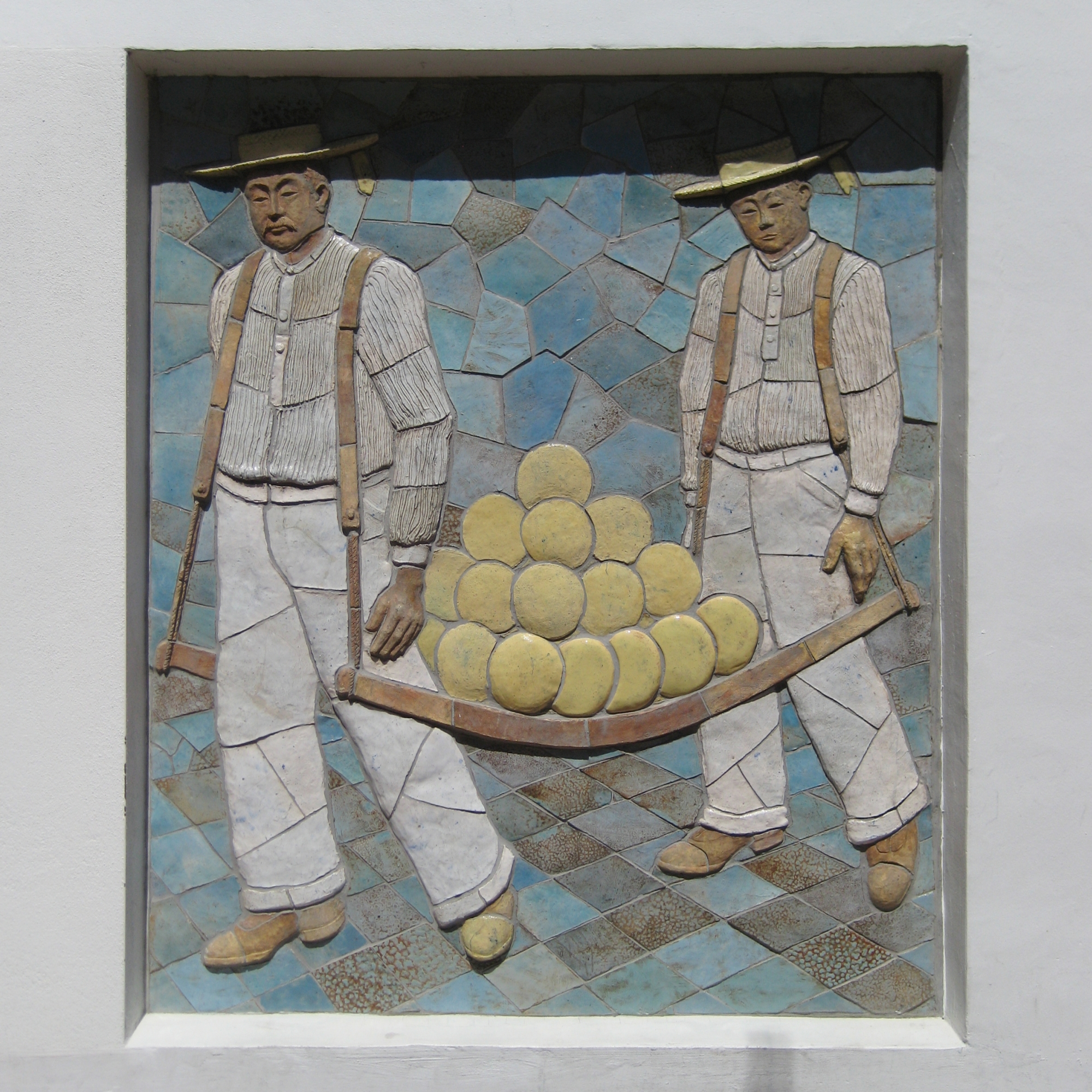
Relief De Alkmaarse Kaasdragers, Groningen, 1940s–50s.

Ferdinand Anno (Anno) Smith (7 April 1915 in Groningen – 14 January 1990 in Groningen) was a Dutch artist, who worked as ceramist, painter, sculptor and art teacher.

== Life and work ==
Smith was the youngest in a family of eight children. His parents were grocers in Groningen. Smith was trained as a carpenter at the technical school, after which he joined the Academie Minerva. Here he was taught by Willem Valk, Arnold Willem Kort and Cornelis Pieter de Wit. Smith would later also teach at Minerva.

After his education, Smith was employed as a potter since 1937. In 1938–1939, he exhibited at Pictura with its pottery. After a study trip to Italy, Smith began to focus on making stone carvings and wall decorations. He also made some freestanding ceramic figures, such as Life on the Brink in Diever (see image).

In the years after the war people worked hard to rebuild, while there was also demand for beautification of the buildings. Smith provided tableaus and wall decoration for condominiums, schools, shops and other buildings in the residential areas of Groningen, such as the Grunobuurt, Helpman, Indische buurt en De Wijert.

Smith did not only work for the city of Groningen. His work can be found throughout North Netherlands, as in Hoogkerk, Leeuwarden, Oosterwolde, Peize, Sneek, Termunterzijl and Zuidhorn.

There are also reliefs of Smith outside North Netherlands. In 1955 he made a relief of four athletes and a ball for a gymnasium. For two schools in Gouda he made reliefs respectively Rumpelstiltskin and Pinkeltje. In Hardenberg a ceramic representation can be seen on the creation myth on the hall of the Greijdanus College. After the demolition of the school's artwork was displayed on the plaza at the new school.

== See also ==
- List of Dutch ceramists
