= Hanze Institute of Technology =

Part of the Hanze University Groningen in the Netherlands

Institute of Engineering Assen
- Motto: Turning Ambition into Success
- Type: University of Applied Sciences
- Established: 2008
- Location: (Netherlands) Assen, Netherlands
- Website: hanze.nl

The Institute of Engineering Assen is part of the Hanze University Groningen in the Netherlands. The institute is based in Assen where it offers a Bachelor Programme in Electrical and Electronic Engineering and a Master Programme in Sensor System Engineering. It started in September 2008 as a European pioneer in the field of sensor technology education, and is working closely together with partners such as Astron and the Nederlandse Aardolie Maatschappij BV (NAM) / Shell. From 2019, the first year students of the Bachelor were moved in Groningen's Zernike Campus, were the majority of the Hanze faculties are present.

The Electrical and Electronic Engineering Sensor Technology course has been selected seven times in a row (2019 included) as a Top Rated Programme in the Keuzegids HBO.

== Photos ==
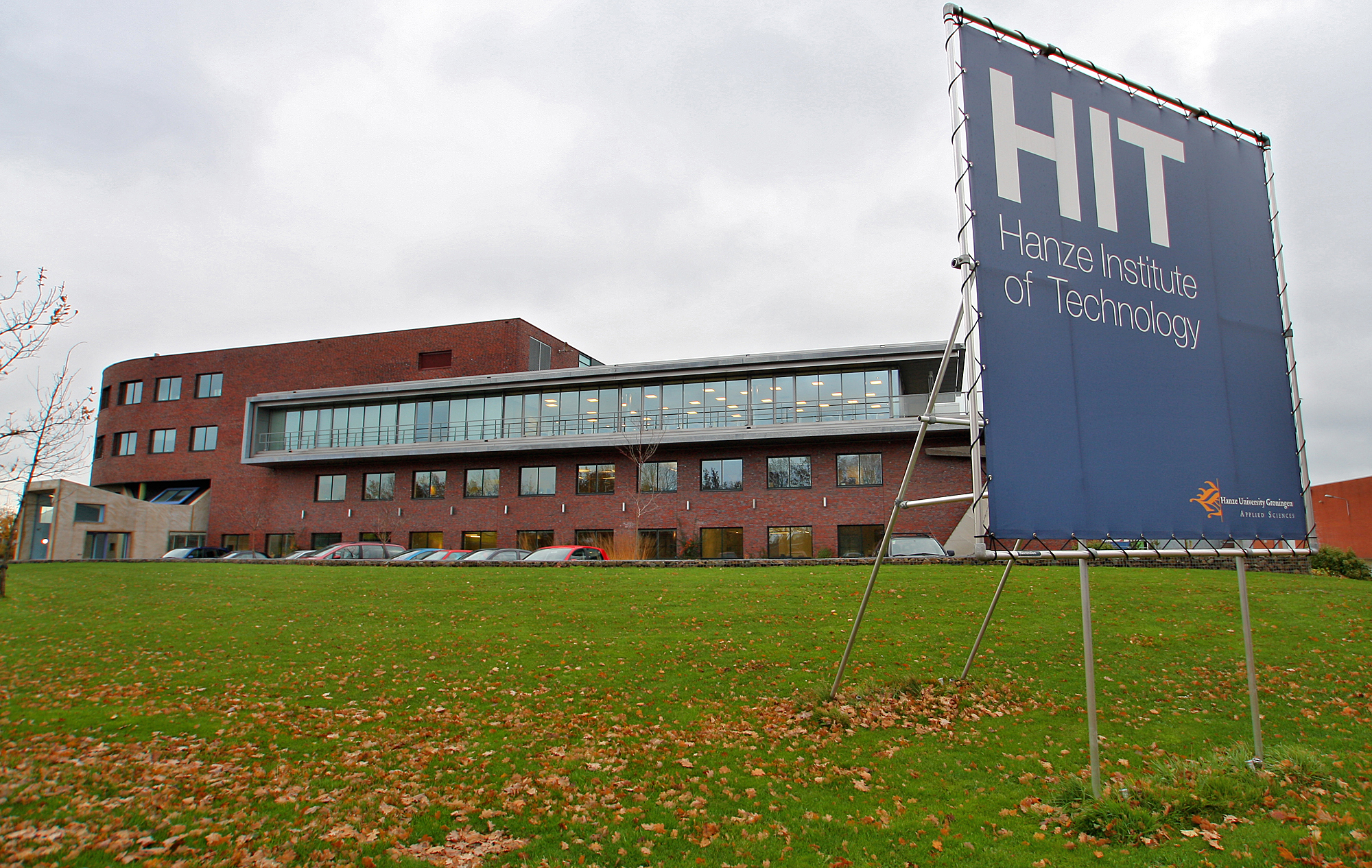
The HIT-building seen from bypassing road.

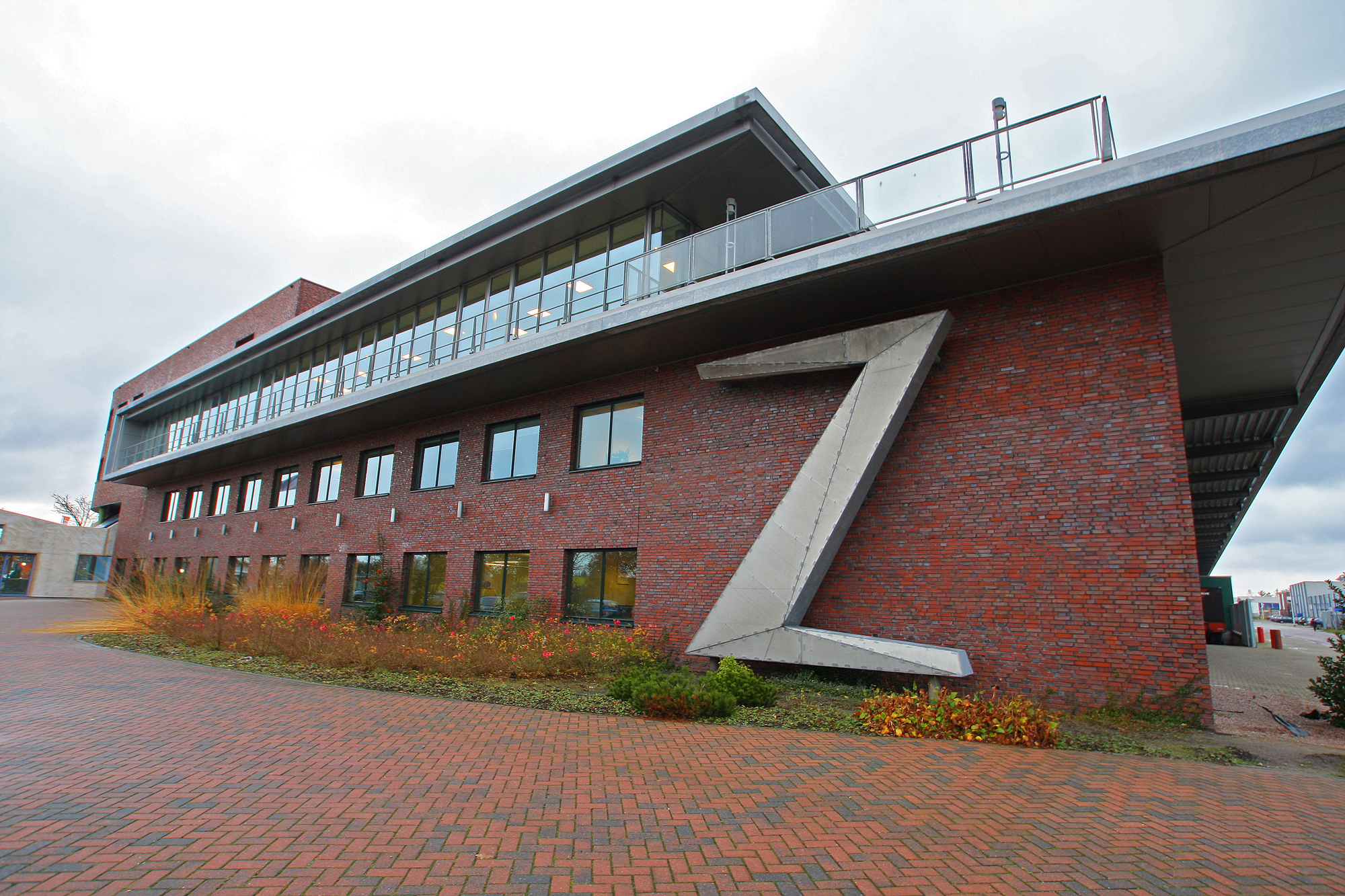
Close-up view of the HIT-building.

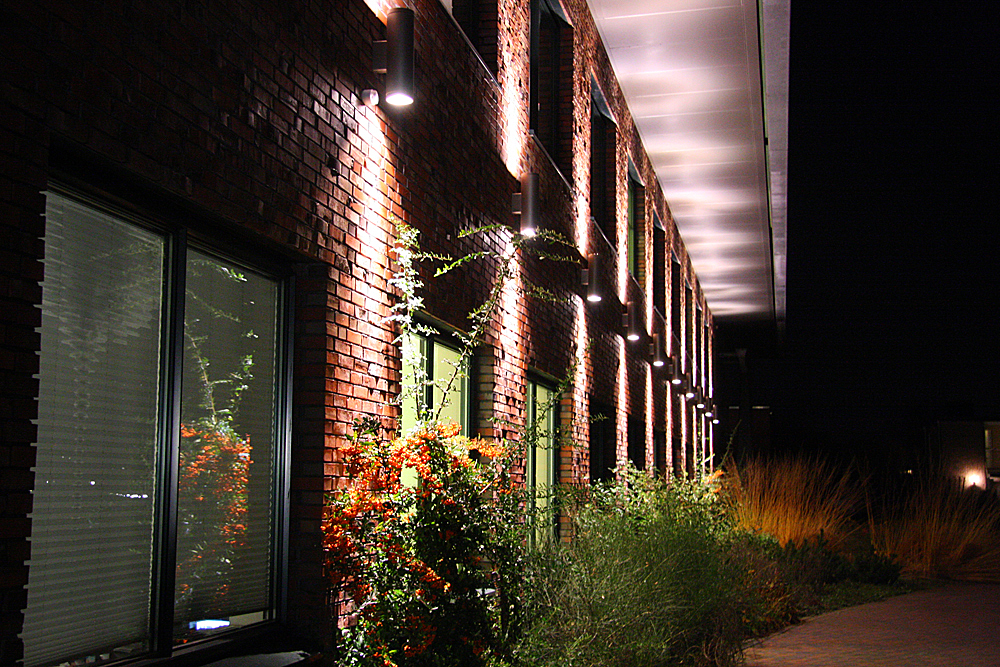
Close-up view of the HIT-building at night.

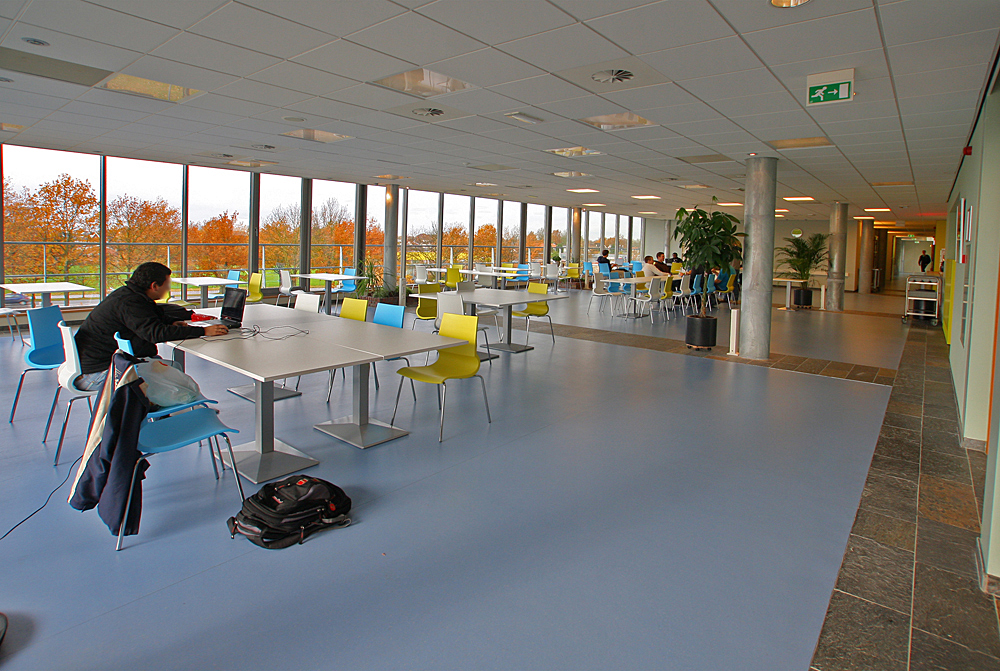
View of the canteen.

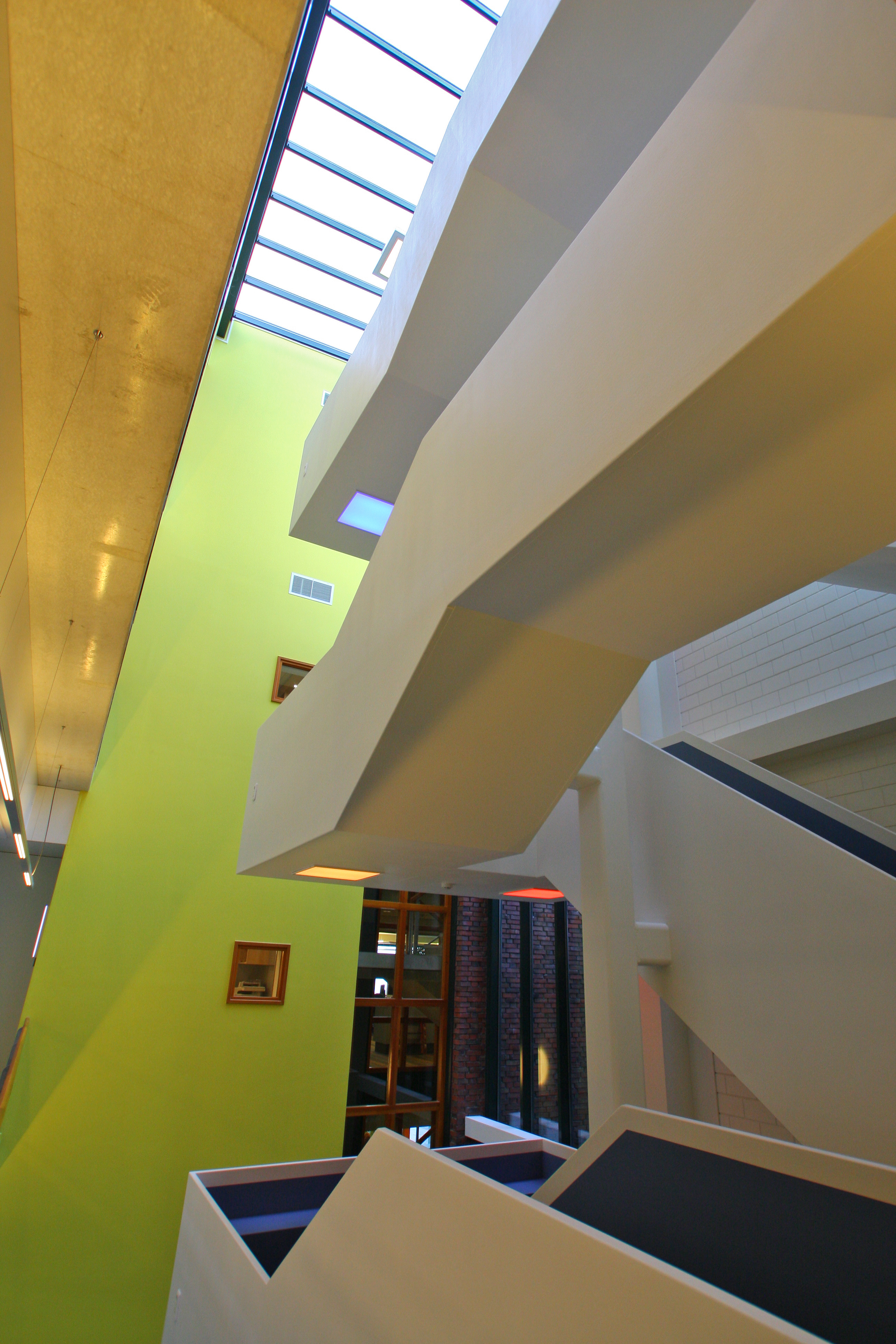
View of the staircase.

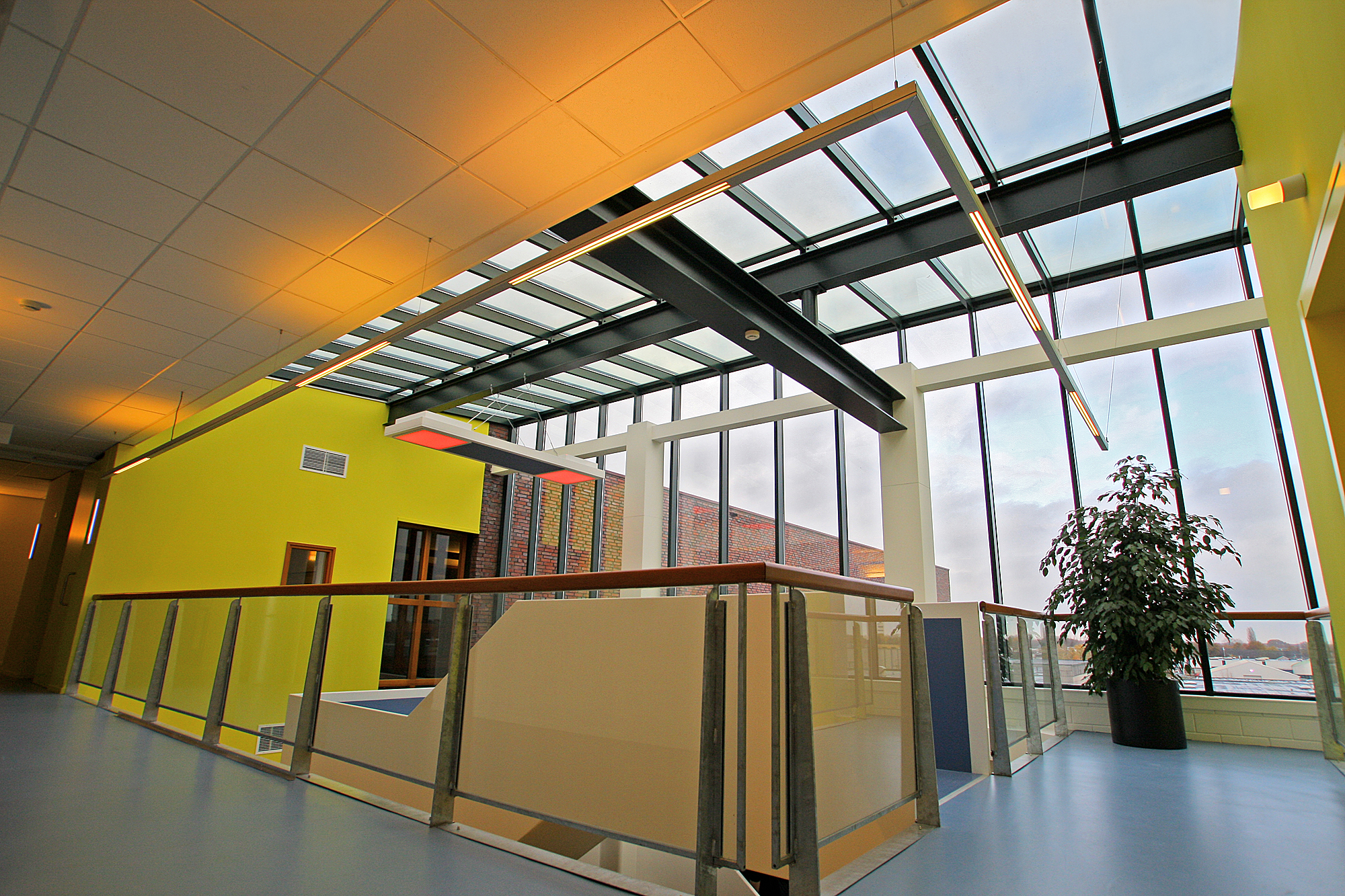
View of a part of the third floor.

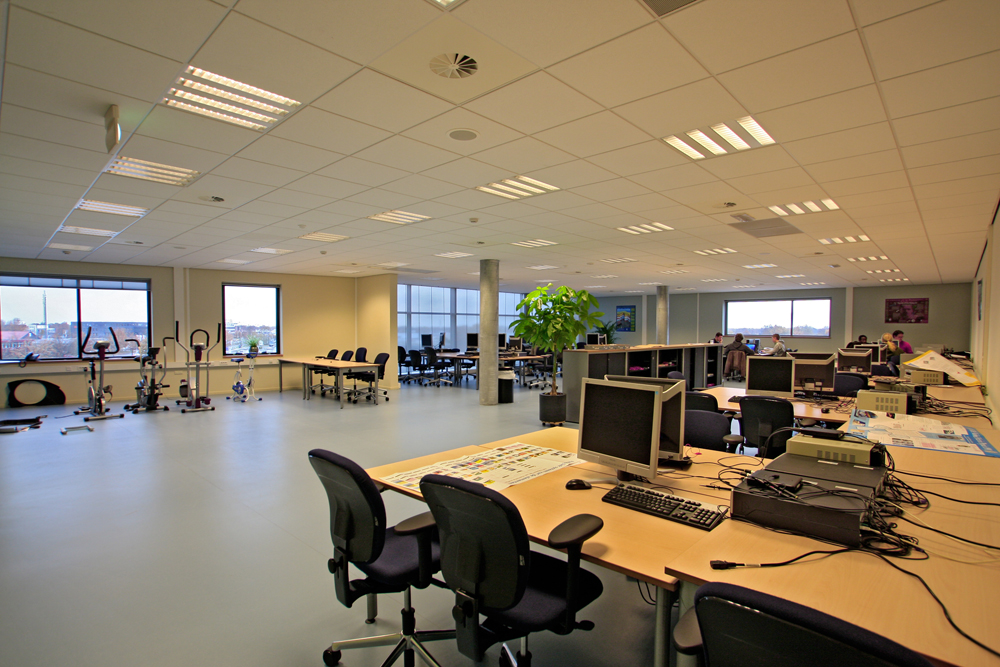
View of 'Silicon Valley', a multi-purpose working area.

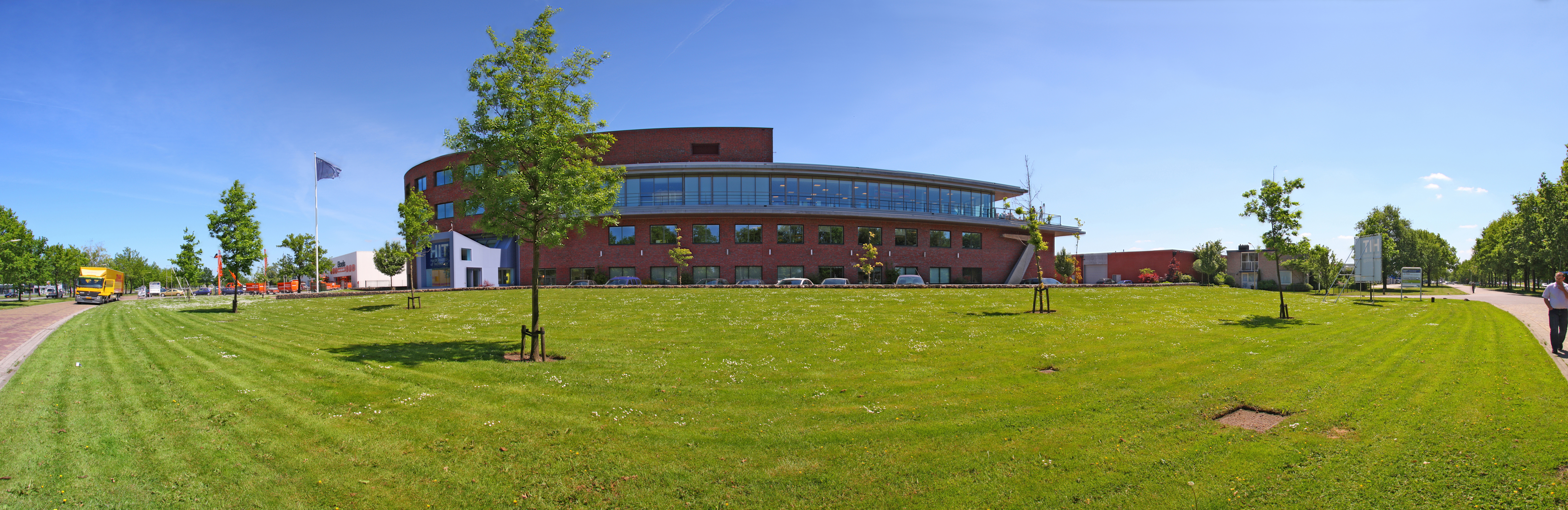
180 degree view of Hanze Institute of Technology building and its surroundings.
