= Marte Röling =

Dutch artist and actress (born 1939)

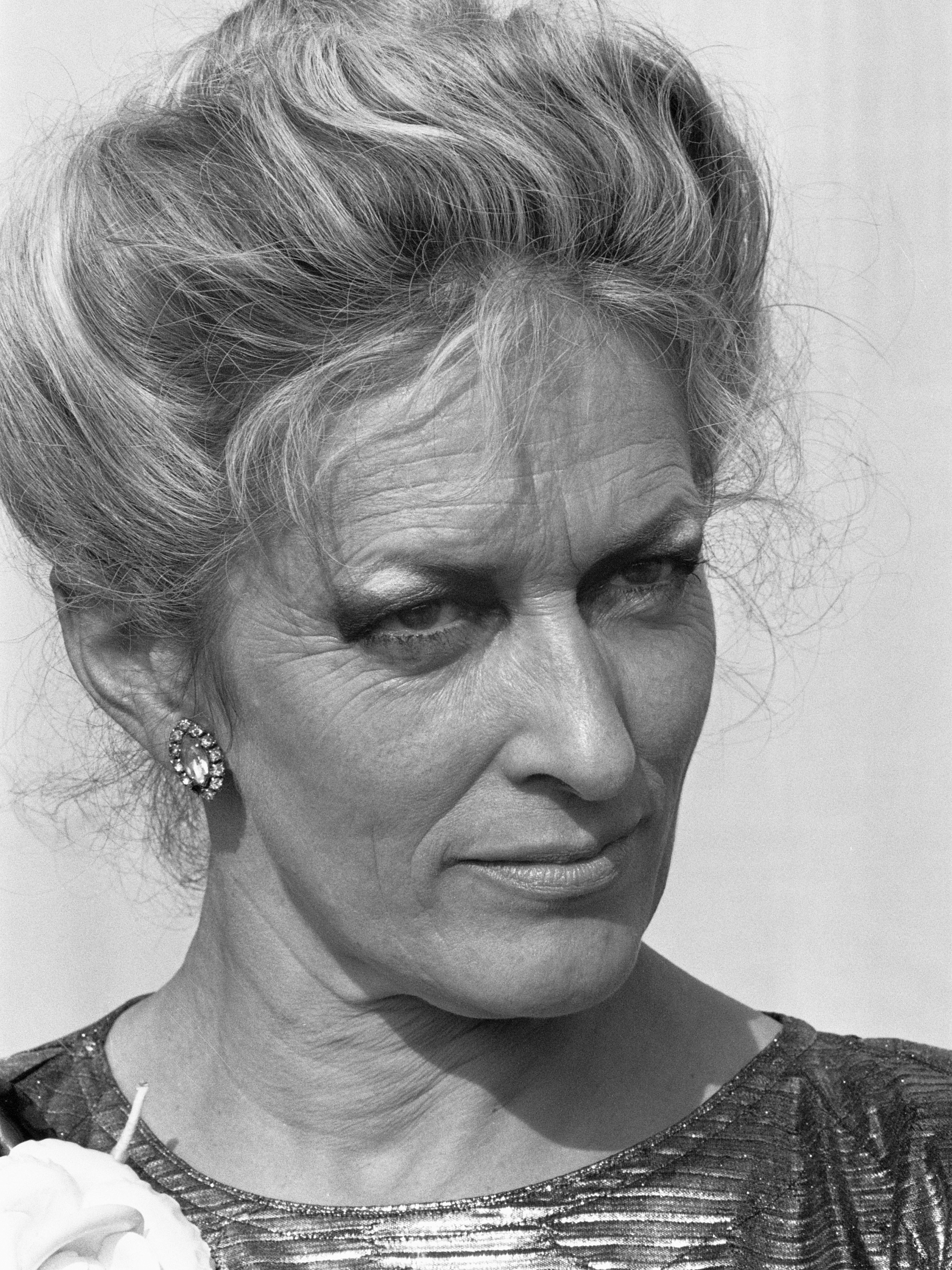
Marte Röling, 1989

Marte Röling (Born 16 December 1939) is a Dutch artist and actress.

== Life and work ==
Röling was born as the second child of Gé Röling and Martine Antonie (actually: Tonny Grolle). Her parents were both artists. From the age of sixteen, she studied drawing and painting at the Rijksakademie van visual arts in Amsterdam, where she was taught by her father, among others. From 1959, she exhibited in Europe and the United States. She is known for her large paintings and sculptures. In the 1960s, she was asked by Jeanne Roos, fashion editor at Het Parool, to make fashion drawings. According to her own words, she only learned to draw properly then.

In 1965 Röling won the Culture Prize of the municipality of Hilversum. Later she also made other works of art, such as the Flag Monument for the Academic Medical Center (1984) in Amsterdam, Writing hand (1975) in the top of the facade of the ING office in Leeuwarden, portraits of Queen Beatrix and Prince Claus in the years eighty and the statue Non scholae, sed vitae for the University of Groningen. Röling also designed record covers, stamps, theater sets, wall paintings, posters, costumes, reliefs, films, and painted a tram. Marte Röling works with glass, metal, stone, paint or plastic, among other things.

On 17 January 2010 Röling was appointed a Knight of the Order of the Netherlands Lion. In 2014, she received the Medal of Honor for Art and Science associated with the House Order of Orange from King Willem-Alexander.

== Personal life ==
Röling lived with Hans Koetsier when she met Henk Jurriaans in 1969. Röling went to live with Jurriaans and stayed with him until his death. Jurriaans also lived together with three other women: Adriënne Morriën, Alissa Morriën and Wanda Werner in a farm in Uithuizen, in the province of Groningen. Her mother also lived in the farm for twelve years. Röling is the cousin of artist Matthijs Röling and niece of the polemologist Bert Röling.
