= Noor Nuyten =

Dutch artist

Noor Nuyten (born 1986) is a Dutch artist who lives and works in Amsterdam and Brussels.

== Education ==
Nuyten followed a postgraduate program at HISK in Ghent (BE), and studied at Malmö Art Academy (SE) and Art Academy Minerva Groningen (NL). In 2015, she was a guest resident at the Rijksakademie van beeldende kunsten in Amsterdam (NL).

== Work ==
Nuyten is known for her diverse artistic practice and multimedia work, providing new ways to engage in a critical but humorous relationship with rationally structured systems. She took part in exhibitions and events at a.o. Staedtische Gallery Wolfsburg, Airspace Gallery Manchester, Kunsthalle Münster, museumnacht at Ons' Lieve Heer op Solder, PASS initiated by Jan Hoet Junior and Jan Hoet, Moscow International Biennale, Art International Istanbul, Gallery in Johannesburg, Unseen Amsterdam, Art Rotterdam, Upstream Gallery, The Institute She gives artist workshops at Stedelijk Museum Amsterdam.
