= Shani Peters =

American artist (born 1981)

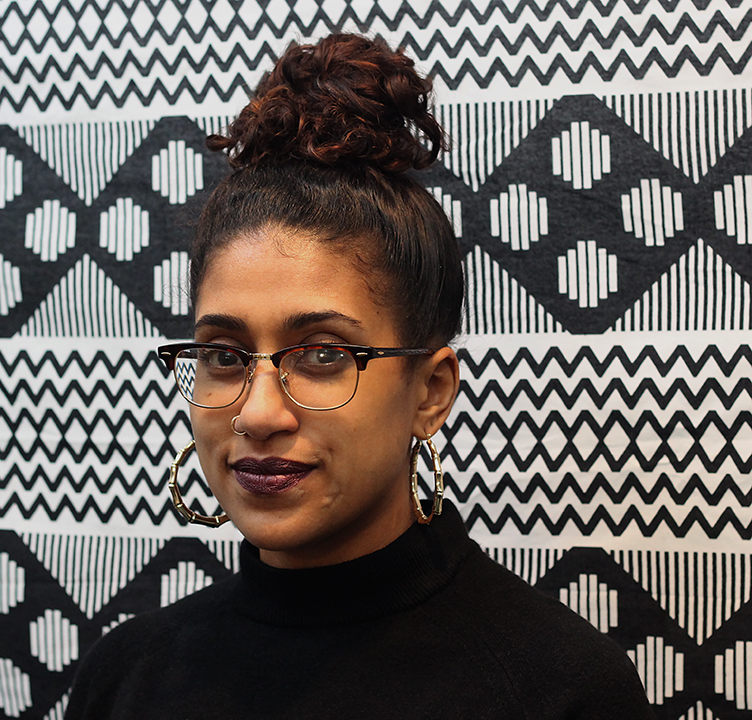
- Born: 1981 (age 44–45); Lansing, Michigan, U.S.
- Education: Michigan State University; City College of New York
- Occupation: Artist
- Website: www.shanipeters.com

Shani Peters (born 1981) is an artist from Lansing, Michigan, based in New York. She received her BA from Michigan State University and her MFA from the City College of New York, where she taught in 2020. Her work often addresses issues related to social justice in a range of media and processes including printmaking, interpretations of record-keeping, collaborative projects, video and collage. Shani Peters has presented work all throughout the US and abroad at the New Museum, NY; The Schomburg Center for Research in Black Culture, NY; Seoul Art Space Geumcheon, South Korea; The National Gallery of Zimbabwe; and Bauhaus-Building Dessau, Germany. In 2019, she was a Joan Mitchell Foundation artist-in-residence in New Orleans. In 2017, she exhibited at Columbia University's Wallach Gallery.

== Artistic inspiration ==
Peters' inspirations comes from various aspects of her life as she mentioned; "My art practice encompasses community building, activism histories, the subversion of popular media, and the creation of accessible imaginative experiences".

== Published writing ==
Peters has contributed to various publications over the years. In 2015, she wrote The Good, which was published in Notebook 4: U.S. Independent Art Spaces & Initiatives Directory by Threewalls. That same year, she authored Chameleon Street: A Reintroduction, which appeared in The Crown: Contemporary Construction of Self in America, a project associated with her exhibition at GalleryDAAS and published by The Regents of the University of Michigan in April 2015. More recently, in April 2023, Shani Peters wrote U.S.->U.K.->S.K. and Back: Observations on the Western World's Fat Clogging of Arteries and Sugar Coating of Truth, which was featured in Arts in a Changing America. Through her written work, alongside her artistic practice, Peters continues to explore themes of identity, social justice, and collective empowerment.

== Works ==
- 2011: "We Promote Love and Knowledge" (performance)
- 2008: "White Lies, Black Noise" (exhibit)
- 2010: "Battle for the Hearts and Minds" (film)
- 2013: "Steppin' Out: Half Hasn't been told" (photo-montage)
- 2016: "Peace and Restoration" (photo-montage)
- 2016: "The Crown" (traveling exhibit)
- "The Laundromat Project" (video)
- 2016: "Peace & Restoration for Self-Determination" (exhibit)

== Grants and awards ==
- 2009 Urban Artist Initiative/New York City Fellowship
- 2014 Foundation for Contemporary Arts, Emergency Grant
- 2015 Joan Mitchell Foundation Emerging Artist Grant Rema Hort Mann Foundation Artist Community Engagement Grant: "Tradução: Intercultural Media Exchange: US & Brazil", w/ Sharita Towne Alumni Award: The Laundromat Project The Rauschenberg Foundation, Artist As Activist Travel Grant: Zimbabwe & South Africa
- 2016 Precipice Fund: URe:AD Press, w/ Sharita Towne Rema Hort Mann Foundation Artist Community Engagement Grant: URe:AD Press, w/ Sharita Towne
- 2018 UMEZ Engagement, LMCC w/ The Black School Creative Learning, LMCC, w/ The Black School Creative Learning, LMCC, w/ The Black School
