= Diever =

- Village
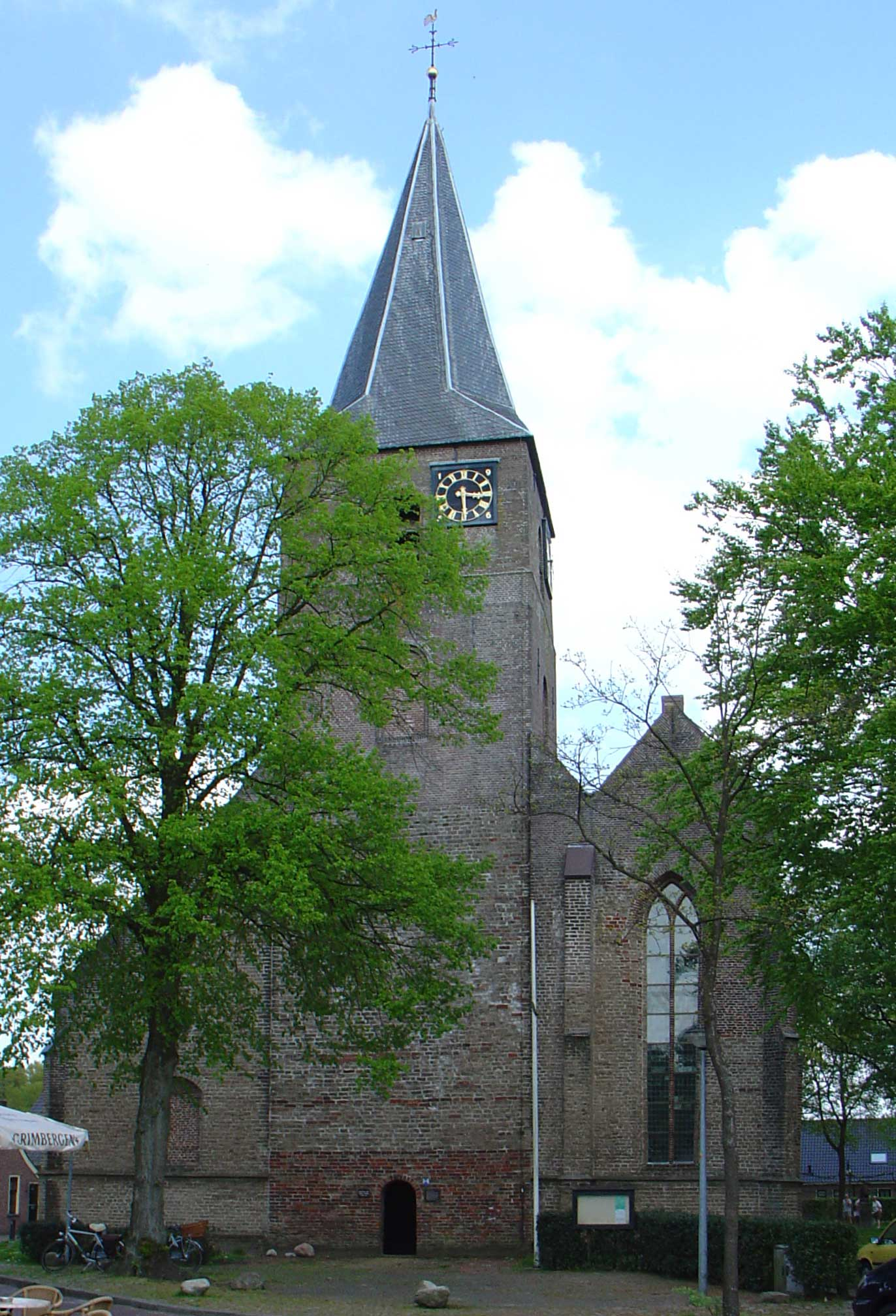
- Sint-Pancratiuskerk of Diever

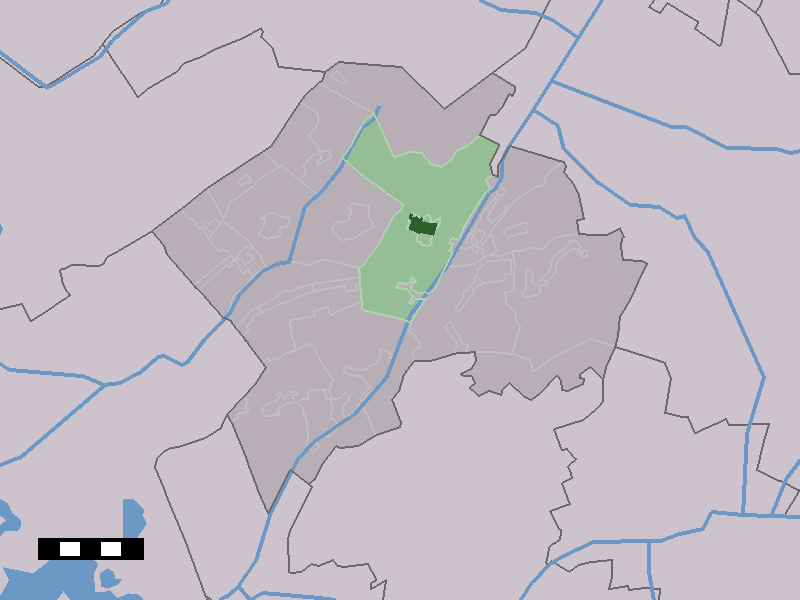
- The town centre (dark green) and the statistical district (light green) of Diever in the municipality of Westerveld.

- Location in the province of Drenthe Diever (Netherlands)
- Coordinates: 52°51′20″N 6°19′3″E
- Country: Netherlands
- Province: Drenthe
- Municipality: Westerveld

Area
  - Total: 36.73 km^{2} (14.18 sq mi)
- Elevation: 10 m (33 ft)

Population (2021)
  - Total: 2,715
  - Density: 73.92/km^{2} (191.4/sq mi)
- Time zone: UTC+1 (CET)
  - Summer (DST): UTC+2 (CEST)
- Postal code: 7981
- Dialing code: 0521

Diever is a village in the Dutch province of Drenthe. It is a part of the municipality of Westerveld, and lies about 18 km northwest of Hoogeveen.

Diever is located near the Drentse Hoofdvaart, a major north–south route for pleasure boats in the province of Drenthe. Diever is located next to the Drents-Friese Wold, one of the national parks in the Netherlands, and a attraction for tourists. In the centre of Diever there is the brink, the village square with old buildings surrounding it. The Dutch Reformed Saint Pancratius-church is a 15th-century building, and considered one of the most beautiful churches of Drenthe.

Diever was a separate municipality until 1998, when the new municipality of Westerveld was created.

== Shakespeare ==
In July and August the local people of Diever perform in dramas written by William Shakespeare. Diever is also known as "Shakespeare-town". The plays are being performed in an open-air theatre. The local amateur theater group was formed in 1946 by a local medical doctor, Mr. Derp Broekema. Thus, in 2006 the 60th anniversary of this annual event was celebrated with the performance of Henry IV.

== Gallery ==
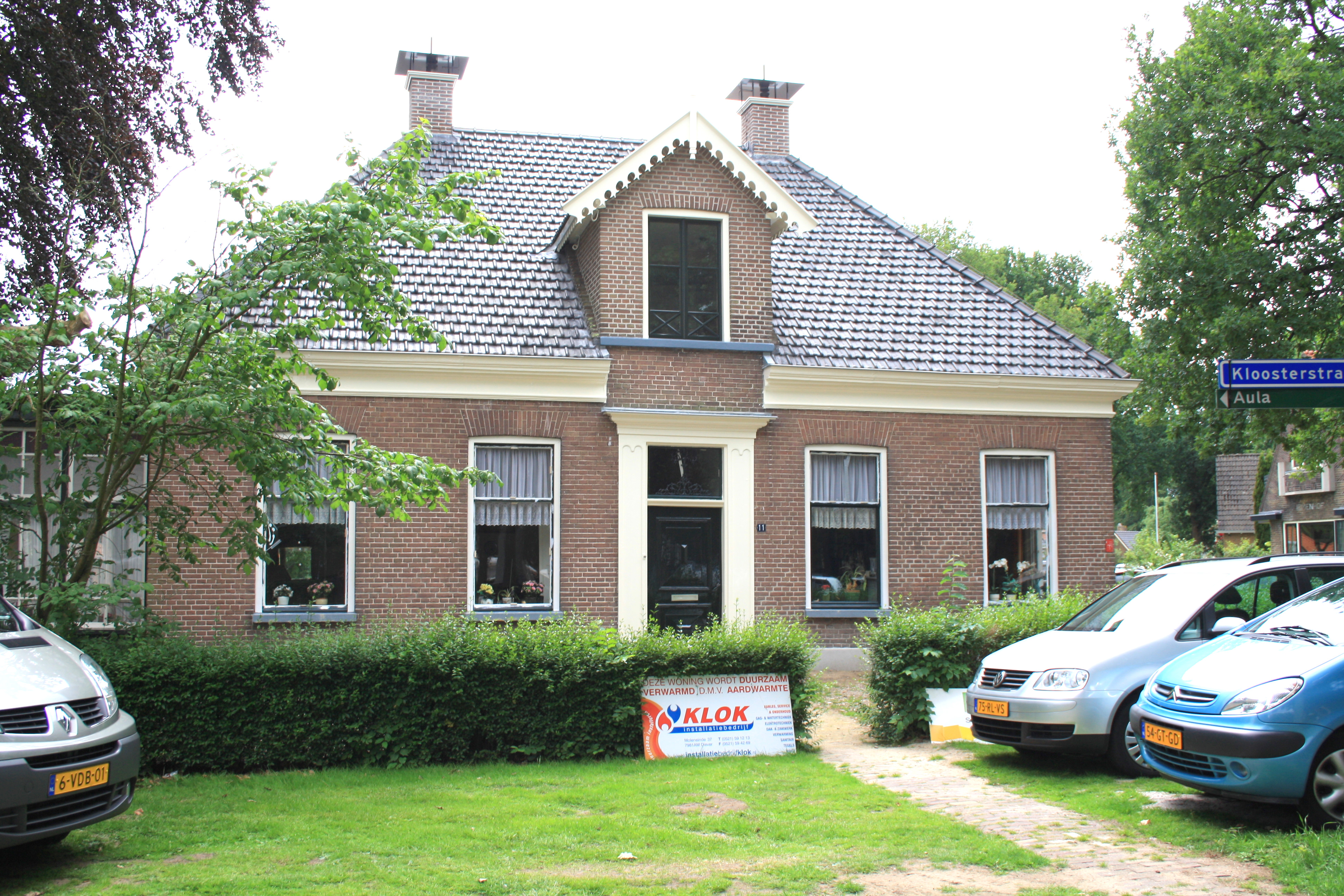
House in Diever

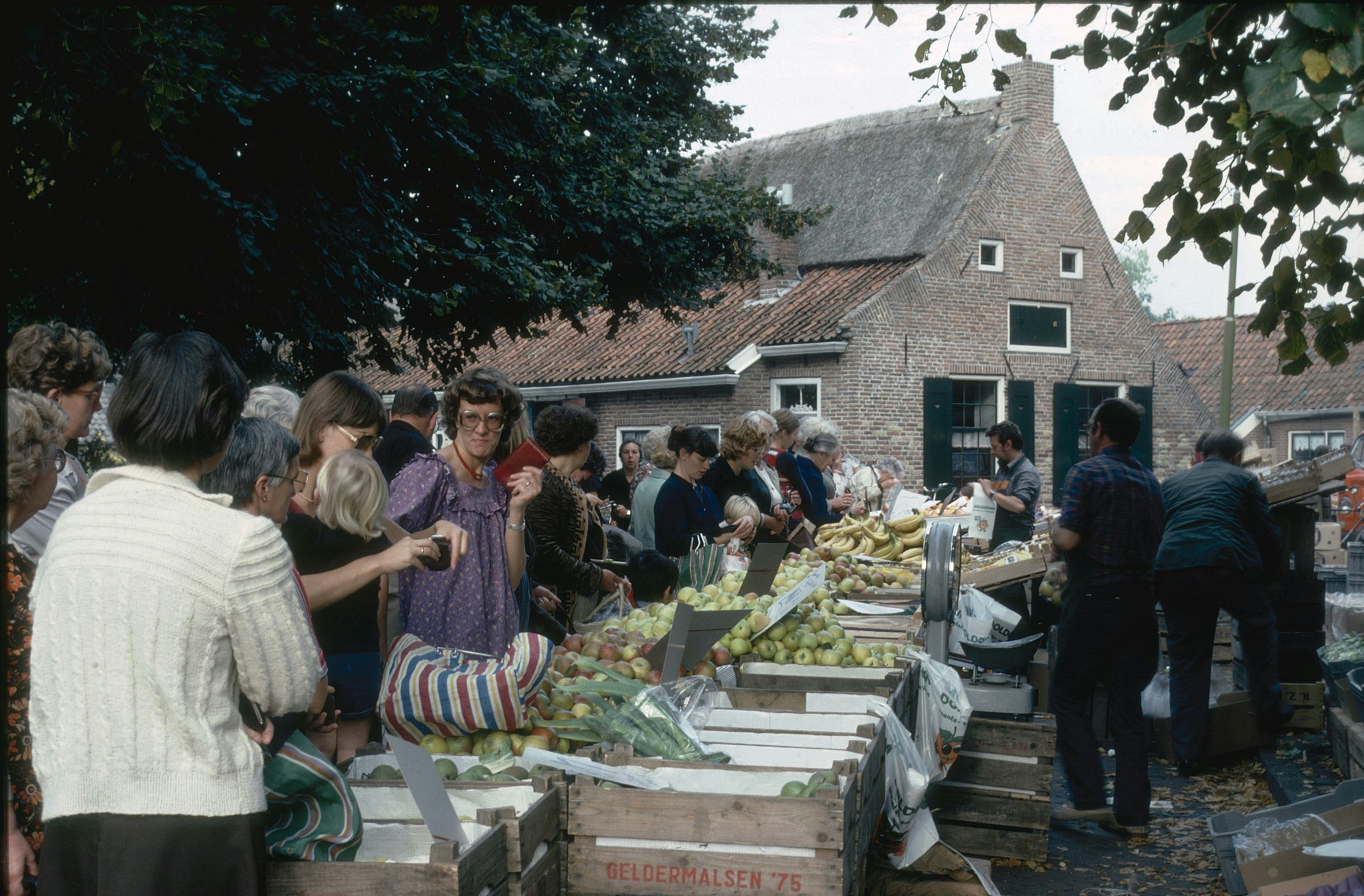
Market (1980)

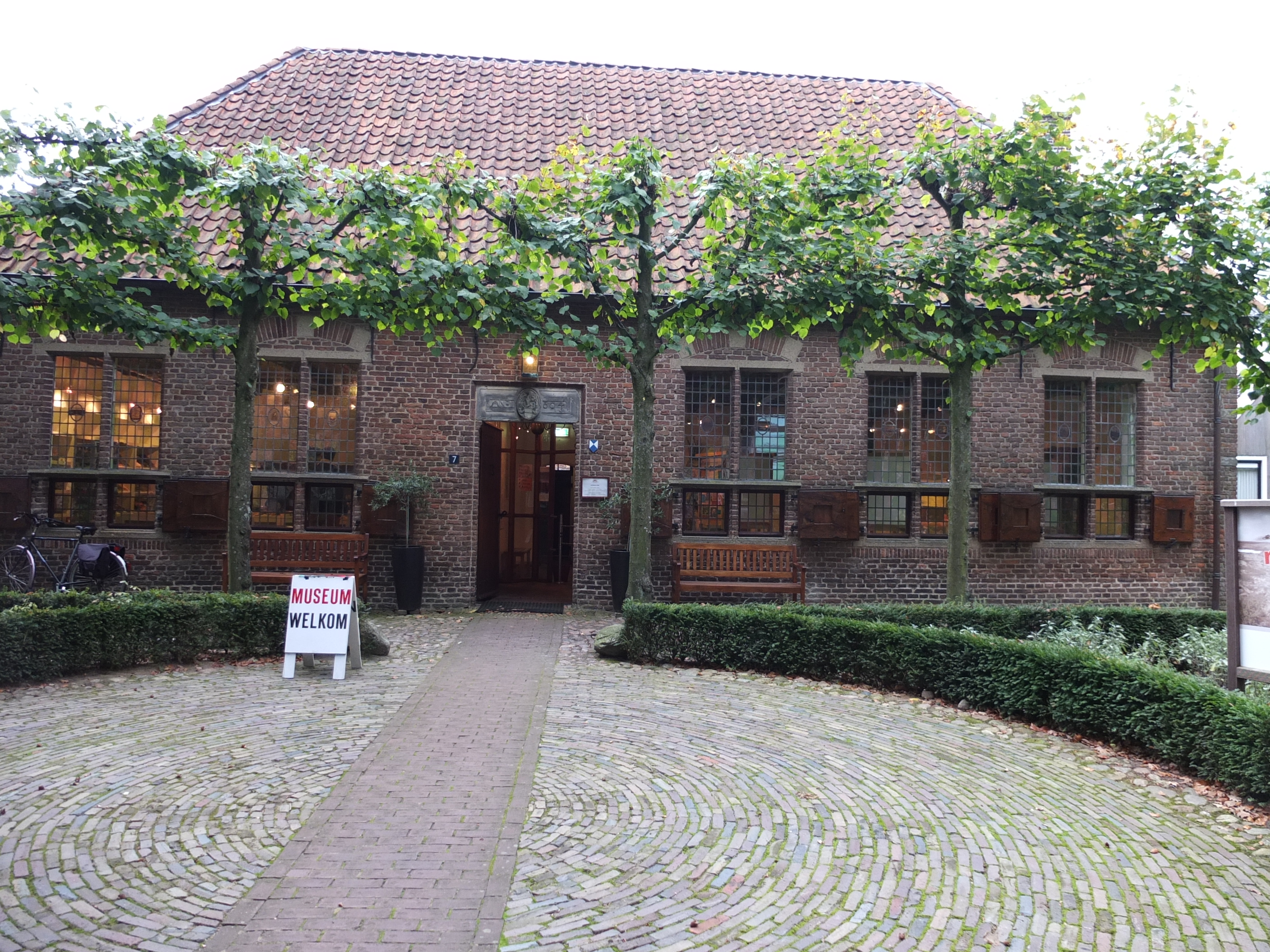
Archaeological museum

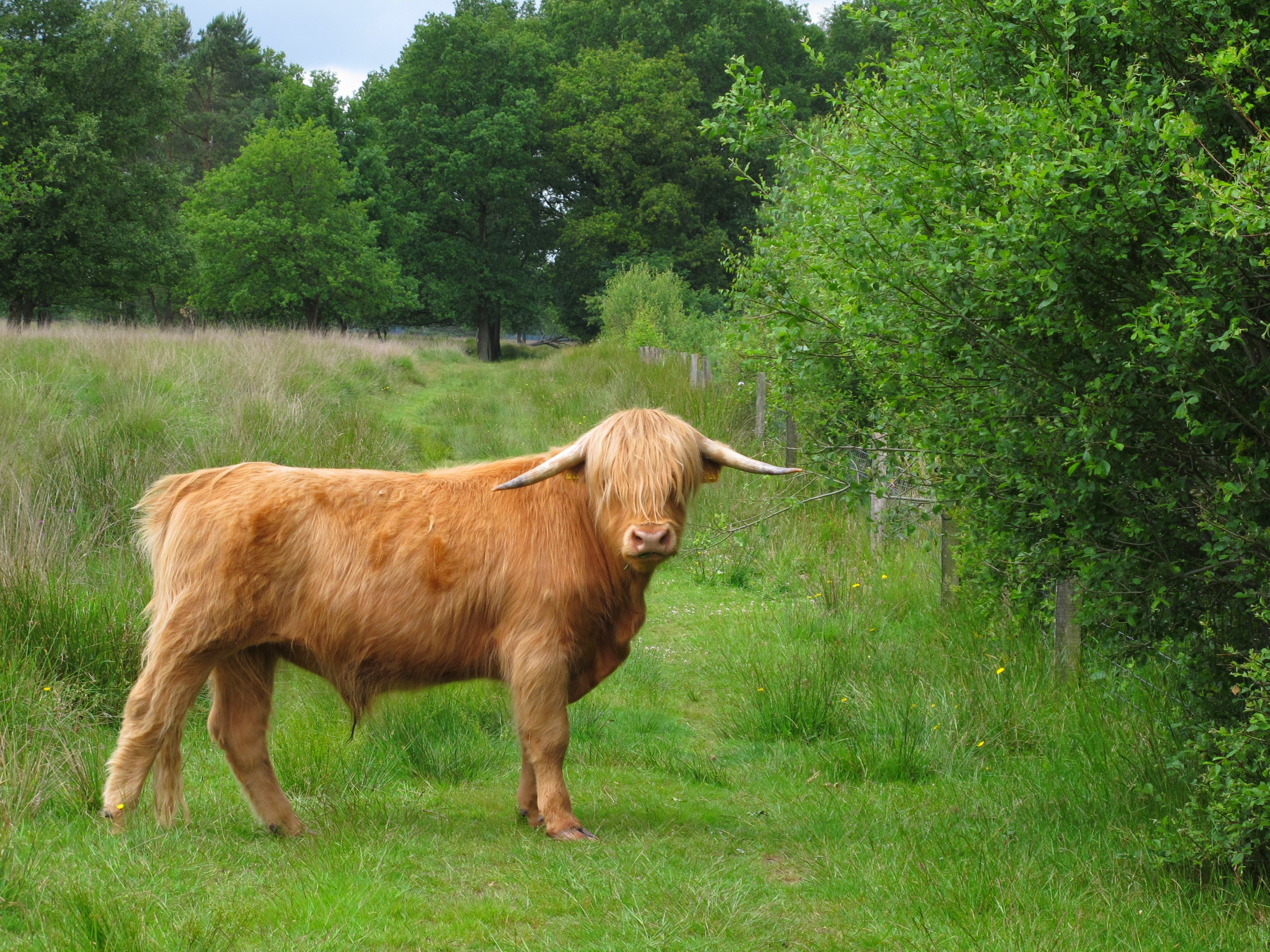
Bull in Diever
