= Martin Tissing =

Dutch artist (1936–2018)

- Born: March 14, 1936; Groningen, Netherlands
- Died: April 13, 2018 (aged 82)

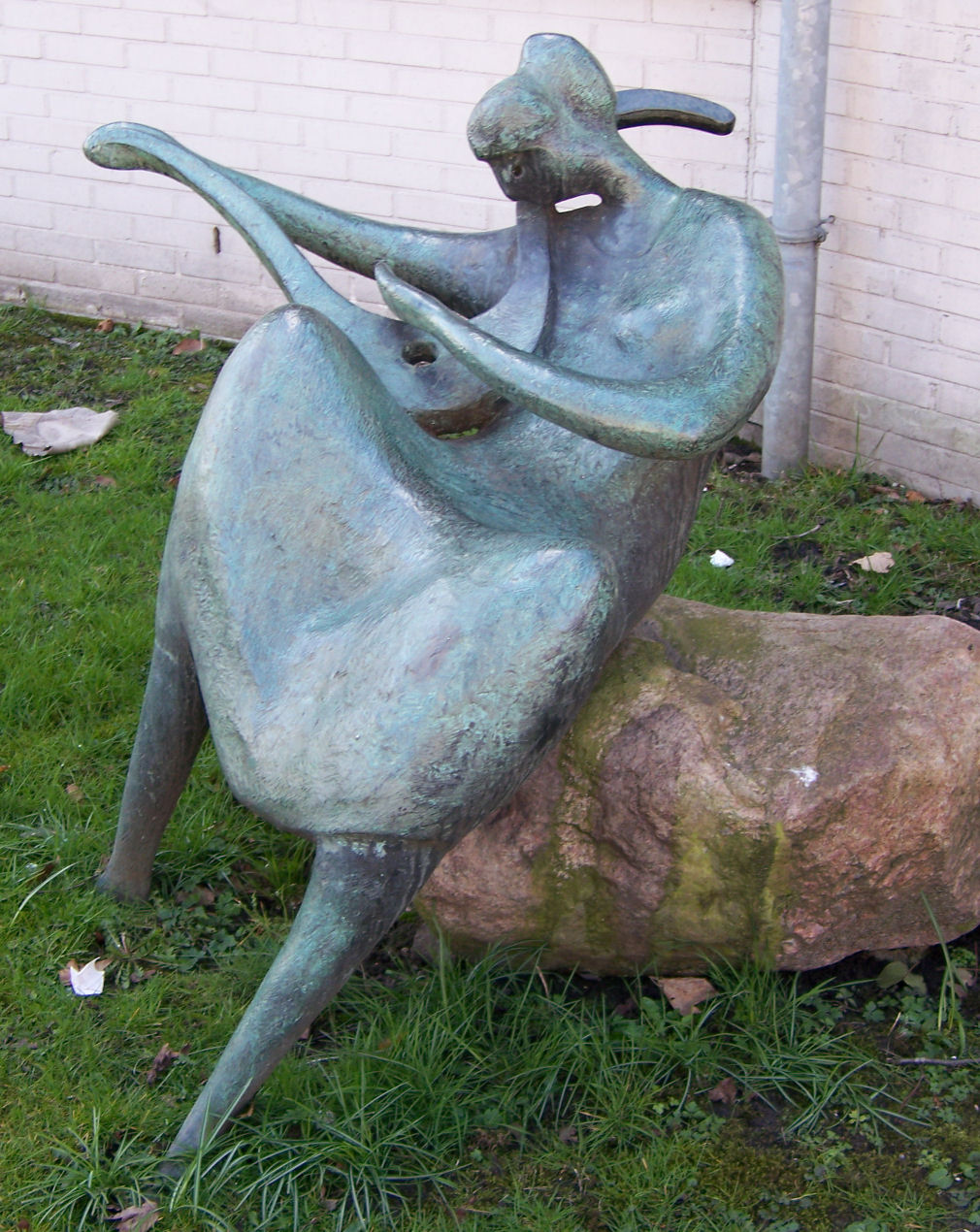
Luitspeelster (Lute player) created by Tissing (1963)

Martin Tissing (14 March, 1936 — 13 April, 2018) was a Dutch painter.

Tissing had been influenced by Mimmo Paladino and Nicola de Maria.

Between 1959 and 1966, he received three times an exchange scholarship from the Ministry of Education and Culture. As a result, he temporarily lived and worked in Marrakesh, Rome, and Poland. In the years that followed, he continued to travel extensively abroad for work.

Works by Tissing are held in the collection of the Groninger Museum and in museums abroad.
